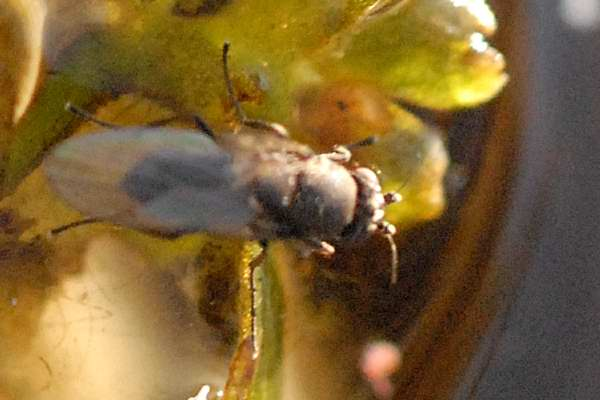
- Pseudocollinella humida

Scientific classification
- Kingdom: Animalia
- Phylum: Arthropoda
- Class: Insecta
- Order: Diptera
- Family: Sphaeroceridae
- Subfamily: Limosininae
- Genus: Pseudocollinella; Duda, 1924

Type species
- Limosina septentrionalis Stenhammar, 1855

Synonyms
- Spinotarsella Richards, 1929; Opacifrons Duda, 1918; Archicollinella Duda, 1925

= Pseudocollinella =

Genus of flies

Pseudocollinella is a genus of flies belonging to the family Sphaeroceridae.

== Species ==
- P. abhorrens (Roháček, 1990)
- P. aquilifrons Marshall in Marshall & Smith, 1993
- P. arctopellucida Marshall in Marshall & Smith, 1993
- P. attractans Marshall in Marshall & Smith, 1993
- P. boreosciaspidis Marshall in Marshall & Smith, 1993
- P. caelobata (Spuler, 1924)
- P. charlottensis Marshall in Marshall & Smith, 1993
- P. difficilis (Richards, 1973)
- P. flavilabris (Hackman, 1968)
- P. grandis (Spuler, 1924)
- P. hirsutipellucida Marshall in Marshall & Smith, 1993
- P. humida (Haliday, 1836)
- P. jorlii (Carles-Tolrá, 1990)
- P. nasalis (Richards, 1973)
- P. ochrea (Papp, 1974)
- P. parapellucida Marshall in Marshall & Smith, 1993
- P. parasciaspidis Marshall in Marshall & Smith, 1993
- P. pellucida (Spuler, 1924)
- P. sciaspidis (Spuler, 1924)
- P. septentrionalis (Stenhammar, 1855)
- P. tunisica (Papp, 1977)
- P. utapellucida Marshall in Marshall & Smith, 1993
