= Copromyzinae =

Scientific classification
- Kingdom: Animalia
- Phylum: Arthropoda
- Class: Insecta
- Order: Diptera
- Family: Sphaeroceridae
- Subfamily: Copromyzinae; Stenhammar, 1855

Type genus
- Copromyza Fallén, 1810

Subfamily of flies

Copromyzinae is a subfamily of flies belonging to the family Sphaeroceridae.

== Genera ==
- Achaetothorax Hedicke, 1923
- Alloborborus Duda, 1923
- Antrops Enderlein, 1909
- Archiborborus Duda, 1921
- Borborillus Duda, 1923
- Copromyza Fallén, 1810
- Crumomyia Macquart, 1835
- Dudaia Hedicke, 1923
- Frutillaria Richards, 1961
- Gymnometopina Hedicke, 1923
- Lotophila Lioy, 1864
- Immoderatus Papp, 2004
- Metaborborus Vanschuytbroeck, 1948
- Norrbomia Papp, 1988
- Palaeoceroptera Duda, 1929
- Palaeolimosina Duda, 1920
- Penola Richards, 1941
- Pycnopota Bezzi, 1927
- Richardsia Papp, 1973
