= Opacifrons =

Scientific classification
- Kingdom: Animalia
- Phylum: Arthropoda
- Clade: Pancrustacea
- Class: Insecta
- Order: Diptera
- Family: Sphaeroceridae
- Subfamily: Limosininae
- Genus: Opacifrons; Duda, 1918

Type species
- Limosina coxata Stenhammar, 1855

Synonyms
- Bispinicercia (Su & Liu, 2009)

Genus of flies

Opacifrons is a genus of flies belonging to the family Sphaeroceridae.

== Species ==
- O. aequalis (Grimshaw, 1901)
- O. bisecta (Malloch, 1914)
- O. brevisecunda Papp, 1991
- O. brevistylus Marshall & Langstaff, 1998
- O. convexa (Spuler, 1924)
- O. coxata (Stenhammar, 1855)
- O. cubita Marshall & Langstaff, 1998
- O. differentialis Su, Liu & Xu, 2013
- O. digna (Roháček, 1982)
- O. distorta Marshall & Langstaff, 1998
- O. dupliciseta (Duda, 1925)
- O. elbergi (Papp, 1979)
- O. ghesquierei Vanschuytbroeck, 1951
- O. inornata Marshall & Langstaff, 1998
- O. liupanensis (Su & Liu, 2009)
- O. maculifrons (Becker, 1907)
- O. mirabilis (Papp, 1973)
- O. moravica (Roháček, 1975)
- O. niveohalterata (Duda, 1925)
- O. obunca Marshall & Langstaff, 1998
- O. orbicularis (Becker, 1920)
- O. parabisecta Marshall & Langstaff, 1998
- O. pavicula Marshall & Langstaff, 1998
- O. prominentia Su, Liu & Xu, 2013
- O. pseudimpudica (Deeming, 1969)
- O. quadrispinosa Marshall & Langstaff, 1998
- O. quarta Marshall & Langstaff, 1998
- O. redunca Marshall & Langstaff, 1998
- O. rubrifrons (Vanschuytbroeck, 1950)
- O. simplisterna Marshall & Langstaff, 1998
- O. spatulata Marshall & Langstaff, 1998
- O. triloba Marshall & Langstaff, 1998
