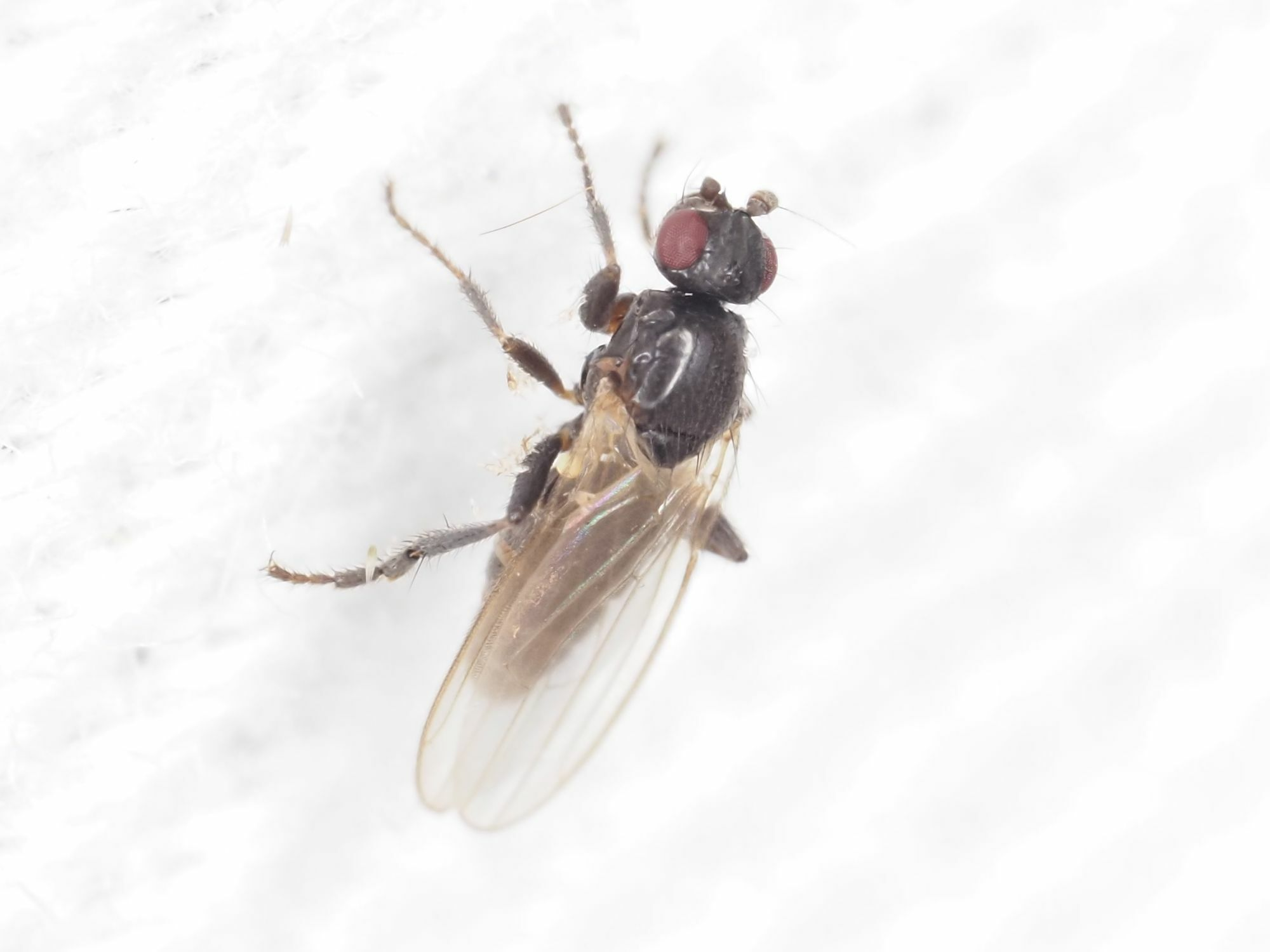
- Norrbomia, Austria

Scientific classification
- Kingdom: Animalia
- Phylum: Arthropoda
- Clade: Pancrustacea
- Class: Insecta
- Order: Diptera
- Family: Sphaeroceridae
- Subfamily: Copromyzinae
- Genus: Norrbomia; Papp, 1988

Type species
- Norrbomia indica Papp, 1988

Synonyms
- Borborillus Duda, 1923

= Norrbomia =

Genus of flies

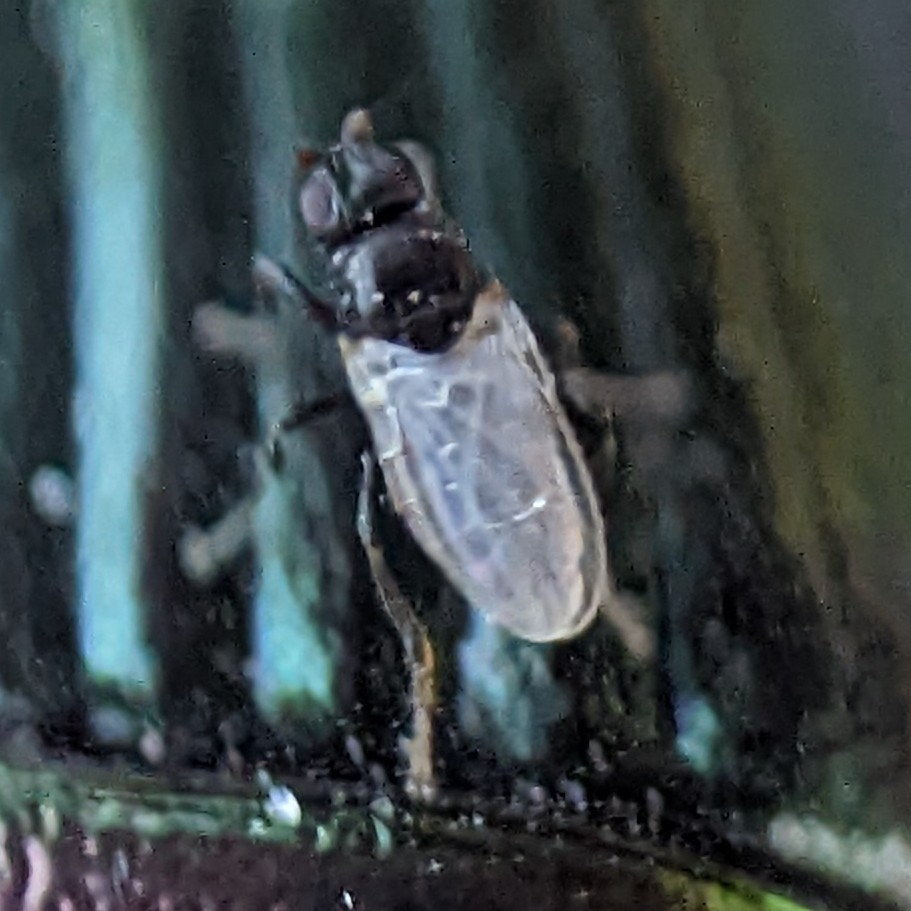
Norrbomia frigipennis, Florida

Norrbomia is a genus of flies belonging to the family Sphaeroceridae.

== Species ==
- N. beckeri (Duda, 1938)
- N. costalis (Zetterstedt, 1847)
- N. cryptica (Papp, 1973)
- N. demeteri Papp, 1988
- N. elephantis Papp, 1988
- N. frigipennis (Spuler, 1925)
- N. fulvipennis Marshall & Norrbom, 1992
- N. fumipennis (Stenhammar, 1855)
- N. fuscana (Becker, 1909)
- N. gravis (Adams, 1905)
- N. hispanica (Duda, 1923)
- N. hypopygialis (Richards, 1939)
- N. indica Papp, 1988
- N. keniaca Papp, 1988
- N. lacteipennis (Malloch, 1913)
- N. marginatis (Adams, 1905)
- N. mexicana Marshall & Norrbom, 1992
- N. micropyga (Papp, 1973)
- N. mpazaensis (Vanschuytbroeck, 1959)
- N. nepalensis Papp, 2003
- N. nilotica (Becker, 1903)
- N. nitidifrons (Duda, 1923)
- N. niveipennis (Duda, 1923)
- N. sarcophaga Papp, 1988
- N. scripta (Malloch, 1915)
- N. singusta Marshall & Norrbom, 1992
- N. somogyii (Papp, 1973)
- N. sordida (Zetterstedt, 1847)
- N. stuckenbergi (Hackman, 1967)
- N. szelenyii (Papp, 1974)
- N. triglabra Marshall & Norrbom, 1992
- N. tropica (Duda, 1923)
- N. unicolor (Becker, 1908)
- N. utukuruensis (Vanschuytbroeck, 1959)
- N. yukonensis Marshall & Norrbom, 1992
