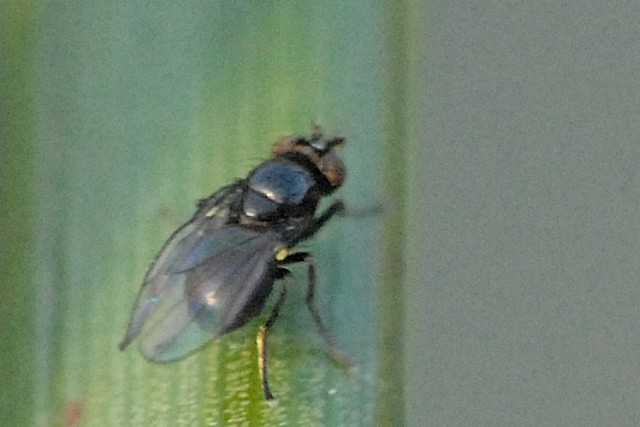
- Rachispoda limosa

Scientific classification
- Kingdom: Animalia
- Phylum: Arthropoda
- Clade: Pancrustacea
- Class: Insecta
- Order: Diptera
- Family: Sphaeroceridae
- Subfamily: Limosininae
- Genus: Rachispoda; Lioy, 1864

Type species
- Copromyza limosa Fallén, 1820

Synonyms
- Collinella Duda, 1918; Colinella Duda, 1918; Collinellula Strand, 1928; Colluta Strand, 1932; Rachispodina Enderlein, 1936

= Rachispoda =

Genus of flies

Rachispoda is a genus of flies belonging to the family Sphaeroceridae.

== Species ==
- R. acrosticalis (Becker, 1903)
- R. aeditua Wheeler in Wheeler & Marshall, 1995
- R. aemula (Roháček, 1993)
- R. aequipilosa (Duda, 1925)
- R. afghanica (Papp, 1978)
- R. afra (Roháček, 1991)
- R. alces Wheeler in Wheeler & Marshall, 1995
- R. amarilla Wheeler in Wheeler & Marshall, 1995
- R. anathema Wheeler, 1995
- R. anceps (Stenhammar, 1855)
- R. andina Wheeler in Wheeler & Marshall, 1995
- R. ariana (Papp, 1978)
- R. arnaudi Wheeler, 1995
- R. aroana (Richards, 1973)
- R. atra (Adams, 1903)
- R. atrolimosa (Frey, 1945)
- R. australica (Duda, 1925)
- R. awalensis (Richards, 1973)
- R. baezensis Wheeler in Wheeler & Marshall, 1995
- R. barbata (Sabrosky, 1949)
- R. bipilosa (Duda, 1925)
- R. boninensis (Richards, 1963)
- R. breviceps (Stenhammar, 1855)
- R. brevior (Roháček, 1983)
- R. breviseta (Malloch, 1914)
- R. caesia Wheeler in Wheeler & Marshall, 1995
- R. canadensis Wheeler, 1995
- R. caudatula (Roháček, 1991)
- R. cesta Wheeler in Wheeler & Marshall, 1995
- R. chisholmae Wheeler in Wheeler and Marshall, 1995
- R. cilifera (Rondani, 1880)
- R. clivicola Wheeler in Wheeler & Marshall, 1995
- R. colombiana Wheeler in Wheeler & Marshall, 1995
- R. condyla Wheeler in Wheeler & Marshall, 1995
- R. congoensis (Vanschuytbroeck, 1950)
- R. conradti (Duda, 1925)
- R. cryptica (Sabrosky, 1949)
- R. cryptistyla Wheeler, 1995
- R. cryptochaeta (Duda, 1918)
- R. decimsetosa (Richards, 1931)
- R. digitata Wheeler, 1995
- R. disciseta (Richards, 1963)
- R. divergens (Duda, 1925)
- R. dolorosa (Williston, 1896)
- R. duodecimseta (Papp, 1973)
- R. duplex (Roháček, 1991)
- R. eurystyla Wheeler, 1995
- R. excavata (Papp, 1979)
- R. falcicula Wheeler, 1995
- R. filiforceps (Duda, 1925)
- R. forceps (Sabrosky, 1949)
- R. forficula Wheeler in Wheeler & Marshall, 1995
- R. freyi (Hackman, 1958)
- R. frosti (C. W. Johnson, 1915)
- R. fumipennis (Spuler, 1924)
- R. fuscinervis (Malloch, 1912)
- R. fuscipennis (Haliday, 1833)
- R. gel (Papp, 1978)
- R. geneiates Wheeler in Wheeler & Marshall, 1995
- R. gobiensis (Papp, 1974)
- R. hammersteini (Duda, 1925)
- R. hoplites (Spuler, 1924)
- R. hostica (Villeneuve, 1917)
- R. iberica (Roháček, 1991)
- R. intermedia (Duda, 1918)
- R. intonsa Wheeler in Wheeler & Marshall, 1995
- R. joycei Wheeler in Wheeler & Marshall, 1995
- R. justini Wheeler in Wheeler & Marshall, 1995
- R. kabuli (Papp, 1978)
- R. kaieteurana Wheeler in Wheeler & Marshall, 1995
- R. kuntzei (Duda, 1918)
- R. lacustrina Wheeler, 1995
- R. latiforceps (Sabrosky, 1949)
- R. laureata Wheeler in Wheeler & Marshall, 1995
- R. limosa (Fallén, 1820)
- R. longior (Roháček, 1991)
- R. lucaris Wheeler in Wheeler & Marshall, 1995
- R. lugubrina (Zetterstedt, 1847)
- R. luisi Wheeler in Wheeler & Marshall, 1995
- R. luminosa Wheeler in Wheeler & Marshall, 1995
- R. lutosa (Stenhammar, 1855)
- R. lutosoidea (Duda, 1938)
- R. m-nigrum (Malloch, 1912)
- R. macalpinei (Richards, 1973)
- R. maculinea (Richards, 1966)
- R. marginalis (Malloch, 1914)
- R. meges (Papp, 1978)
- R. melanderi (Sabrosky, 1949)
- R. merga Wheeler in Wheeler & Marshall, 1995
- R. meringoterga Wheeler in Wheeler & Marshall, 1995
- R. mexicana Wheeler, 1995
- R. michigana (Sabrosky, 1949)
- R. microarista (Papp, 1973)
- R. multisetosa (Duda, 1925)
- R. mycophora (Munari, 1995)
- R. nebulosa (de Meijere, 1916)
- R. obfuscata (Tucker, 1907)
- R. ochrocephala (Munari, 1989)
- R. octisetosa (Becker, 1903)
- R. omega (Sabrosky, 1949)
- R. opinata (Roháček, 1991)
- R. oreadis Wheeler in Wheeler & Marshall, 1995
- R. paludicola Wheeler in Wheeler & Marshall, 1995
- R. papuana (Richards, 1973)
- R. paralutosa (Papp, 1973)
- R. pectinata Wheeler, 1995
- R. pereger Wheeler, 1995
- R. persica (Roháček, 1993)
- R. pluriseta (Duda, 1925)
- R. praealta Wheeler in Wheeler & Marshall, 1995
- R. praealta Wheeler in Wheeler & Marshall, 1995
- R. praeapicalis (Papp, 1979)
- R. promissa (Duda, 1925)
- R. pseudocilifera (Papp, 1974)
- R. pseudohostica (Duda, 1924)
- R. pseudooctisetosa (Duda, 1925)
- R. quadrilineata (de Meijere, 1918)
- R. quadriseta (Duda, 1938)
- R. recavisterna Wheeler in Wheeler & Marshall, 1995
- R. rhizophora Wheeler, 1995
- R. richardsi (Sabrosky, 1949)
- R. rutshuruensis (Vanschuytbroeck, 1950)
- R. sajanica (Papp, 1979)
- R. sauteri (Duda, 1925)
- R. schildi (Spuler, 1924)
- R. scotti (Richards, 1939)
- R. segem (Roháček, 1991)
- R. spatulata Wheeler, 1995
- R. spinicaudata (Papp, 1973)
- R. spinisterna (Papp, 1974)
- R. spuleri (Sabrosky, 1949)
- R. striata (Duda, 1925)
- R. suberecta (Sabrosky, 1949)
- R. subpiligera (Malloch, 1914)
- R. subsolana Wheeler, 1995
- R. subtinctipennis (Brunetti, 1913)
- R. subulata Wheeler, 1995
- R. synoria Wheeler in Wheeler & Marshall, 1995
- R. tenaculata (Sabrosky, 1949)
- R. territorialis (Richards, 1973)
- R. thaliathrix Wheeler in Wheeler & Marshall, 1995
- R. thermastris Wheeler in Wheeler & Marshall, 1995
- R. trichopyga Wheeler in Wheeler & Marshall, 1995
- R. trifascigera (Malloch, 1928)
- R. trigonata (Spuler, 1924)
- R. trochanterata (Malloch, 1913)
- R. tuberosa (Duda, 1938)
- R. unca (Roháček, 1993)
- R. uniseta (Roháček, 1991)
- R. urodela (Sabrosky, 1949)
- R. varicornis (Strobl, 1900)
- R. velutina (Séguy, 1933)
- R. villosa Wheeler in Wheeler & Marshall, 1995
- R. zygolepis Wheeler in Wheler & Marshall, 1995
