= Aptilotella =

Scientific classification
- Kingdom: Animalia
- Phylum: Arthropoda
- Class: Insecta
- Order: Diptera
- Family: Sphaeroceridae
- Subfamily: Limosininae
- Genus: Aptilotella; Duda, 1924

Type species
- Aptilotella borgmeieri Duda, 1924

Genus of flies

Aptilotella is a genus of flies belonging to the family Sphaeroceridae.

== Species ==
- A. borgmeieri Duda, 1924
