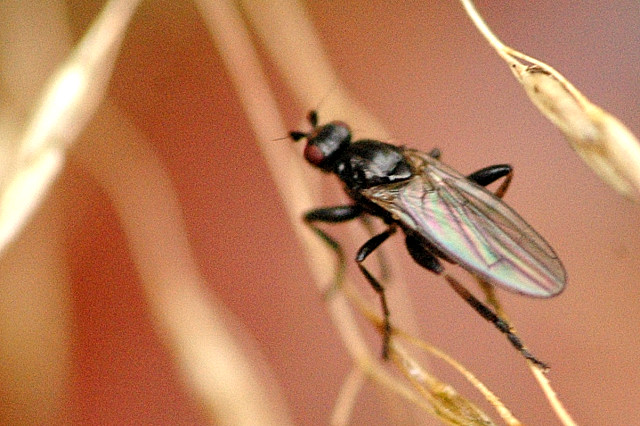
- Copromyza equina (Copromyzinae)

Scientific classification
- Kingdom: Animalia
- Phylum: Arthropoda
- Clade: Pancrustacea
- Class: Insecta
- Order: Diptera
- Superfamily: Sphaeroceroidea
- Family: Sphaeroceridae; Macquart, 1835

Subfamilies
- Copromyzinae; Homalomitrinae; Limosininae; Sphaerocerinae; Tucminae

Synonyms
- List: Borboridae Newman, 1834 (suppressed); Borborites Newman, 1834 (suppressed); Copromyzidae Stenhammar, 1855; Cypselidae Hendel, 1910 ([suppressed); Sphoeroceridae Macquart, 1846 (lapsus)

= Sphaeroceridae =

Family of insects

Sphaeroceridae are a family of true flies in the order Diptera, often called small dung flies, lesser dung flies or lesser corpse flies due to their saprophagous habits. They belong to the typical fly suborder Brachycera as can be seen by their short antennae, and more precisely they are members of the section Schizophora. There are over 1,300 species and about 125 genera accepted as valid today, but new taxa are still being described.

Unlike the large "corpse flies" or blow-flies of the family Calliphoridae and the large dung flies of the family Scathophagidae, the small dung flies are members of the schizophoran subsection Acalyptratae. Among their superfamily Sphaeroceroidea, they seem to be particularly close relatives of the family Heleomyzidae.

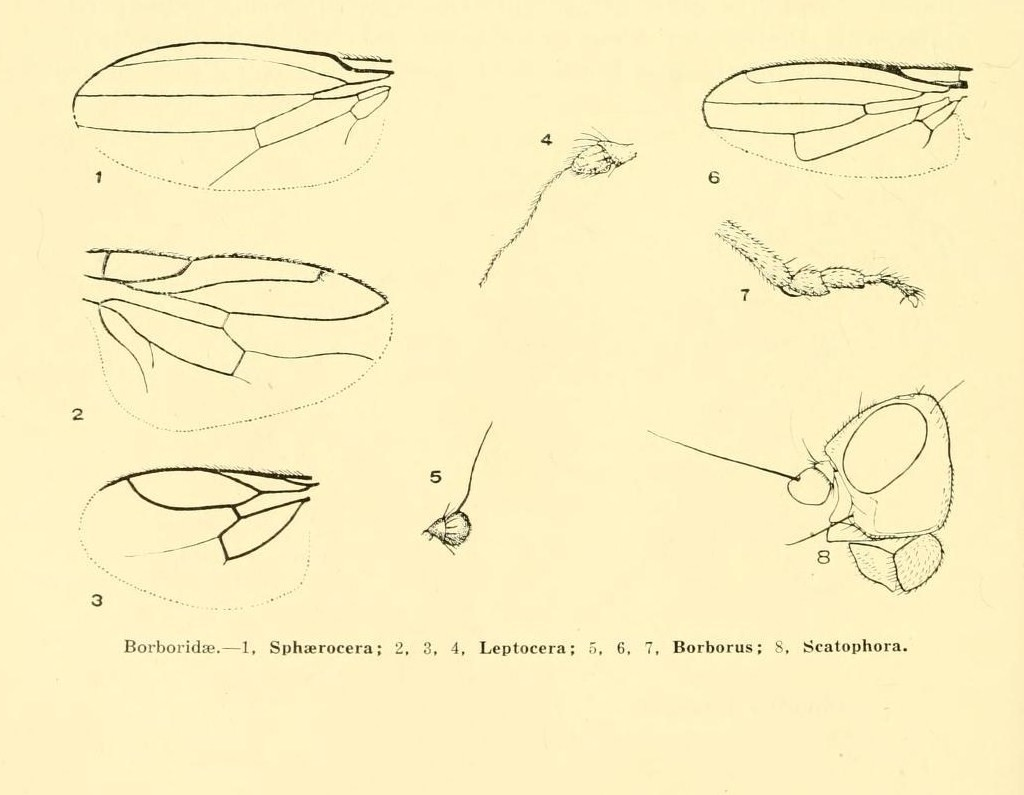
Sphaeroceridae morphological details

== Description and ecology ==
Housefly (left) vs. small dung fly (right)

Dung flies are small to minute, usually dull-colored flies with characteristically thickened first tarsomere of the posterior leg. The first tarsal segment is less than 1 1/2 times as long as the second tarsal segment and dilated. The crossvein separating the second basal and discal cells is missing. Veins four and five often fade apically. They occur all over the world except in regions with permanent ice-cover. Despite their ubiquity and abundance, little is known about their economic or ecological impact. Some species are known to be parthenogenetic.

Larval stages are poorly known, but those described are slender, narrowed anteriorly, with groups of ventral spicules on creeping welts. The larva is amphipneustic (having only the anterior and posterior pairs of spiracles). The mandibles are simple, hooked, and without additional teeth. The parastomal bars are long, thin structures, fused to the tentoropharyngeal sclerite. The hypopharyngeal sclerites are long separate or connected by a sclerotized bridge; the anterior spiracle (prothoracic spiracle) is a rosette or branched. The posterior spiracles (on the anal segment) are usually on two cylindrical lobes. Each spiracle has three slit or oval openings and three or five groups of interspiracular hairs that are branched in some species.

The larvae are microbial grazers found in abundance in many microenvironments with decomposing organic material. Most species appear to be associated with decaying plants or fungi and they are a part of the nutrient cycle. Some species, especially cave species, are polysaprophagous. Many species are associated with various kinds of faeces including human faeces; there are a few carrion-feeding species. These, however, are extremely abundant and are important components of the carrion-insect community. Sphaerocerids that abound in economically important decomposer communities such as compost and manure, and some decay cycles such as the wrack (seaweed) cycle are mediated by sphaerocerid-dominated insect communities.

As their microbe-associated habits suggest, sphaerocerids may carry many pathogenic microorganisms. Although their reclusive habits preclude a major role in disease transmission; some can present a public health hazard on occasion or act as a warning of one. For instance Leptocera caenosa and other sphaerocerids are associated with blocked sewage drains. Some species occasionally reach high population levels in food-processing plants and other buildings where they may indicate blocked drains, waste accumulation and inadequate hygiene. One species, Poecilosomella angulata, has been implicated in human intestinal myiasis They have been implicated as the major means by which nematodes are disseminated among mushroom houses. Sphaeoceridae often coexist with muscoids especially Fannia canicularis and Musca domestica in the complex manure ecosystem of poultry houses, and other confined-animal facilities. Here the sphaeocerids are prey for mites and beetles, which themselves also feed on the immatures of muscoid flies reducing the population of the more problematic muscoids. Carrion-feeding species are useful post mortem interval indicators in forensic entomology.

== Genera ==
The genera are arranged alphabetically according to subfamily; these are arranged in the presumed phylogenetic sequence from the most ancestral to the most advanced:

Subfamily Tucminae Marshall, 1996

- Tucma Mourgués-Schurter, 1987

Subfamily Copromyzinae Stenhammar, 1855

- Achaetothorax Hedicke, 1923
- Alloborborus Duda, 1923
- Antrops Enderlein, 1909
- Archiborborus Duda, 1921
- Borborillus Duda, 1923
- Copromyza Fallén, 1810
- Crumomyia Macquart, 1835
- Dudaia Hedicke, 1923
- Frutillaria Richards, 1961
- Gymnometopina Hedicke, 1923
- Lotophila Lioy, 1864
- Immoderatus Papp, 2004
- Metaborborus Vanschuytbroeck, 1948
- Norrbomia Papp, 1988
- Palaeoceroptera Duda, 1929
- Palaeolimosina Duda, 1920
- Penola Richards, 1941
- Pycnopota Bezzi, 1927
- Richardsia Papp, 1973

Subfamily Sphaerocerinae Macquart, 1835

Sphaerocera cf. curvipes of the Sphaerocerinae

- Afromyia Kim, 1968
- Ischiolepta Lioy, 1864
- Lotobia Lioy, 1864
- Mesosphaerocera Kim, 1972
- Neosphaerocera Kim, 1972
- Parasphaerocera Spuler, 1924
- Safaria Richards, 1950
- Sphaerocera Latreille, 1804
- Trichosphaerocera Papp, 1978

Subfamily Homalomitrinae Roháček & Marshall, 1998

- Homalomitra Borgmeier, 1931
- Sphaeromitra Roháček & Marshall, 1998

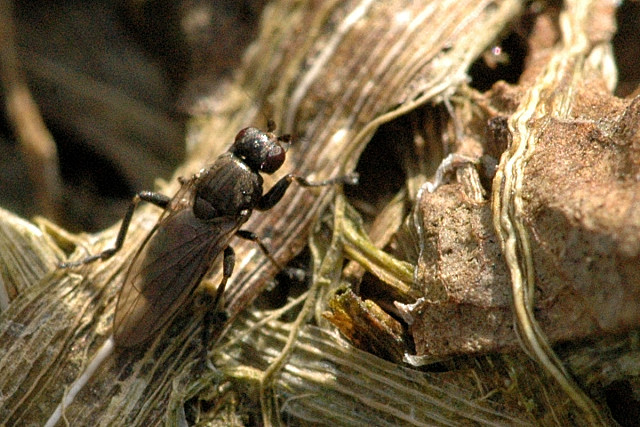
Limosina silvatica of the Limosininae

Subfamily Limosininae Frey, 1921

- Acuminiseta Duda, 1925
- Afropterogramma Papp, 2008
- Aluligera Richards, 1951
- Anatalanta Eaton, 1875
- Anomioptera Schiner, 1868
- Anommonia Schmitz, 1917
- Apterobiroina Papp, 1979
- Apteromyia Vimmer, 1929
- Aptilotella Duda, 1924
- Aptilotus Mik, 1898
- Archiceroptera Papp, 1977
- Archicollinella Duda, 1925
- Archileptocera Duda, 1920
- Archipterogrammoides Papp, 2008
- Aspinilimosina Papp, 2004
- Australimosina Papp, 2008
- Bentrovata Richards, 1973
- Biconnecta Papp, 2008
- Biroina Richards, 1973
- Bitheca Marshall, 1987
- Bromeloecia Spuler, 1924
- Cephalimosina Papp, 2008
- Ceroptera Macquart, 1835
- Ceropterella Richards, 1953
- Chaetopodella Duda, 1920
- Chaetosifemur Papp, 2008
- Chespiritos Marshall, 2000
- Coproica Rondani, 1861
- Druciatus Marshall, 1995
- Elachisoma Rondani, 1880
- Eulimosina Roháček, 1983
- Eximilimosina Papp, 2008
- Gigalimosina Roháček, 1983
- Giraffimyiella Papp, 2008
- Gobersa de Coninck, 1983
- Gonioneura Rondani, 1880
- Gonitella Papp, 2008
- Gyretria Enderlein, 1938
- Hellerella Duda, 1920
- Herniosina Roháček, 1983
- Howickia Richards, 1951
- Indiosina Papp, 1981
- Kabaria Richards, 1966
- Lepidosina Marshall & Buck, 2007
- Leptocera Olivier, 1813
- Limomyza Marshall, 1997
- Limosina Macquart, 1835
- Limosinella Richards, 1968
- Lobeliomyia Richards, 1951
- Mesaptilotus Richards, 1951
- Minialula Papp, 2008
- Minilimosina Roháček, 1983
- Mixolimosina Papp, 2008
- Monorbiseta Papp, 2008
- Monteithiana Richards, 1973
- Myrmolimosina Marshall, 2000
- Nearcticorpus Roháček & Marshall, 1982
- Ocellipsis Richards, 1938
- Ocellusia Séguy, 1955
- Opacifrons Duda, 1918
- Opalimosina Roháček, 1983
- Oribatomyia Richards, 1960
- Pachytarsella Richards, 1963
- Palaeocoprina Duda, 1920
- Papualimosina Hayashi, 2006
- Papuellicesa Koçak & Kemal, 2010
- Paracuminiseta Papp, 2008
- Paralimosina Papp, 1973
- Paramera Papp, 2008
- Paraminilimosina Papp, 2008
- Parapoecilosomella Papp, 2008
- Parapterogramma Papp, 2008
- Paraptilotus Richards, 1938
- Parasclerocoelus Marshall & Dong, 2008
- Paraspelobia Duda, 1938
- Pellucialula Papp, 2004
- Philocoprella Richards, 1929
- Phthitia Enderlein, 1938
- Piliterga Papp, 2008
- Pismira Richards, 1960
- Pleuroseta Richards, 1973
- Poecilosomella Duda, 1925
- Popondetta Richards, 1973
- Pseudacuminiseta Papp, 2008
- Pseudaspinilimosina Papp, 2008
- Pseudocollinella Duda, 1924
- Pseudopterogramma Papp, 2008
- Pteremis Rondani, 1856
- Pterogramma Spuler, 1923
- Pterogrammoides Papp, 1972
- Pullimosina Roháček, 1983
- Puncticorpus Duda, 1918
- Rachispoda Lioy, 1864
- Reunionia Papp, 1979
- Robustagramma Marshall & Cui, 2005
- Rohacekia Papp, 2008
- Rudolfina Roháček, 1987
- Sclerocoelus Marshall, 1995
- Scutelliseta Richards, 1960
- Setositibiella Papp, 2008
- Siphlopteryx Enderlein, 1908
- Spelobia Spuler, 1924
- Spinilimosina Roháček, 1983
- Telomerina Roháček, 1983
- Terrilimosina Roháček, 1983
- Thailimosina Papp, 2008
- Thoracochaeta Duda, 1918
- Trachyopella Duda, 1918
- Trilobitella Papp, 2008
- Trisetomyia Richards, 1965
- Xenolimosina Roháček, 1983

== See also ==
- Theodor Becker
- Oswald Duda
- Alexander Henry Haliday
