= Limomyza =

Scientific classification
- Kingdom: Animalia
- Phylum: Arthropoda
- Class: Insecta
- Order: Diptera
- Family: Sphaeroceridae
- Subfamily: Limosininae
- Genus: Limomyza; Marshall, 1997

Type species
- Limomyza cavernicola Marshall, 1997

Genus of flies

Limomyza is a genus of flies belonging to the family Sphaeroceridae.

== Species ==
- Limomyza archiptera Marshall, 1997
- Limomyza brevifrons (Duda, 1925)
- Limomyza cavernicola Marshall, 1997
- Limomyza hirta Marshall, 1997
- Limomyza sharkeyi Marshall, 1997
- Limomyza venia Marshall, 1997
