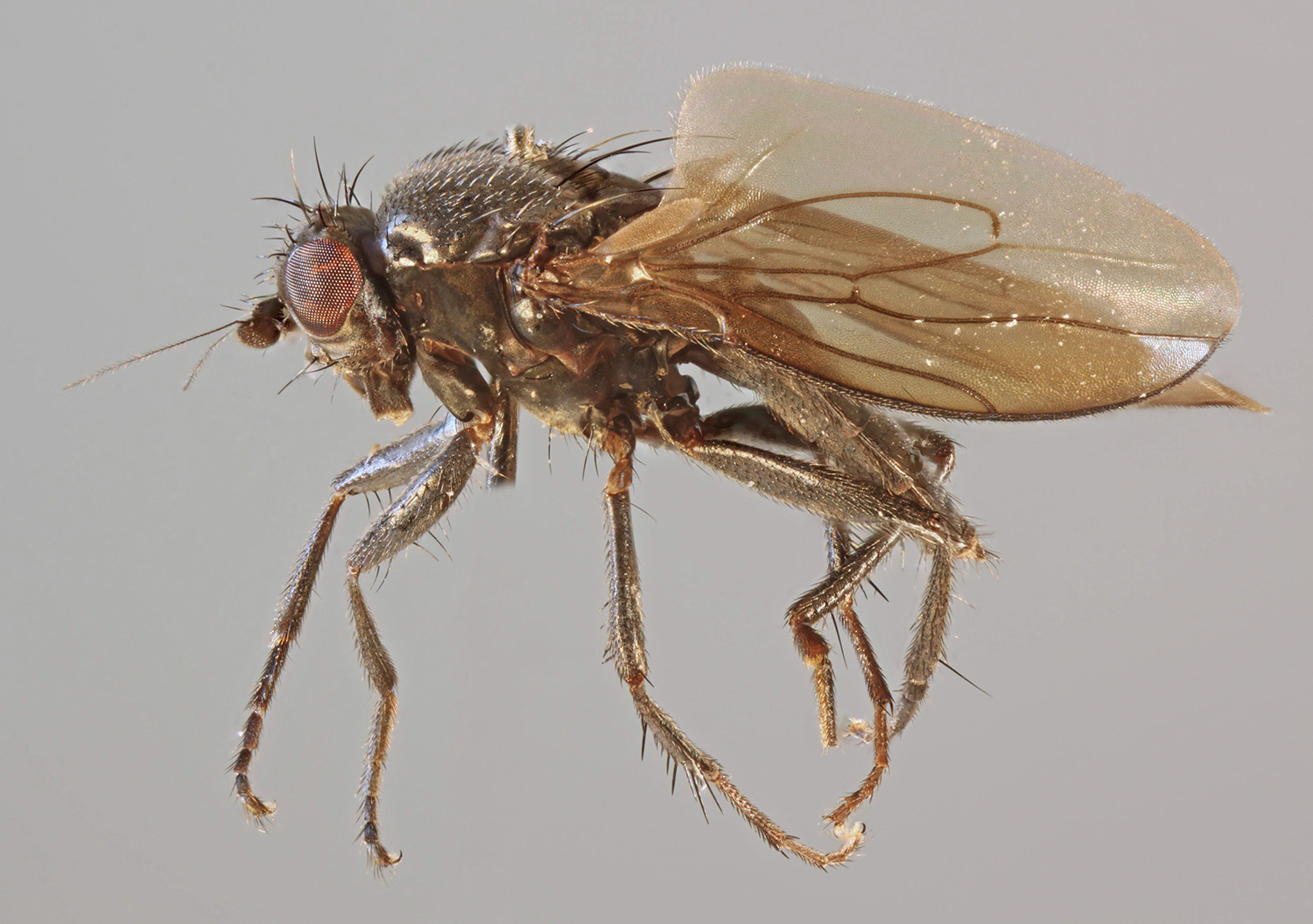
- Limosina silvatica

Scientific classification
- Kingdom: Animalia
- Phylum: Arthropoda
- Class: Insecta
- Order: Diptera
- Family: Sphaeroceridae
- Subfamily: Limosininae; Frey, 1921

Type genus
- Limosina Macquart, 1835

Synonyms
- Leptocerinae Hendel, 1928; Ceropterinae Vanschuytbroeck, 1959

= Limosininae =

Subfamily of flies

Limosininae is a subfamily of flies belonging to the family Sphaeroceridae, the lesser dung flies.

== Genera ==
Genera include:

- Acuminiseta Duda, 1925
- Afropterogramma Papp, 2008
- Aluligera Richards, 1951
- Anatalanta Eaton, 1875
- Anomioptera Schiner, 1868
- Anommonia Schmitz, 1917
- Apterobiroina Papp, 1979
- Apteromyia Vimmer, 1929
- Aptilotella Duda, 1924
- Aptilotus Mik, 1898
- Archiceroptera Papp, 1977
- Archicollinella Duda, 1925
- Archileptocera Duda, 1920
- Archipterogrammoides Papp, 2008
- Aspinilimosina Papp, 2004
- Australimosina Papp, 2008
- Bentrovata Richards, 1973
- Biconnecta Papp, 2008
- Biroina Richards, 1973
- Bitheca Marshall, 1987
- Bromeloecia Spuler, 1924
- Cephalimosina Papp, 2008
- Ceroptera Macquart, 1835
- Ceropterella Richards, 1953
- Chaetopodella Duda, 1920
- Chaetosifemur Papp, 2008
- Chespiritos Marshall, 2000
- Coproica Rondani, 1861
- Druciatus Marshall, 1995
- Elachisoma Rondani, 1880
- Eulimosina Roháček, 1983
- Eximilimosina Papp, 2008
- Gigalimosina Roháček, 1983
- Giraffimyiella Papp, 2008
- Gobersa de Coninck, 1983
- Gonioneura Rondani, 1880
- Gonitella Papp, 2008
- Gyretria Enderlein, 1938
- Hellerella Duda, 1920
- Herniosina Roháček, 1983
- Howickia Richards, 1951
- Indiosina Papp, 1981
- Kabaria Richards, 1966
- Lepidosina Marshall & Buck, 2007
- Leptocera Olivier, 1813
- Limomyza Marshall, 1997
- Limosina Macquart, 1835
- Limosinella Richards, 1968
- Lobeliomyia Richards, 1951
- Mesaptilotus Richards, 1951
- Minialula Papp, 2008
- Minilimosina Roháček, 1983
- Mixolimosina Papp, 2008
- Monorbiseta Papp, 2008
- Monteithiana Richards, 1973
- Myrmolimosina Marshall, 2000
- Nearcticorpus Roháček & Marshall, 1982
- Ocellipsis Richards, 1938
- Ocellusia Séguy, 1955
- Opacifrons Duda, 1918
- Opalimosina Roháček, 1983
- Oribatomyia Richards, 1960
- Otwayia Richards, 1973
- Pachytarsella Richards, 1963
- Palaeocoprina Duda, 1920
- Papualimosina Hayashi, 2006
- Papuellicesa Koçak & Kemal, 2010
- Paracuminiseta Papp, 2008
- Paralimosina Papp, 1973
- Paramera Papp, 2008
- Paraminilimosina Papp, 2008
- Parapoecilosomella Papp, 2008
- Parapterogramma Papp, 2008
- Paraptilotus Richards, 1938
- Parasclerocoelus Marshall & Dong, 2008
- Paraspelobia Duda, 1938
- Pellucialula Papp, 2004
- Philocoprella Richards, 1929
- Phthitia Enderlein, 1938
- Piliterga Papp, 2008
- Pismira Richards, 1960
- Pleuroseta Richards, 1973
- Poecilosomella Duda, 1925
- Popondetta Richards, 1973
- Pseudacuminiseta Papp, 2008
- Pseudaspinilimosina Papp, 2008
- Pseudocollinella Duda, 1924
- Pseudopterogramma Papp, 2008
- Pteremis Rondani, 1856
- Pterogramma Spuler, 1923
- Pterogrammoides Papp, 1972
- Pullimosina Roháček, 1983
- Puncticorpus Duda, 1918
- Rachispoda Lioy, 1864
- Reunionia Papp, 1979
- Robustagramma Marshall & Cui, 2005
- Rohacekia Papp, 2008
- Rudolfina Roháček, 1987
- Sclerocoelus Marshall, 1995
- Scutelliseta Richards, 1960
- Setositibiella Papp, 2008
- Siphlopteryx Enderlein, 1908
- Spelobia Spuler, 1924
- Spinilimosina Roháček, 1983
- Telomerina Roháček, 1983
- Terrilimosina Roháček, 1983
- Thailimosina Papp, 2008
- Thoracochaeta Duda, 1918
- Trachyopella Duda, 1918
- Trilobitella Papp, 2008
- Trisetomyia Richards, 1965
- Xenolimosina Roháček, 1983
