= Acuminiseta =

Scientific classification
- Kingdom: Animalia
- Phylum: Arthropoda
- Class: Insecta
- Order: Diptera
- Family: Sphaeroceridae
- Subfamily: Limosininae
- Genus: Acuminiseta; Duda, 1925

Type species
- Limosina pallidicornis Villeneuve, 1916

Genus of flies

Acuminiseta is a genus of flies belonging to the family Sphaeroceridae.

== Species ==
- A. cercalis (Richards, 1973)
- A. ceropteroides Papp, 2008
- A. ciliata (Duda, 1925)
- A. elegantula (Duda, 1925)
- A. flavicornis (Duda, 1925)
- A. longiventris (Duda, 1925)
- A. pallidicornis (Villeneuve, 1916)
- A. rugarii (Vanschuytbroeck, 1950)
