= Gymnometopina =

Scientific classification
- Kingdom: Animalia
- Phylum: Arthropoda
- Class: Insecta
- Order: Diptera
- Family: Sphaeroceridae
- Subfamily: Copromyzinae
- Genus: Gymnometopina; Hedicke, 1923

Type species
- Borborus clunicrus Duda, 1923

Synonyms
- Gymnometopa Duda, 1923

Genus of flies

Gymnometopina is a genus of flies belonging to the family Sphaeroceridae.

== Species ==
- G. apta (Curran, 1931)
- G. clunicrus (Duda, 1923)
- G. dudai Norrbom, 1987
- G. fulgida Norrbom, 1987
- G. garambaensis (Vanschuytbroeck, 1959)
- G. haasae Norrbom, 1987
- G. halidayi Norrbom, 1987
- G. kibokoensis (Vanschuytbroeck, 1959)
- G. lucida (Séguy, 1933)
- G. magna Norrbom, 1987
- G. marshalli Norrbom, 1987
- G. richardsi Norrbom, 1987
- G. scolocerca Norrbom, 1987
