= Palaeoceroptera =

Scientific classification
- Kingdom: Animalia
- Phylum: Arthropoda
- Class: Insecta
- Order: Diptera
- Family: Sphaeroceridae
- Subfamily: Copromyzinae
- Genus: Palaeoceroptera; Duda, 1929

Type species
- Archileptocera boliviensis Duda, 1929

Genus of flies

Palaeoceroptera is a genus of flies belonging to the family Sphaeroceridae.

== Species ==
- Palaeoceroptera boliviensis (Duda, 1929)
- Palaeoceroptera clefta Marshall, 1998
