= Spinilimosina =

Scientific classification
- Kingdom: Animalia
- Phylum: Arthropoda
- Class: Insecta
- Order: Diptera
- Family: Sphaeroceridae
- Subfamily: Limosininae
- Genus: Spinilimosina; Roháček, 1983

Type species
- Limosina (Scotophilella) brevicostata Duda, 1918

Synonyms
- Spinilimosina Roháček, 1982

Genus of flies

Spinilimosina is a genus of flies belonging to the family Sphaeroceridae.

== Species ==
- Spinilimosina brevicostata (Duda, 1918)
- Spinilimosina pectinata (Tenorio, 1968)
- Spinilimosina rufifrons (Duda, 1925)
- Spinilimosina tetrasticha (Richards, 1973)
