= Gonioneura =

Scientific classification
- Kingdom: Animalia
- Phylum: Arthropoda
- Class: Insecta
- Order: Diptera
- Family: Sphaeroceridae
- Subfamily: Limosininae
- Genus: Gonioneura; Rondani, 1880

Type species
- Gonioneura bisangula Rondani, 1880

Synonyms
- Halidayina Duda, 1918; Halidayini Spuler, 1924

Genus of flies

Gonioneura is a genus of flies belonging to the family Sphaeroceridae.

== Species ==
- Gonioneura asymmetrica (Marshall, 1982)
- Gonioneura exserta (Marshall, 1982)
- Gonioneura spinipennis (Haliday, 1836)
- Gonioneura xinjiangensis (Marshall in Marshall & Sun, 1995)
