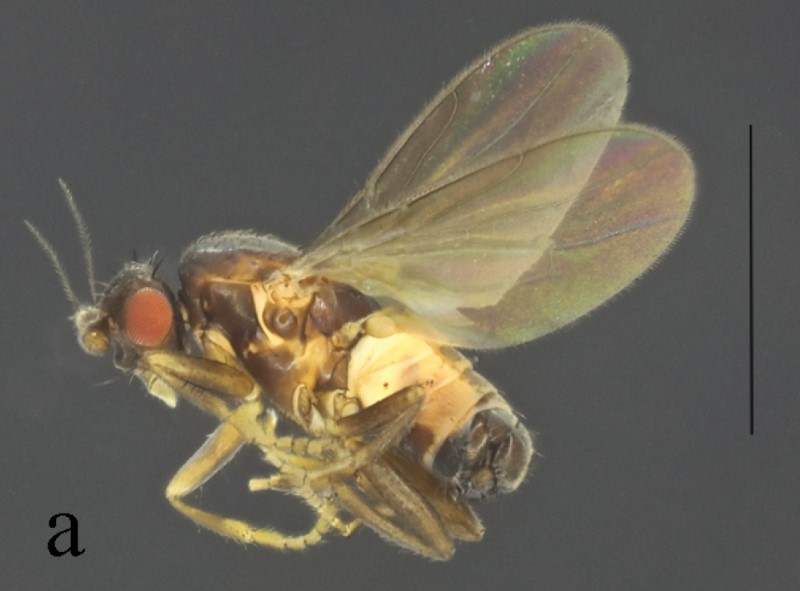
- Terrilimosina longipexa

Scientific classification
- Kingdom: Animalia
- Phylum: Arthropoda
- Class: Insecta
- Order: Diptera
- Family: Sphaeroceridae
- Subfamily: Limosininae
- Genus: Terrilimosina; Roháček, 1983

Type species
- Limosina racovitzai Bezzi, 1911

Synonyms
- Terrilimosina Roháček, 1982

= Terrilimosina =

Genus of flies

Terrilimosina is a genus of flies belonging to the family Sphaeroceridae.

== Species ==
- T. brevipexa Marshall, 1987
- T. corrivalis (Villeneuve, 1918)
- T. deemingi Marshall, 1987
- T. intricata Papp, 1991
- T. longipexa Marshall, 1987
- T. nana Hayashi, 1992
- T. parabrevipexa Su & Liu, 2009
- T. paralongipexa Hayashi, 1992
- T. parasmetanai Su & Liu, 2009
- T. pexa Marshall, 1985
- T. racovitzai (Bezzi, 1911)
- T. schmitzi (Duda, 1918)
- T. smetanai Marshall, 1987
- T. unio Marshall, 1987
