= Elachisoma =

Scientific classification
- Kingdom: Animalia
- Phylum: Arthropoda
- Class: Insecta
- Order: Diptera
- Family: Sphaeroceridae
- Subfamily: Limosininae
- Genus: Elachisoma; Rondani, 1880

Type species
- Limosina nigerrima Haliday, 1836

Synonyms
- Elachiosoma Spuler, 1925; Elachisona Vanschuytbroeck, 1950

Genus of flies

Elachisoma is a genus of flies belonging to the family Sphaeroceridae.

== Species ==
- Elachisoma afrotropicum Papp, 1983
- Elachisoma approximatum (Malloch, 1913)
- Elachisoma aterrimum (Haliday, 1833)
- Elachisoma bajzae Papp, 1983
- Elachisoma braacki Papp, 1983
- Elachisoma euphorbiae Papp, 1977
- Elachisoma kerteszi (Duda, 1924)
- Elachisoma pilosum (Duda, 1924)
