= Archicollinella =

Scientific classification
- Kingdom: Animalia
- Phylum: Arthropoda
- Class: Insecta
- Order: Diptera
- Family: Sphaeroceridae
- Subfamily: Limosininae
- Genus: Archicollinella; Duda, 1925

Type species
- Archicollinella caerulea Duda, 1925

Synonyms
- Archicolinella Richards, 1931; Schnuseella Duda, 1925

Genus of flies

Archicollinella is a genus of flies belonging to the family Sphaeroceridae.

== Species ==
- Archicollinella caerulea (Duda, 1925)
- Archicollinella dolichoptera (Richards, 1963)
- Archicollinella penteseta (Richards, 1929)
