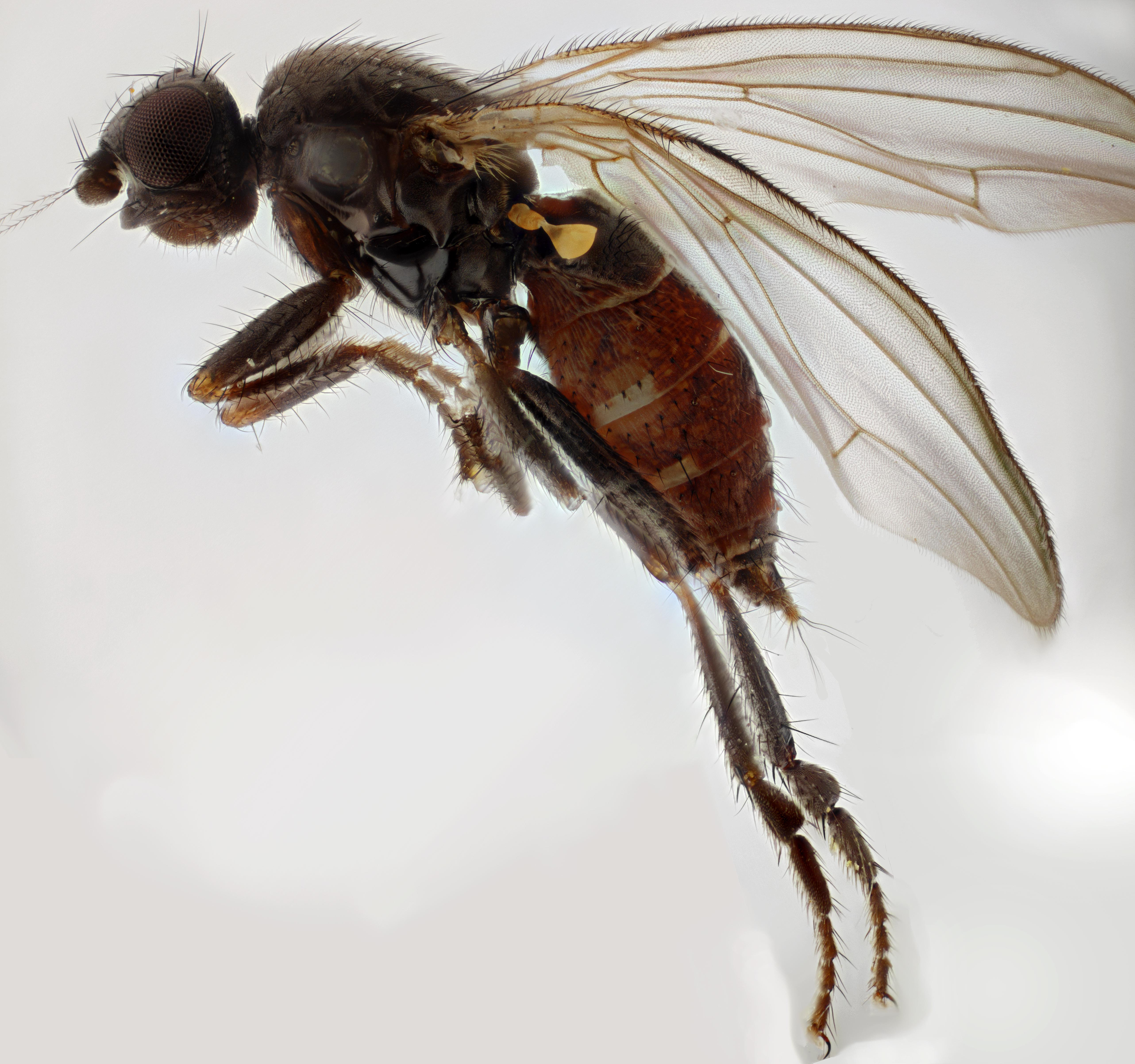
- Borborillus uncinatus

Scientific classification
- Kingdom: Animalia
- Phylum: Arthropoda
- Class: Insecta
- Order: Diptera
- Family: Sphaeroceridae
- Subfamily: Copromyzinae
- Genus: Borborillus; Duda, 1923

Type species
- Borborus uncinatus Duda, 1921

= Borborillus =

Genus of flies

Borborillus is a genus of flies belonging to the family Sphaeroceridae.

== Species ==
- Borborillus uncinatus (Duda, 1923)
- Borborillus vitripennis (Meigen, 1830)
