= Robustagramma =

Scientific classification
- Kingdom: Animalia
- Phylum: Arthropoda
- Class: Insecta
- Order: Diptera
- Family: Sphaeroceridae
- Subfamily: Limosininae
- Genus: Robustagramma; Marshall & Cui, 2005

Type species
- Leptocera (Scotophilella) robusta Spuler, 1925

Genus of flies

Robustagramma is a genus of flies belonging to the family of the Sphaeroceridae.

== Species ==
- R. acutistylum Marshall & Cui, 2005
- R. aequale Marshall & Cui, 2005
- R. altifrons Marshall & Cui, 2005
- R. angusticauda Marshall & Cui, 2005
- R. angustistylum Marshall & Cui, 2005
- R. arizonense Marshall & Cui, 2005
- R. atratum Marshall & Cui, 2005
- R. biangulatum Marshall & Cui, 2005
- R. binitidum Marshall & Cui, 2005
- R. bolivarense Marshall & Cui, 2005
- R. brasilense Marshall & Cui, 2005
- R. brevicauda Marshall & Cui, 2005
- R. brevicilium Marshall & Cui, 2005
- R. crassipalpus Marshall & Cui, 2005
- R. crassisaccus Marshall & Cui, 2005
- R. cultriforme Marshall & Cui, 2005
- R. dilatatum Marshall & Cui, 2005
- R. disjunctum Marshall & Cui, 2005
- R. flavistylum Marshall & Cui, 2005
- R. gigantisclerosum Marshall & Cui, 2005
- R. grenadense Marshall & Cui, 2005
- R. hebes Marshall & Cui, 2005
- R. incurvum Marshall & Cui, 2005
- R. kittsense Marshall & Cui, 2005
- R. latistylum Marshall & Cui, 2005
- R. lingulatum Marshall & Cui, 2005
- R. longiseta Marshall & Cui, 2005
- R. longistylum Marshall & Cui, 2005
- R. luciense Marshall & Cui, 2005
- R. macrosternum Marshall & Cui, 2005
- R. mayense Marshall & Cui, 2005
- R. minutiseta Marshall & Cui, 2005
- R. mirabile Marshall & Cui, 2005
- R. multiseta Marshall & Cui, 2005
- R. nigrivittatum Marshall & Cui, 2005
- R. obscuratum Marshall & Cui, 2005
- R. obscurifrons Marshall & Cui, 2005
- R. oculiculus Marshall & Cui, 2005
- R. orthogonium Marshall & Cui, 2005
- R. ovipenne (Duda, 1925)
- R. pallidistylum Marshall & Cui, 2005
- R. paralongiseta Marshall & Cui, 2005
- R. parauniseta Marshall & Cui, 2005
- R. rarum Marshall & Cui, 2005
- R. robustinervus Marshall & Cui, 2005
- R. robustum (Spuler, 1925)
- R. setilamella Marshall & Cui, 2005
- R. setituberosum Marshall & Cui, 2005
- R. setosum Marshall & Cui, 2005
- R. sinuosum Marshall & Cui, 2005
- R. spinatimargo Marshall & Cui, 2005
- R. triangulatum Marshall & Cui, 2005
- R. uniseta Marshall & Cui, 2005
- R. vulgare Marshall & Cui, 2005
