= Puncticorpus =

Scientific classification
- Kingdom: Animalia
- Phylum: Arthropoda
- Class: Insecta
- Order: Diptera
- Family: Sphaeroceridae
- Subfamily: Limosininae
- Genus: Puncticorpus; Duda, 1918

Type species
- Limosina (Puncticorpus) brevipennis Duda, 1918

Genus of flies

Puncticorpus is a genus of flies belonging to the family Sphaeroceridae.

== Species ==
- Puncticorpus cribratum (Villeneuve, 1918)
- Puncticorpus lusitanicum (Richards, 1963)
- Puncticorpus susannae Papp, 1974
