= Palaeolimosina =

Scientific classification
- Kingdom: Animalia
- Phylum: Arthropoda
- Clade: Pancrustacea
- Class: Insecta
- Order: Diptera
- Family: Sphaeroceridae
- Subfamily: Copromyzinae
- Genus: Palaeolimosina; Duda, 1920

Type species
- Archileptocera nigrina Duda, 1920

Genus of flies

Palaeolimosina is a genus of flies belonging to the family Sphaeroceridae.

== Species ==
- Palaeolimosina nigrina (Duda, 1920) Bolivia
