= Pterogramma =

Scientific classification
- Kingdom: Animalia
- Phylum: Arthropoda
- Class: Insecta
- Order: Diptera
- Family: Sphaeroceridae
- Subfamily: Limosininae
- Genus: Pterogramma; Spuler, 1924

Type species
- Limosina sublugubrina Malloch, 1912

Synonyms
- Mallochella Duda, 1920; Mallochella Duda, 1925

Genus of flies

Pterogramma is a genus of flies belonging to the family of the Sphaeroceridae.

== Species ==
- P. adustum Smith & Marshall, 2004
- P. aestivale (Richards, 1973)
- P. ancora Smith & Marshall, 2004
- P. annectens (Richards, 1964)
- P. aquatile Smith & Marshall, 2004
- P. atronaricum Smith & Marshall, 2004
- P. brevivenosum (Tenorio, 1967)
- P. cardisomi Norrbom & Kim in Norrbom, Kim & Fee, 1984
- P. conicum (Richards, 1946)
- P. costaphiletrix Smith & Marshall, 2004
- P. deemingi (Richards, 1973)
- P. flaviceps Smith & Marshall, 2004
- P. gilviventre Smith & Marshall, 2004
- P. inconspicuum (Malloch, 1914)
- P. infernaceps Smith & Marshall, 2004
- P. insulare Papp, 1972
- P. jubar Smith & Marshall, 2004
- P. lobosternum Smith & Marshall, 2004
- P. luridobregma Smith & Marshall, 2004
- P. luxor (Spuler, 1925)
- P. madare (Spuler, 1925)
- P. meridionale (Malloch, 1914)
- P. monticola (Malloch, 1914)
- P. morretense Smith & Marshall, 2004
- P. nexoverpa Smith & Marshall, 2004
- P. nigrotibiale Smith & Marshall, 2004
- P. ochrofrons Smith & Marshall, 2004
- P. ovipenne (Duda, 1925)
- P. palliceps (C. W. Johnson, 1915)
- P. parameridionale (Duda, 1925)
- P. poecilopterum (Malloch, 1914)
- P. portalense Smith & Marshall, 2004
- P. robustum (Spuler, 1925)
- P. rutilans (Duda, 1925)
- P. simplicicrus (Duda, 1925)
- P. stictopenne Smith & Marshall, 2004
- P. sublugubrinum (Malloch, 1912)
- P. substitutum (Richards, 1961)
- P. substriatum (Duda, 1925)
- P. vittatum (Malloch, 1914)
