= Eximilimosina =

Scientific classification
- Kingdom: Animalia
- Phylum: Arthropoda
- Class: Insecta
- Order: Diptera
- Family: Sphaeroceridae
- Subfamily: Limosininae
- Genus: Eximilimosina; Papp, 2008

Type species
- Paralimosina eximia Papp, 1991

Genus of flies

Eximilimosina is a genus of flies belonging to the family Sphaeroceridae.

== Species ==
- Eximilimosina eximia (Papp, 1991)
- Eximilimosina elegantula (Duda, 1925)
- Eximilimosina major Papp, 2008
- Eximilimosina thailandica Papp, 2008
