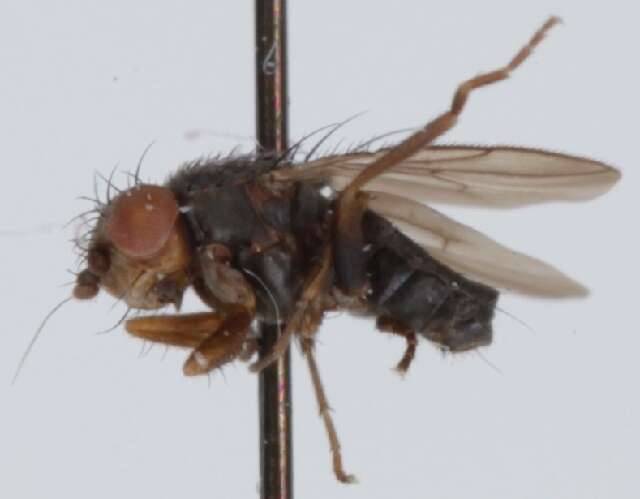
- Pteremis fenestralis

Scientific classification
- Kingdom: Animalia
- Phylum: Arthropoda
- Class: Insecta
- Order: Diptera
- Family: Sphaeroceridae
- Subfamily: Limosininae
- Genus: Pteremis; Rondani, 1880

Type species
- Borborus nivalis Haliday, 1833

Synonyms
- Pterenis Schiner, 1864; Pterennis Schiner, 1864; Coprobia Lioy, 1864; Stenhammaria Duda, 1918; Paraspelobia Duda, 1938

= Pteremis =

Genus of flies

Pteremis is a genus of flies belonging to the family Sphaeroceridae.

== Species ==
The following species are included in the genus as of 2024:

- Pteremis apterina Rohacek, 2024 Azores
- Pteremis canaria (Papp, 1977) Canary islands
- Pteremis fenestralis (Fallén, 1820) Europe
- Pteremis ferreus Rohacek, 2024 Canary islands
- Pteremis kaszabi (Papp, 1973) Mongolia
- Pteremis mongolicus (Papp, 1973) Mongolia
- Pteremis pulliceps Rohacek, 2024 Madeira
- Pteremis tenebricus Rohacek, 2024 Spain
- Pteremis unicus (Spuler, 1924) USA (Wyoming)
- Pteremis vlasovi (Duda, 1938) Turkmenistan
- Pteremis wirthi (Marshall, 1984) Canada
