= Rudolfina =

Scientific classification
- Kingdom: Animalia
- Phylum: Arthropoda
- Class: Insecta
- Order: Diptera
- Family: Sphaeroceridae
- Subfamily: Limosininae
- Genus: Rudolfina; Roháček, 1987

Type species
- Limosina rozkosnyi Roháček, 1975

Synonyms
- Rudolfia Roháček, 1982

Genus of flies

Rudolfina is a genus of flies belonging to the family of the Sphaeroceridae.

== Species ==
- Rudolfina cavernicola Marshall & Fitzgerald, 1997
- Rudolfina digitata Marshall, 1991
- Rudolfina opuntiae (Richards, 1967)
- Rudolfina prominens (Duda, 1925)
- Rudolfina rozkosnyi (Roháček, 1975)
