= Biroina =

Scientific classification
- Kingdom: Animalia
- Phylum: Arthropoda
- Class: Insecta
- Order: Diptera
- Family: Sphaeroceridae
- Subfamily: Limosininae
- Genus: Biroina; Richards, 1973

Type species
- Limosina myrmecophila Knab & Malloch, 1912

Synonyms
- Biroella Duda, 1925; Biróella Duda, 1925

Genus of flies

Biroina is a genus of flies belonging to the family Sphaeroceridae.

== Species ==
- B. brevior Richards, 1973
- B. burckhardti Papp, 1995
- B. capitalis (Richards, 1973)
- B. dodo (Richards, 1973)
- B. dorrigonis (Richards, 1973)
- B. fenestrata (Richards, 1973)
- B. fuscalis (Richards, 1973)
- B. hardyina (Richards, 1973)
- B. myersi (Richards, 1973)
- B. myrmecophila (Knab & Malloch, 1912)
- B. nitidipleura (Richards, 1973)
- B. orientalis Papp, 1995
- B. percostata (Richards, 1973)
- B. subsinuata (Richards, 1973)
- B. symmetrica (Richards, 1973)
- B. topali Papp, 1995
- B. trivittata (Richards, 1973)
- B. vernalis (Richards, 1973)
- B. wilsoni (Richards, 1973)
