= Pterogramma palliceps =

Scientific classification
- Domain: Eukaryota
- Kingdom: Animalia
- Phylum: Arthropoda
- Class: Insecta
- Order: Diptera
- Family: Sphaeroceridae
- Genus: Pterogramma
- Species: P. palliceps

Binomial name
- Pterogramma palliceps (Johnson, 1915)

Synonyms
- Leptocera palliceps Johnson, 1915; Leptocera substituta Richards, 1961

Species of fly

Pterogramma palliceps is a species of lesser dung flies (insects in the family Sphaeroceridae).
