= Archileptocera =

Scientific classification
- Kingdom: Animalia
- Phylum: Arthropoda
- Class: Insecta
- Order: Diptera
- Family: Sphaeroceridae
- Subfamily: Limosininae
- Genus: Archileptocera; Duda, 1920

Type species
- Archicollinella luteonigripes Duda, 1920

Synonyms
- Lamprosomella Duda, 1920

Genus of flies

Archileptocera is a genus of flies belonging to the family Sphaeroceridae, the lesser dung flies.

== Species ==
- Archicollinella lutea Marshall, 1998
- Archicollinella luteonigripes (Duda, 1920)
- Archicollinella nigra Marshall, 1998
