= Achaetothorax =

Scientific classification
- Kingdom: Animalia
- Phylum: Arthropoda
- Class: Insecta
- Order: Diptera
- Family: Sphaeroceridae
- Subfamily: Copromyzinae
- Genus: Achaetothorax; Hedicke, 1923

Type species
- Gymnothorax abyssinica Duda, 1923

Synonyms
- Gymnothorax Duda, 1923; Femoromyza Richards, 1939

Genus of flies

Achaetothorax is a genus of flies belonging to the family Sphaeroceridae, the lesser dung flies.

== Species ==
- A. abyssinica (Duda, 1923)
- A. acrostichalis Papp & Norrbom, 1992
- A. completus Norrbom & Papp, 1994
- A. concavus Norrbom & Papp, 1994
- A. coninckae Norrbom & Papp, 1994
- A. crypticus Papp & Norrbom, 1992
- A. flavipes Papp & Norrbom, 1992
- A. grootaerti Norrbom & Papp, 1994
- A. malayensis Papp & Norrbom, 1992
- A. medialis Norrbom & Papp, 1994
- A. pectinatus Norrbom & Papp, 1994
- A. rhinocerotis (Richards, 1939)
- A. straeleninus (Richards, 1980)
- A. trochanteratus Papp & Norrbom, 1992
- A. vojnitsi Papp & Norrbom, 1992
- A. whittingtoni Norrbom & Papp, 1994
