= Archiborborus =

Scientific classification
- Kingdom: Animalia
- Phylum: Arthropoda
- Class: Insecta
- Order: Diptera
- Family: Sphaeroceridae
- Subfamily: Copromyzinae
- Genus: Archiborborus; Duda, 1921

Type species
- Archiborborus submaculatus Duda, 1921

Synonyms
- Huapia Richards, 1931; Procopromyza Richards, 1931

Genus of flies

Archiborborus is a genus of flies belonging to the family Sphaeroceridae.

== Species ==
- A. albicans Richards, 1931
- A. alternatus (Rondani, 1868)
- A. annulatus Richards, 1963
- A. argentinensis Papp, 1977
- A. calceatus Duda, 1921
- A. chaetosus Richards, 1961
- A. chilensis Richards, 1931
- A. edwardsi Richards, 1931
- A. femoralis (Blanchard, 1852)
- A. hirtus (Bigot, 1888)
- A. hirtipes (Macquart, 1843)
- A. koenigi Duda, 1932
- A. maculipennis Duda, 1921
- A. maximus Richards, 1961
- A. mexicanus Steyskal, 1973
- A. microphthalma Richards, 1931
- A. nitidicollis (Becker, 1919)
- A. orbitalis Duda, 1921
- A. quadrinotus (Bigot, 1888)
- A. setosus Duda, 1921
- A. simplicimanus Richards, 1931
- A. submaculatus Duda, 1921
