= Paraspelobia =

Scientific classification
- Kingdom: Animalia
- Phylum: Arthropoda
- Clade: Pancrustacea
- Class: Insecta
- Order: Diptera
- Family: Sphaeroceridae
- Subfamily: Limosininae
- Genus: Paraspelobia; Duda, 1938

Type species
- Paraspelobia vlasovi Duda, 1938

Genus of flies

Paraspelobia is a genus of flies belonging to the family Sphaeroceridae.

== Species ==
- P. vlasovi (Duda, 1938)
