= Parasclerocoelus =

Scientific classification
- Kingdom: Animalia
- Phylum: Arthropoda
- Class: Insecta
- Order: Diptera
- Family: Sphaeroceridae
- Subfamily: Limosininae
- Genus: Parasclerocoelus; Marshall & Dong, 2008

Type species
- Leptocera (Scotophilella) mediospinosus Duda, 1925

Genus of flies

Parasclerocoelus is a genus of flies belonging to the family Sphaeroceridae.

== Species ==
- Parasclerocoelus mediospinosus (Duda, 1925)
