= Gyretria =

Scientific classification
- Kingdom: Animalia
- Phylum: Arthropoda
- Clade: Pancrustacea
- Class: Insecta
- Order: Diptera
- Family: Sphaeroceridae
- Subfamily: Limosininae
- Genus: Gyretria; Enderlein, 1938

Type species
- Gyretria binodatipes Enderlein, 1938

Synonyms
- Alima Duda, 1938; Alma Richards, 1967

Genus of flies

Gyretria is a genus of flies belonging to the family Sphaeroceridae.

== Species ==
- Gyretria biseta (Duda, 1925)
- Gyretria melanogaster (Thomson, 1869)
