= Dudaia =

Scientific classification
- Kingdom: Animalia
- Phylum: Arthropoda
- Class: Insecta
- Order: Diptera
- Family: Sphaeroceridae
- Subfamily: Copromyzinae
- Genus: Dudaia; Hedicke, 1923

Type species
- Borborus flavocincta Duda, 1923

Synonyms
- Dolichocera Duda, 1923; Afroborborus Curran, 1931

Genus of flies

Dudaia is a genus of flies belonging to the family Sphaeroceridae, the lesser dung flies.

== Species ==
- D. congoensis (Vanschuytbroeck, 1950)
- D. flavocincta (Duda, 1923)
- D. humeralis (Hackman, 1965)
- D. jeanneli (Richards, 1938)
- D. keiseri (Hackman, 1967)
- D. minima (Vanschuytbroeck, 1959)
- D. simulatilis (Richards, 1980)
- D. straeleni (Vanschuytbroeck, 1948)
- D. trispinosa (Vanschuytbroeck, 1959)
- D. tumida (Curran, 1931)
- D. uelensis (Vanschuytbroeck, 1959)
- D. upembaensis (Vanschuytbroeck, 1959)
