= Aptilotus =

Scientific classification
- Kingdom: Animalia
- Phylum: Arthropoda
- Clade: Pancrustacea
- Class: Insecta
- Order: Diptera
- Family: Sphaeroceridae
- Subfamily: Limosininae
- Genus: Aptilotus; Mik, 1898

Type species
- Aptilotus paradoxus Mik, 1898

Synonyms
- Aptitolus Hackman, 1969; Americaptilotus Richards, 1951; Carolinaptera Richards, 1967; Minocellina Papp, 1981; Canarisina Roháček, 1983; Roubalia Vimmer, 1931; Canarisina Roháček, 1982

Genus of flies

Aptilotus is a genus of flies belonging to the family Sphaeroceridae.

== Species ==
- A. anapterus (Papp & Roháček, 1981)
- A. appendix Papp, 1991
- A. avolans (Roháček & Papp, 1983)
- A. beckeri (Duda, 1918)
- A. besucheti (Papp, 1981)
- A. binotatus Marshall in Marshall & Smith, 1990
- A. borealis Malloch, 1913
- A. carbonicolor (Richards, 1959)
- A. concavus (Spuler, 1925)
- A. cruciatus Marshall, 1983
- A. franzi (Papp & Roháček, 1981)
- A. glabrifrons Marshall in Marshall & Smith, 1990
- A. gomerensis (Papp & Roháček, 1981)
- A. longinervis Hayashi, 1989
- A. luctuosus (Spuler, 1925)
- A. luteoscapus Marshall, 1983
- A. martini Wheeler & Marshall, 1989
- A. nigrimera Marshall, 1997
- A. nigriphallus Marshall in Marshall & Smith, 1990
- A. nigriscapus Marshall, 1983
- A. nigritibia Marshall, 1997
- A. paradoxus Mik, 1898
- A. parvipennis (Spuler, 1924)
- A. pilifemoratus (Papp & Roháček, 1981)
- A. pogophallus Marshall in Marshall & Smith, 1990
- A. politus (Williston, 1893)
- A. pulex (Richards, 1967)
- A. rufiscapus Marshall in Marshall & Smith, 1990
- A. spatulatus Marshall, 1983
- A. spinistylus Marshall in Marshall & Smith, 1990
- A. thaii (Papp, 1989)
- A. zumbadoi Marshall, 1997
