= Ceroptera =

Scientific classification
- Kingdom: Animalia
- Phylum: Arthropoda
- Clade: Pancrustacea
- Class: Insecta
- Order: Diptera
- Family: Sphaeroceridae
- Subfamily: Limosininae
- Genus: Ceroptera; Macquart, 1835

Type species
- Borborus rufitarsis Meigen, 1830

Synonyms
- Pseudosphaerocera Strobl, 1902; Trichocypsela Villeneuve, 1916; Trychocypsela Vanschuytbroeck, 1951

Genus of flies

Ceroptera is a genus of flies belonging to the family Sphaeroceridae.

== Species ==
- C. aharonii Duda, 1938
- C. algira (Villeneuve, 1916)
- C. alluaudi (Villeneuve, 1917)
- C. brincki Hackman, 1965
- C. catharsii Richards, 1953
- C. crispa (Duda, 1925)
- C. ealensis Vanschuytbroeck, 1951
- C. equitans (Collin, 1910)
- C. femorata Hackman, 1965
- C. flava Vanschuytbroeck, 1959
- C. ghanensis Papp, 1977
- C. ghesquierei Vanschuytbroeck, 1951
- C. intermedia Hackman, 1965
- C. lacteipennis (Villeneuve, 1916)
- C. longicauda Marshall in Marshall & Montagnes, 1988
- C. longiseta (Villeneuve, 1916)
- C. nasuta (Villeneuve, 1916)
- C. ndelelensis Vanschuytbroeck, 1959
- C. pelengensis Vanschuytbroeck, 1959
- C. rubricornis (Duda, 1918)
- C. rudebecki Hackman, 1965
- C. rufitarsis (Meigen, 1830)
- C. setigera Vanschuytbroeck, 1945
- C. sivinskii Marshall, 1983
- C. ungulata Hackman, 1965
