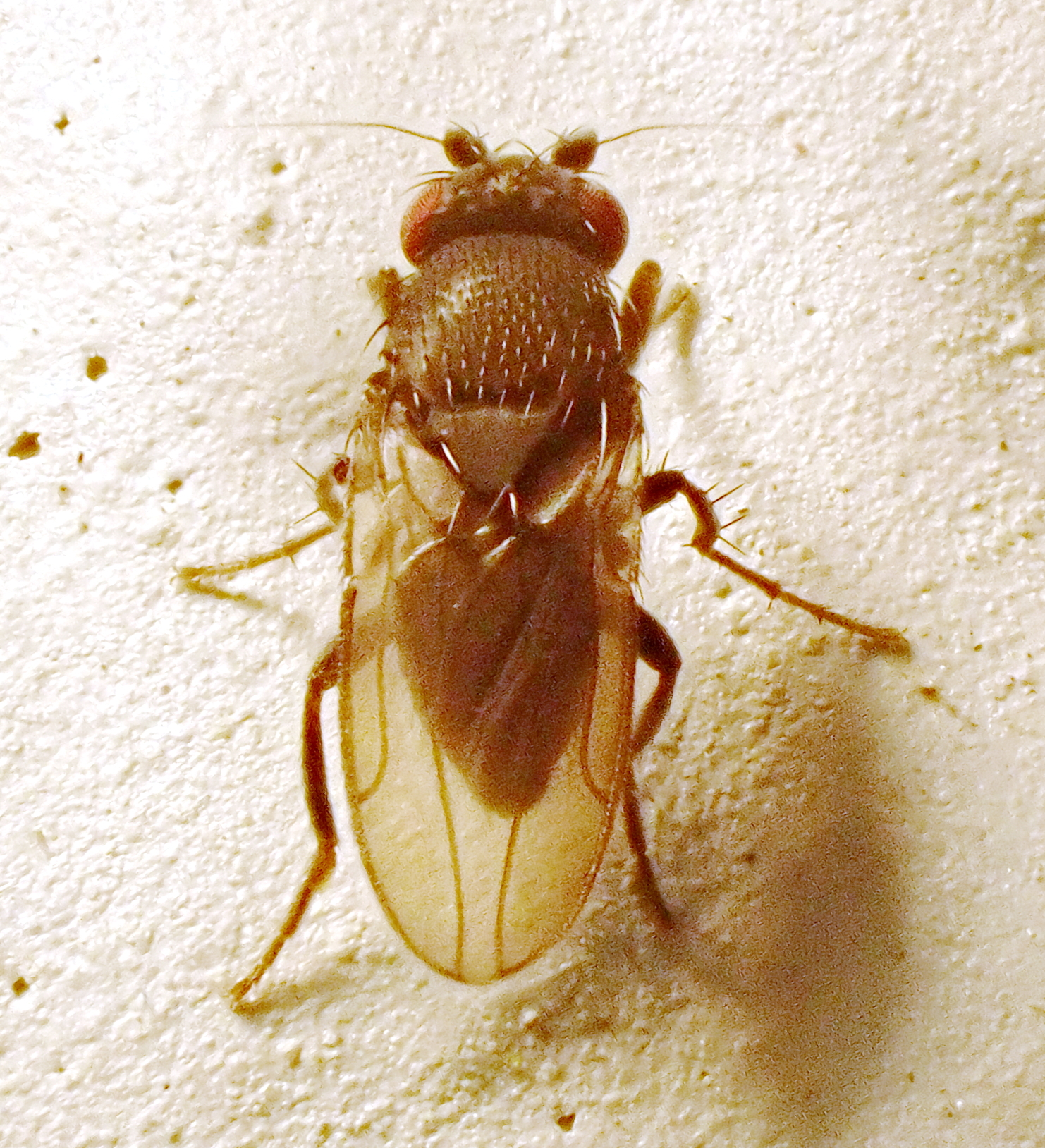

Scientific classification
- Kingdom: Animalia
- Phylum: Arthropoda
- Class: Insecta
- Order: Diptera
- Family: Sphaeroceridae
- Subfamily: Limosininae
- Genus: Sclerocoelus; Marshall, 1995

Type species
- Limosina sordipes Adams, 1904

= Sclerocoelus =

Genus of flies

Sclerocoelus is a genus of flies belonging to the lesser dung fly family Sphaeroceridae.

== Species ==
Species include:

- Sclerocoelus andensis Marshall, 1997
- Sclerocoelus brasilensis Marshall, 1997
- Sclerocoelus caribensis Marshall, 1997
- Sclerocoelus clarae (Papp, 1973)
- Sclerocoelus galapagensis Marshall, 1997
- Sclerocoelus hemorrhoidalis Marshall, 1997
- Sclerocoelus plumiseta (Duda, 1925)
- Sclerocoelus rectangularis (Malloch, 1914)
- Sclerocoelus regularis (Malloch, 1914)
- Sclerocoelus sordipes (Adams, 1904)
- Sclerocoelus subbrevipennis (Frey, 1954)
