= Hellerella =

Scientific classification
- Kingdom: Animalia
- Phylum: Arthropoda
- Class: Insecta
- Order: Diptera
- Family: Sphaeroceridae
- Subfamily: Limosininae
- Genus: Hellerella; Duda, 1920

Type species
- Archileptocera (Hellerella) decipiens Duda, 1920

Genus of flies

Hellerella is a genus of flies belonging to the family Sphaeroceridae, the lesser dung flies.

== Species ==
- H. decipiens (Duda, 1920)
