= Palaeocoprina =

Scientific classification
- Kingdom: Animalia
- Phylum: Arthropoda
- Class: Insecta
- Order: Diptera
- Family: Sphaeroceridae
- Subfamily: Limosininae
- Genus: Palaeocoprina; Duda, 1920

Type species
- Archileptocera (Palaeocoprina) geminiseta Duda, 1920

Genus of flies

Palaeocoprina is a genus of flies belonging to the family Sphaeroceridae.

== Species ==
- P. argentinensis Marshall, 1998
- P. colombiensis Marshall, 1998
- P. disticha (Becker, 1920)
- P. equiseta Marshall, 1998
- P. geminiseta (Duda, 1920)
- P. longinotum Marshall, 1998
- P. masneri Marshall, 1998
- P. pisinna Marshall, 1998
- P. quadriseta Marshall, 1998
