= Papualimosina =

Scientific classification
- Kingdom: Animalia
- Phylum: Arthropoda
- Class: Insecta
- Order: Diptera
- Family: Sphaeroceridae
- Subfamily: Limosininae
- Genus: Papualimosina; Hayashi, 2006

Type species
- Leptocera (Scotophilella) longidiscoidalis Duda, 1925

Genus of flies

Papualimosina is a genus of flies belonging to the family Sphaeroceridae.

== Species ==
- P. longidiscoidalis (Duda, 1925)
