= Druciatus =

Scientific classification
- Kingdom: Animalia
- Phylum: Arthropoda
- Class: Insecta
- Order: Diptera
- Family: Sphaeroceridae
- Subfamily: Limosininae
- Genus: Druciatus; Marshall, 1995

Type species
- Druciatus ovisternus Marshall, 1995

Genus of flies

Druciatus is a genus of flies belonging to the family Sphaeroceridae.

== Species ==
- D. angustus Marshall in Marshall & Totton, 1995
- D. campbelli Marshall in Marshall & Totton, 1995
- D. dissidens Marshall in Marshall & Totton, 1995
- D. latisternus Marshall in Marshall & Totton, 1995
- D. nigritarsus Marshall in Marshall & Totton, 1995
- D. ovisternus Marshall, 1995
- D. petilus Marshall in Marshall & Totton, 1995
- D. trisetus Marshall in Marshall & Totton, 1995
