= Papuella =

Scientific classification
- Kingdom: Animalia
- Phylum: Arthropoda
- Class: Insecta
- Order: Coleoptera
- Suborder: Polyphaga
- Infraorder: Cucujiformia
- Family: Anamorphidae
- Genus: Papuella; Strohecker, 1956

Genus of beetle

Papuella is a genus of beetle belonging to the family Anamorphidae. It has two species Papuella birolecta (Strohecker, 1956) and Papuella globosa ((Arrow, 1926)), which are native to New Guinea and Sumatra, respectively. A fly given the same genus name in 1973 was moved to the genus Papuellicesa in 2010.
