= Ocellusia =

Scientific classification
- Kingdom: Animalia
- Phylum: Arthropoda
- Class: Insecta
- Order: Diptera
- Family: Sphaeroceridae
- Subfamily: Limosininae
- Genus: Ocellusia; Séguy, 1955

Type species
- Ocellusia achroma Séguy, 1955

Genus of flies

Ocellusia is a genus of flies belonging to the family Sphaeroceridae.

== Species ==
- Ocellusia achroma Séguy, 1955
- Ocellusia jugorum Séguy, 1955
