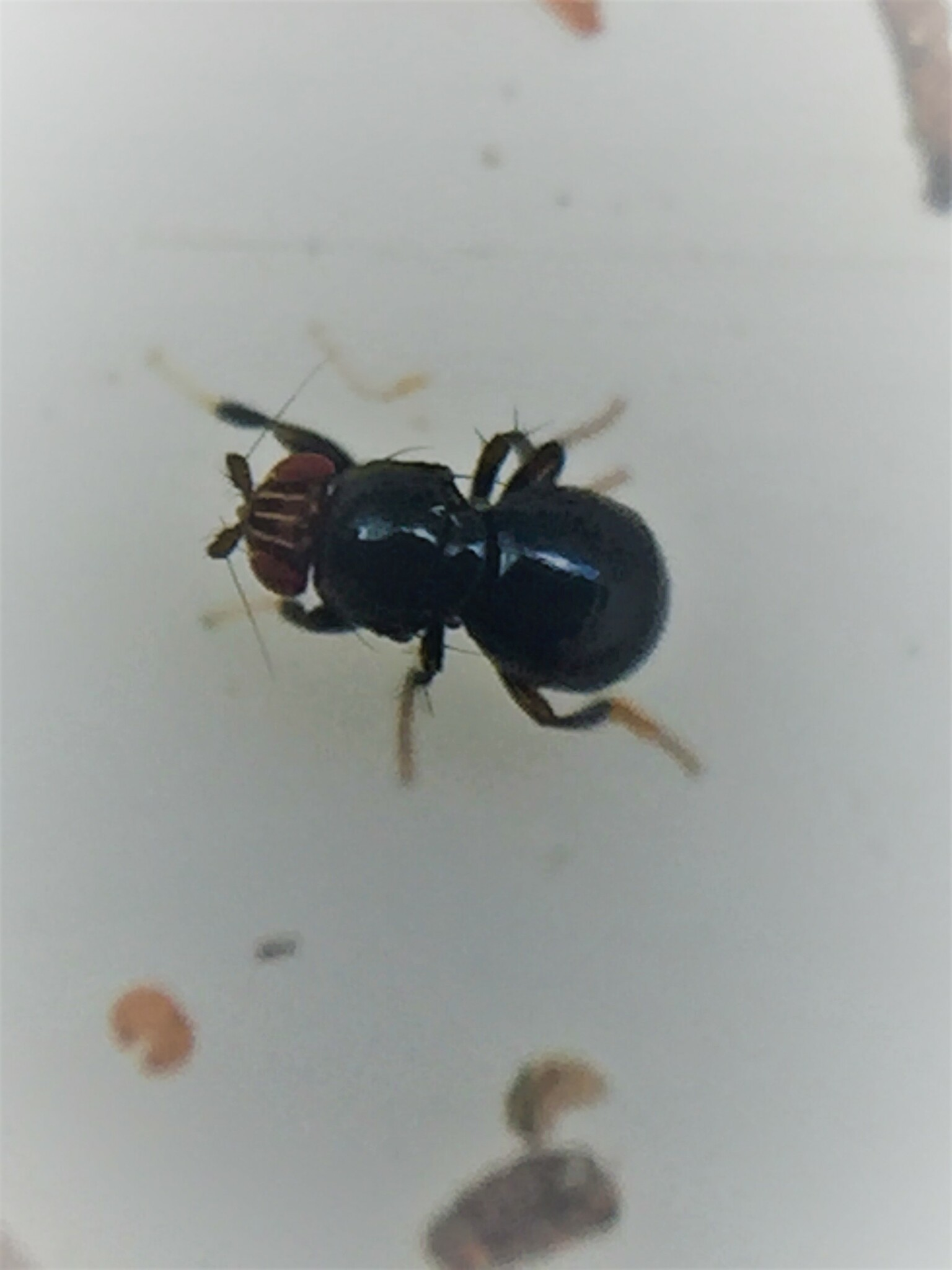
- Howickia trilineata, New Zealand

Scientific classification
- Kingdom: Animalia
- Phylum: Arthropoda
- Clade: Pancrustacea
- Class: Insecta
- Order: Diptera
- Family: Sphaeroceridae
- Subfamily: Limosininae
- Genus: Howickia; Richards, 1951

Type species
- Howickia trilineata (Hutton, 1901)

Synonyms
- Otawayia Richards, 1973; Australimosina Papp, 2008 [2]; Apterobiroina Papp, 1979 [1]; Bentrovata Richards, 1973; Biroina Richards, 1973; Monteithiana Richards, 1973; Otwayia Richards, 1973; Popondetta Richards, 1973

= Howickia =

Genus of flies

Howickia is a genus of lesser dung flies in the family Sphaeroceridae. There are more than 60 described species in Howickia, found in Australia and New Zealand.

Six genera have been synonymized with Howickia, which resulted in the species of Apterobiroina, Australimosina, Bentrovata, Monteithiana, Popondetta, and Otwayia being moved to this genus.

== Species ==
These 62 species belong to the genus Howickia:

- Howickia acicula Kuwahara & Marshall, 2022
- Howickia auricoma Kuwahara & Marshall, 2022
- Howickia australis (Papp, 1979)
- Howickia biantenna Kuwahara & Marshall, 2022
- Howickia bicolor Marshall, 2014
- Howickia brevior (Richards, 1973)
- Howickia capitalis (Richards, 1973)
- Howickia cordata Marshall, 2014
- Howickia cruspica Kuwahara & Marshall, 2022
- Howickia cynthia (Richards, 1973)
- Howickia dealata (Richards, 1973)
- Howickia dodo (Richards, 1973)
- Howickia erythrocephala Kuwahara & Marshall, 2022
- Howickia exasperata Marshall, 2014
- Howickia flagella Kuwahara & Marshall, 2022
- Howickia flavipes (Papp, 2021)
- Howickia flaviterga (Richards, 1973)
- Howickia flavithorax (Papp, 2021)
- Howickia fuscalis (Richards, 1973)
- Howickia grandisterna Kuwahara & Marshall, 2022
- Howickia hardyana (Richards, 1973)
- Howickia harrisoni Marshall, 2014
- Howickia hirsuta Kuwahara & Marshall, 2026
- Howickia holti Kuwahara & Marshall, 2022
- Howickia irwini Kuwahara & Marshall, 2022
- Howickia kukali Kuwahara & Marshall, 2026
- Howickia kurandensis (Richards, 1973)
- Howickia lepidostylus Marshall, 2014
- Howickia loligo Kuwahara & Marshall, 2022
- Howickia mecurialis Marshall, 2014
- Howickia mercurialis Marshall, 2014
- Howickia myersi (Richards, 1973)
- Howickia myrmecophila (Knab & Malloch, 1912)
- Howickia neoregalis Kuwahara & Marshall, 2022
- Howickia nigrilegula Marshall, 2014
- Howickia nigriventer Marshall, 2014
- Howickia nitidipleura (Richards, 1973)
- Howickia notechis Kuwahara & Marshall, 2022
- Howickia nuda Kuwahara & Marshall, 2022
- Howickia nudistylus Marshall, 2014
- Howickia oliveri Marshall, 2014
- Howickia omamari Marshall, 2014
- Howickia palmai Marshall, 2014
- Howickia percostata (Richards, 1973)
- Howickia pertusa Kuwahara & Marshall, 2022
- Howickia pinnula Kuwahara & Marshall, 2022
- Howickia pseudovittata Kuwahara & Marshall, 2022
- Howickia regalis (Richards, 1973)
- Howickia robustaseta Kuwahara & Marshall, 2022
- Howickia sabina (Richards, 1973)
- Howickia subsinuata (Richards, 1973)
- Howickia sumatrana Kuwahara & Marshall, 2026
- Howickia symmetrica (Richards, 1973)
- Howickia tangata Marshall, 2014
- Howickia tricolor Kuwahara & Marshall, 2022
- Howickia trilineata (Hutton, 1901)
- Howickia trivittata (Richards, 1973)
- Howickia truemani Kuwahara & Marshall, 2022
- Howickia trulliformis Kuwahara & Marshall, 2026
- Howickia truncata (Papp, 2021)
- Howickia vernalis (Richards, 1973)
- Howickia wahaika Marshall, 2014
- Howickia wamini Kuwahara & Marshall, 2022
- Howickia wilsoni (Richards, 1973)
- Howickia xanthocephala Kuwahara & Marshall, 2022
- Howickia zonula Marshall, 2014
