= Kabaria (fly) =

Scientific classification
- Kingdom: Animalia
- Phylum: Arthropoda
- Class: Insecta
- Order: Diptera
- Family: Sphaeroceridae
- Subfamily: Limosininae
- Genus: Kabaria; Richards, 1966
- Species: K. Kabaria

Binomial name
- Kabaria Kabaria Richards, 1966

Genus of flies

Kabaria is a genus of lesser dung flies in the family Sphaeroceridae. This genus has a single species, Kabaria spinisterna.
