= Pismira =

Scientific classification
- Kingdom: Animalia
- Phylum: Arthropoda
- Class: Insecta
- Order: Diptera
- Family: Sphaeroceridae
- Subfamily: Limosininae
- Genus: Pismira; Richards, 1960

Type species
- Pismira citrago Richards, 1960

Synonyms
- Pismara Pitkin, 1989

Genus of flies

Pismira is a genus of flies belonging to the family Sphaeroceridae.

== Species ==
- Pismira citrago Richards, 1960
- Pismira kabare Richards, 1960
- Pismira mwenga Richards, 1960
- Pismira uvira Richards, 1960
