= Myrmolimosina =

Scientific classification
- Kingdom: Animalia
- Phylum: Arthropoda
- Class: Insecta
- Order: Diptera
- Family: Sphaeroceridae
- Subfamily: Limosininae
- Genus: Myrmolimosina; Marshall, 2000

Type species
- Myrmolimosina andersoni Marshall, 2000

Genus of flies

Myrmolimosina is a genus of flies belonging to the family Sphaeroceridae.

== Species ==
- Myrmolimosina andersoni Marshall, 2000
