= Apteromyia =

Scientific classification
- Kingdom: Animalia
- Phylum: Arthropoda
- Class: Insecta
- Order: Diptera
- Family: Sphaeroceridae
- Subfamily: Limosininae
- Genus: Apteromyia; Vimmer, 1929

Type species
- Apteromyia Všetečkai Vimmer, 1929

Synonyms
- Aptilomyia Vimmer, 1929; Všetečkiella Vimmer, 1931

Genus of flies

Apteromyia is a genus of flies belonging to the family Sphaeroceridae.

== Species ==
- Apteromyia claviventris (Strobl, 1909)
- Apteromyia newtoni Marshall & Roháček, 1982
