= Indiosina =

Scientific classification
- Kingdom: Animalia
- Phylum: Arthropoda
- Class: Insecta
- Order: Diptera
- Family: Sphaeroceridae
- Subfamily: Limosininae
- Genus: Indiosina; Papp, 1981

Type species
- Indiosina loebli Papp, 1981

Genus of flies

Indiosina is a genus of flies belonging to the family Sphaeroceridae.

== Species ==
- Indiosina loebli Papp, 1981
