= Pachytarsella =

Scientific classification
- Kingdom: Animalia
- Phylum: Arthropoda
- Class: Insecta
- Order: Diptera
- Family: Sphaeroceridae
- Subfamily: Limosininae
- Genus: Pachytarsella; Richards, 1963

Type species
- Leptocera pachypus Richards, 1956

Genus of flies

Pachytarsella is a genus of flies belonging to the family Sphaeroceridae.

== Species ==
- Pachytarsella boharti (Richards, 1963)
- Pachytarsella pachypus (Richards, 1956)
