= Frutillaria =

Scientific classification
- Kingdom: Animalia
- Phylum: Arthropoda
- Class: Insecta
- Order: Diptera
- Family: Sphaeroceridae
- Subfamily: Copromyzinae
- Genus: Frutillaria; Richards, 1961

Type species
- Frutillaria kuscheli Richards, 1961

Genus of flies

Frutillaria is a genus of flies belonging to the family Sphaeroceridae.

== Species ==
- F. abdita Kits & Marshall, 2011
- F. anticura Kits & Marshall, 2011
- F. calceata Richards, 1961
- F. calida Kits & Marshall, 2011
- F. cheupuensis Richards, 1961
- F. chiloensis Kits & Marshall, 2011
- F. contulmo Kits & Marshall, 2011
- F. edenensis Richards, 1961
- F. furcata Kits & Marshall, 2011
- F. glabra Kits & Marshall, 2011
- F. kuscheli Richards, 1961
- F. propinqua Richards, 1964
- F. richardsi Kits & Marshall, 2011
- F. stenoptera Richards, 1961
- F. tenuiforceps Richards, 1964
- F. transversa Kits & Marshall, 2011
- F. triangularis Richards, 1964
