= Anomioptera =

Scientific classification
- Kingdom: Animalia
- Phylum: Arthropoda
- Class: Insecta
- Order: Diptera
- Family: Sphaeroceridae
- Subfamily: Limosininae
- Genus: Anomioptera; Schiner, 1868

Type species
- Anomioptera picta Schiner, 1868

Synonyms
- Neopoecilosomella Deeming, 1966

Genus of flies

Anomioptera is a genus of flies belonging to the family Sphaeroceridae.

== Species ==
- Anomioptera bialba Marshall, 1998
- Anomioptera picta Schiner, 1868
- Anomioptera plaumanni Deeming, 1966
- Anomioptera quadrialba Marshall, 1998
- Anomioptera quinquealba Marshall, 1998
- Anomioptera tresalba Marshall, 1998
