= Mesaptilotus =

Scientific classification
- Kingdom: Animalia
- Phylum: Arthropoda
- Class: Insecta
- Order: Diptera
- Family: Sphaeroceridae
- Subfamily: Limosininae
- Genus: Mesaptilotus; Richards, 1951

Type species
- Mesaptilotus pollinosus Richards, 1951

Genus of flies

Mesaptilotus is a genus of flies belonging to the family Sphaeroceridae.

== Species ==
- M. ancoralis Richards, 1963
- M. belemnus Richards, 1963
- M. bihamatus Richards, 1963
- M. disjunctus Richards, 1965
- M. flavitarsis Richards, 1963
- M. hamatus Richards, 1963
- M. laminatus Richards, 1963
- M. minimus Richards, 1963
- M. ochritarsis Richards, 1963
- M. pollinosus Richards, 1951
- M. setitibia Richards, 1963
- M. tibiellus Richards, 1963
- M. tumidus Richards, 1963
- M. vittifrons Richards, 1955
