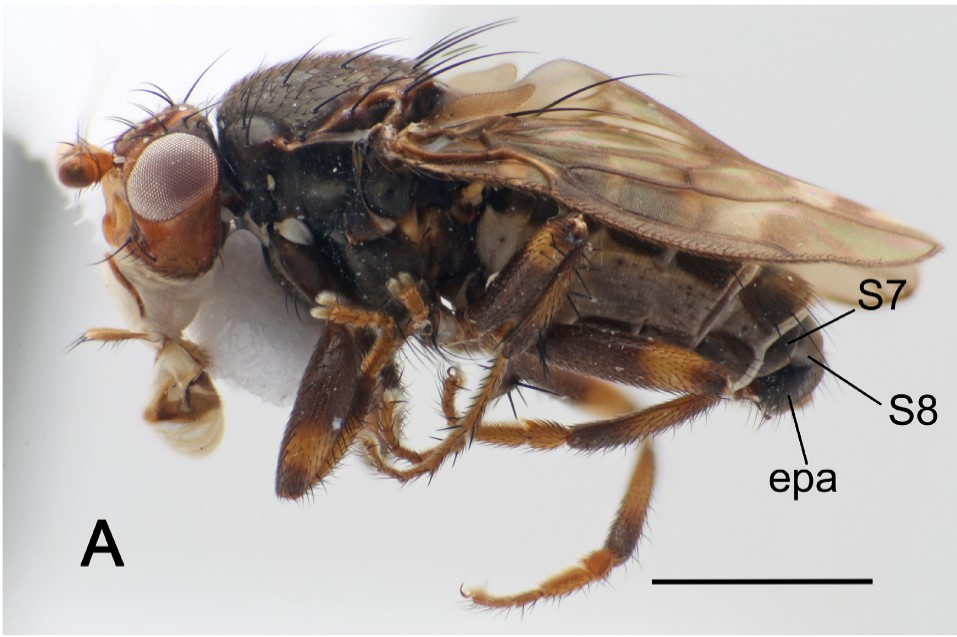
- Pleuroseta wentworthi

Scientific classification
- Kingdom: Animalia
- Phylum: Arthropoda
- Class: Insecta
- Order: Diptera
- Family: Sphaeroceridae
- Subfamily: Limosininae
- Genus: Pleuroseta; Richards, 1973

Type species
- Leptocera (Pleuroseta) wentworthi Richards, 1973

= Pleuroseta =

Genus of flies

Pleuroseta is a genus of flies belonging to the family Sphaeroceridae.

== Species ==
- Pleuroseta wentworthi (Richards, 1973)
