= Bromeloecia =

Scientific classification
- Kingdom: Animalia
- Phylum: Arthropoda
- Class: Insecta
- Order: Diptera
- Family: Sphaeroceridae
- Subfamily: Limosininae
- Genus: Bromeloecia; Spuler, 1924

Type species
- Limosina bromeliarum Knab & Malloch, 1912

Synonyms
- Bromoloecia Richards, 1930

Genus of flies

Bromeloecia is a genus of flies belonging to the family Sphaeroceridae.

== Species ==
- Bromeloecia bromeliarum (Knab & Malloch, 1912)
- Bromeloecia seltzeri Marshall, 1983
- Bromeloecia tarsiglossa Marshall, 1983
- Bromeloecia winnemana (Malloch, 1925)
