= Paramera =

Scientific classification
- Kingdom: Animalia
- Phylum: Arthropoda
- Class: Insecta
- Order: Diptera
- Family: Sphaeroceridae
- Subfamily: Limosininae
- Genus: Paramera; Papp, 2008

Type species
- Paramera robusta Papp, 2008

Genus of flies

Paramera is a genus of flies belonging to the family Sphaeroceridae.

== Species ==
- Paramera ornata Papp, 2008
- Paramera robusta Papp, 2008
