= Aluligera =

Scientific classification
- Kingdom: Animalia
- Phylum: Arthropoda
- Class: Insecta
- Order: Diptera
- Family: Sphaeroceridae
- Subfamily: Limosininae
- Genus: Aluligera; Richards, 1951

Type species
- Aluligera montana Richards, 1951

Synonyms
- Uluguria Richards, 1965

Genus of flies

Aluligera is a genus of flies belonging to the family Sphaeroceridae.

== Species ==
- A. alpina Richards, 1966
- A. bicolor (Richards, 1965)
- A. brunneata Richards, 1966
- A. flavena (Richards, 1966)
- A. grossa Richards, 1955
- A. grossula Richards, 1966
- A. ituriensis Richards, 1966
- A. laqueata Richards, 1966
- A. leucocephala Richards, 1966
- A. leucothorax Richards, 1966
- A. maculata (Richards, 1965)
- A. montana Richards, 1951
- A. nigra (Richards, 1965)
- A. pallidisternum Richards, 1966
- A. polychaeta Richards, 1966
- A. sessilis Richards, 1966
- A. stenosoma Richards, 1955
- A. varicolor (Richards, 1957)
- A. vittigera (Richards, 1980)
- A. xanthographa (Richards, 1959)
