= Pseudopterogramma =

Scientific classification
- Kingdom: Animalia
- Phylum: Arthropoda
- Class: Insecta
- Order: Diptera
- Family: Sphaeroceridae
- Subfamily: Limosininae
- Genus: Pseudopterogramma; Papp, 2008

Type species
- Pseudopterogramma siamensis Papp, 2008

Synonyms
- Archipterogrammoides Papp, 2008

Genus of flies

Pseudopterogramma is a genus of flies belonging to the family Sphaeroceridae.

== Species ==
- Pseudopterogramma annectens (Richards, 1964)
- Pseudopterogramma brevivenosum (Tenorio, 1967)
- Pseudopterogramma conicum (Richards, 1946)
- Pseudopterogramma siamensis Papp, 2008
- Pseudopterogramma insulare (Papp, 1972)
