= Anommonia =

Scientific classification
- Kingdom: Animalia
- Phylum: Arthropoda
- Class: Insecta
- Order: Diptera
- Family: Sphaeroceridae
- Subfamily: Limosininae
- Genus: Anommonia; Schmitz, 1917

Type species
- Anommonia appendicigera Schmitz, 1917

Synonyms
- Ammonia Vanschuytbroeck, 1959

Genus of flies

Anommonia is a genus of flies belonging to the family Sphaeroceridae.

== Species ==
- Anommonia alopecialis (Richards, 1968)
- Anommonia appendicigera Schmitz, 1917
- Anommonia flavicaput (Richards, 1968)
- Anommonia nudipes Richards, 1950
- Anommonia patrizii (Richards, 1950)
- Anommonia schwabi Schmitz, 1917
- Anommonia spinipleura (Richards, 1968)
