= Archiceroptera =

Scientific classification
- Kingdom: Animalia
- Phylum: Arthropoda
- Class: Insecta
- Order: Diptera
- Family: Sphaeroceridae
- Subfamily: Limosininae
- Genus: Archiceroptera; Papp, 1977

Type species
- Archiceroptera mahunkai Papp, 1977

Genus of flies

Archiceroptera is a genus of flies belonging to the family Sphaeroceridae.

== Species ==
- Archiceroptera mahunkai Papp, 1977
- Archiceroptera venezolana (Richards, 1963)
