= Richardsia =

Scientific classification
- Kingdom: Animalia
- Phylum: Arthropoda
- Class: Insecta
- Order: Diptera
- Family: Sphaeroceridae
- Subfamily: Copromyzinae
- Genus: Richardsia; Papp, 1973

Type species
- Copromyza mongolica Papp, 1973

Genus of flies

Richardsia is a genus of flies belonging to the family Sphaeroceridae.

== Species ==
- Richardsia mongolica Papp, 1973 Mongolia
