= Immoderatus =

Scientific classification
- Kingdom: Animalia
- Phylum: Arthropoda
- Clade: Pancrustacea
- Class: Insecta
- Order: Diptera
- Family: Sphaeroceridae
- Subfamily: Copromyzinae
- Genus: Immoderatus; Papp, 2004

Type species
- Immoderatus foldvarii Papp, 2004

Genus of flies

Immoderatus is a genus of flies belonging to the family Sphaeroceridae.

== Species ==
- Immoderatus foldvarii Papp, 2004 - Thailand
