= Paralimosina =

Scientific classification
- Kingdom: Animalia
- Phylum: Arthropoda
- Class: Insecta
- Order: Diptera
- Family: Sphaeroceridae
- Subfamily: Limosininae
- Genus: Paralimosina; Papp, 1973

Type species
- Paralimosina kaszabi Papp, 1973

Synonyms
- Hackmaniella Papp, 1979; Nipponsina (Papp, 1982)

Genus of flies

Paralimosina is a genus of flies belonging to the family Sphaeroceridae.

== Species ==
- P. acris Roháček & Papp, 1988
- P. albipes Hayashi, 1994
- P. altimontana (Roháček, 1977)
- P. atrimarginata Hayashi, 2008
- P. biloba Hayashi, 1994
- P. bracteata Roháček & Papp, 1988
- P. brevis Roháček & Papp, 1988
- P. cavata Hayashi, 1994
- P. ceylanica (Papp, 1979)
- P. choochotei Hayashi, 2008
- P. confusa Hayashi, 1994
- P. dimorpha Roháček & Papp, 1988
- P. fucata (Rondani, 1880)
- P. gigantea Roháček & Papp, 1988
- P. hamata Hayashi, 2008
- P. icaros Roháček & Papp, 1988
- P. indica Roháček & Papp, 1988
- P. japonica Hayashi, 1985
- P. kaszabi Papp, 1973
- P. kinabalensis Hayashi, 2007
- P. lobata Roháček & Papp, 1988
- P. longitricha Hayashi, 2008
- P. macedonica (Roháček, 1977)
- P. maculipennis Hayashi, 2008
- P. marshalli Roháček & Papp, 1988
- P. megaloba Hayashi, 1994
- P. minor Roháček & Papp, 1988
- P. pallens Hayashi, 2008
- P. persimilis Hayashi, 2008
- P. prominens Hayashi, 1985
- P. sexsetosa (Papp, 1982)
- P. similis Hayashi, 1994
- P. subcribrata (Roháček, 1977)
- P. trichopyga (Richards, 1952
- P. undulata Hayashi, 2008
