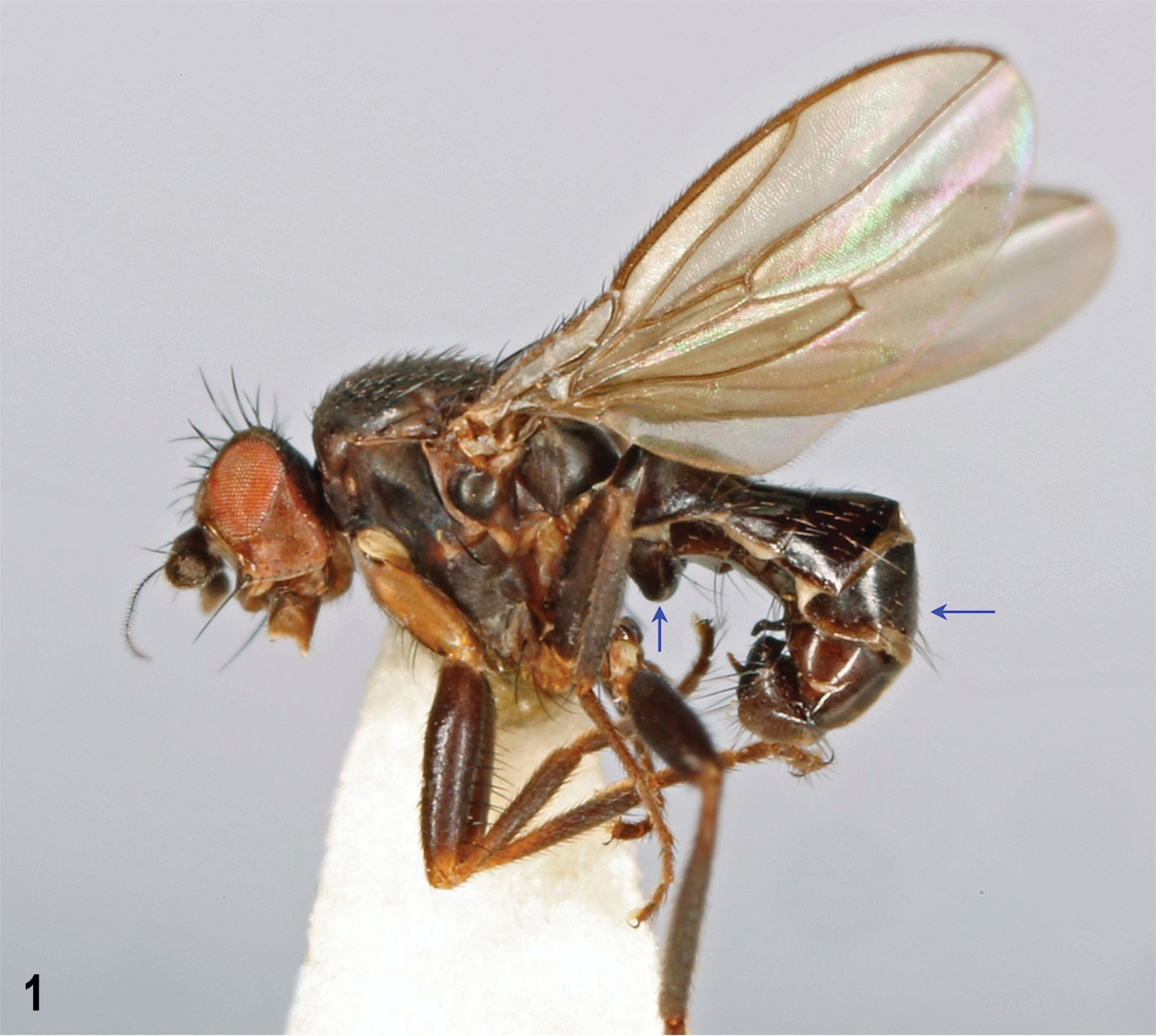

Scientific classification
- Kingdom: Animalia
- Phylum: Arthropoda
- Class: Insecta
- Order: Diptera
- Family: Sphaeroceridae
- Subfamily: Limosininae
- Genus: Herniosina; Roháček, 1983

Type species
- Herniosina bequaerti Villeneuve, 1917

Synonyms
- Herniosina Roháček, 1982

= Herniosina =

Genus of flies

Herniosina is a genus of flies belonging to the family Sphaeroceridae.

== Species ==
- H. bequaerti (Villeneuve, 1917)
- H. calabra Roháček, 2021
- H. erymantha Roháček, 2016
- H. hamata Roháček, 2016
- H. horrida (Roháček, 1978)
- H. pollex Roháček, 1993
- H. voluminosa Marshall, 1987
