= Pterogrammoides =

Scientific classification
- Kingdom: Animalia
- Phylum: Arthropoda
- Class: Insecta
- Order: Diptera
- Family: Sphaeroceridae
- Subfamily: Limosininae
- Genus: Pterogrammoides; Papp, 1972

Type species
- Pterogrammoides baloghi Papp, 1972

Genus of flies

Pterogrammoides is a genus of flies belonging to the family Sphaeroceridae.

== Species ==
- Pterogrammoides baloghi Papp, 1972
- Pterogrammoides indicus Papp, 1989
- Pterogrammoides longipennis Papp, 1972
- Pterogrammoides poecilosomus Papp, 1972
- Pterogrammoides thaii Papp, 1989
