= Aspinilimosina =

Scientific classification
- Kingdom: Animalia
- Phylum: Arthropoda
- Clade: Pancrustacea
- Class: Insecta
- Order: Diptera
- Family: Sphaeroceridae
- Subfamily: Limosininae
- Genus: Aspinilimosina; Papp, 2004

Type species
- Aspinilimosina postocellaris Papp, 2004

Genus of flies

Aspinilimosina is a genus of flies belonging to the family Sphaeroceridae.

== Species ==
- A. postocellaris Papp, 2004
