= Reunionia =

Scientific classification
- Kingdom: Animalia
- Phylum: Arthropoda
- Class: Insecta
- Order: Diptera
- Family: Sphaeroceridae
- Subfamily: Limosininae
- Genus: Reunionia; Papp, 1979

Type species
- Reunionia unica Papp, 1979

Genus of flies

Reunionia is a genus of flies belonging to the family of the Sphaeroceridae.

== Species ==
- Reunionia unica Papp, 1979
