= Siphlopteryx =

Scientific classification
- Kingdom: Animalia
- Phylum: Arthropoda
- Clade: Pancrustacea
- Class: Insecta
- Order: Diptera
- Family: Sphaeroceridae
- Subfamily: Limosininae
- Genus: Siphlopteryx; Enderlein, 1908
- Species: S. antarctica

Binomial name
- Siphlopteryx antarctica Enderlein, 1908

Genus of flies

Siphlopteryx is a genus of flies belonging to the family Sphaeroceridae. It contains one species, Siphlopteryx antarctica.
