= Lepidosina =

Scientific classification
- Kingdom: Animalia
- Phylum: Arthropoda
- Class: Insecta
- Order: Diptera
- Family: Sphaeroceridae
- Subfamily: Limosininae
- Genus: Lepidosina; Marshall & Buck, 2007

Type species
- Leptocera (Scotophilella) gibba Spuler, 1925

Genus of flies

Lepidosina is a genus of flies belonging to the family Sphaeroceridae.

== Species ==
- Lepidosina angusticercus Marshall & Buck, 2007
- Lepidosina argentinensis Marshall & Buck, 2007
- Lepidosina cubensis Marshall & Buck, 2007
- Lepidosina evanescens Marshall & Buck, 2007
- Lepidosina gibba (Spuler, 1925)
- Lepidosina inaequalis (Malloch, 1914)
- Lepidosina multispinulosa Marshall & Buck, 2007
- Lepidosina platessa Marshall & Buck, 2007
- Lepidosina proxineura Marshall & Buck, 2007
- Lepidosina quadrisquamosa Marshall & Buck, 2007
- Lepidosina rutricauda Marshall & Buck, 2007
