= Oribatomyia =

Scientific classification
- Kingdom: Animalia
- Phylum: Arthropoda
- Class: Insecta
- Order: Diptera
- Family: Sphaeroceridae
- Subfamily: Limosininae
- Genus: Oribatomyia; Richards, 1960

Type species
- Oribatomyia flavicans Richards, 1960

Genus of flies

Oribatomyia is a genus of flies belonging to the family Sphaeroceridae.

== Species ==
- Oribatomyia flaveola Richards, 1960
- Oribatomyia flavicans Richards, 1960
