= Giraffimyiella =

Scientific classification
- Kingdom: Animalia
- Phylum: Arthropoda
- Class: Insecta
- Order: Diptera
- Family: Sphaeroceridae
- Subfamily: Limosininae
- Genus: Giraffimyiella; Papp, 2008

Type species
- Leptocera (Poecilosomella) giraffa Richards, 1938

Genus of flies

Giraffimyiella is a genus of flies belonging to the family Sphaeroceridae.

== Species ==
- Giraffimyiella giraffa (Richards, 1938)
