= Limosinella =

Scientific classification
- Kingdom: Animalia
- Phylum: Arthropoda
- Class: Insecta
- Order: Diptera
- Family: Sphaeroceridae
- Subfamily: Limosininae
- Genus: Limosinella; Richards, 1951

Type species
- Limosinella polita Richards, 1951

Genus of flies

Limosinella is a genus of flies belonging to the family Sphaeroceridae.

== Species ==
- Limosinella munda (Collin, 1912)
