= Philocoprella =

Scientific classification
- Kingdom: Animalia
- Phylum: Arthropoda
- Class: Insecta
- Order: Diptera
- Family: Sphaeroceridae
- Subfamily: Limosininae
- Genus: Philocoprella; Richards, 1929

Type species
- Leptocera (Philocoprella) arvernica Richards, 1929

Genus of flies

Philocoprella is a genus of flies belonging to the family Sphaeroceridae.

== Species ==
- Philocoprella arvernica (Richards, 1929)
- Philocoprella italica (Deeming, 1964)
- Philocoprella mongolica Papp, 1973
- Philocoprella quadrispina (Laurence, 1952)
- Philocoprella rectiradiata Papp, 1973
