= Gigalimosina =

Scientific classification
- Kingdom: Animalia
- Phylum: Arthropoda
- Class: Insecta
- Order: Diptera
- Family: Sphaeroceridae
- Subfamily: Limosininae
- Genus: Gigalimosina; Roháček, 1983

Type species
- Limosina flaviceps Zetterstedt, 1847

Synonyms
- Gigalimosina Roháček, 1982

Genus of flies

Gigalimosina is a genus of flies belonging to the family Sphaeroceridae.

== Species ==
- Gigalimosina flaviceps (Zetterstedt, 1847)
