= Anatalanta =

Scientific classification
- Kingdom: Animalia
- Phylum: Arthropoda
- Class: Insecta
- Order: Diptera
- Family: Sphaeroceridae
- Subfamily: Limosininae
- Genus: Anatalanta; Eaton, 1875

Type species
- Anatalanta aptera Eaton, 1875

Synonyms
- Dreuxiella Matile, 1975

Genus of flies

Anatalanta is a genus of Subantarctic flies belonging to the family Sphaeroceridae.

== Species ==
- Anatalanta aptera Eaton, 1875
- Anatalanta crozetensis Enderlein, 1908
