= Nearcticorpus =

Scientific classification
- Kingdom: Animalia
- Phylum: Arthropoda
- Class: Insecta
- Order: Diptera
- Family: Sphaeroceridae
- Subfamily: Limosininae
- Genus: Nearcticorpus; Roháček & Marshall, 1982

Type species
- Nearcticorpus canadense Roháček & Marshall, 1982

Genus of flies

Nearcticorpus is a genus of flies belonging to the family Sphaeroceridae.

== Species ==
- Nearcticorpus canadense Roháček & Marshall, 1982
- Nearcticorpus pecki Roháček & Marshall, 1982
