= Biconnecta =

Scientific classification
- Kingdom: Animalia
- Phylum: Arthropoda
- Class: Insecta
- Order: Diptera
- Family: Sphaeroceridae
- Subfamily: Limosininae
- Genus: Biconnecta; Papp, 2008

Type species
- Biconnecta mirabilis Papp, 2008

Genus of flies

Biconnecta is a genus of flies belonging to the family Sphaeroceridae.

== Species ==
- Biconnecta mirabilis Papp, 2008
