= Trisetomyia =

Scientific classification
- Kingdom: Animalia
- Phylum: Arthropoda
- Class: Insecta
- Order: Diptera
- Family: Sphaeroceridae
- Subfamily: Limosininae
- Genus: Trisetomyia; Richards, 1965

Type species
- Binorbitalia triseta Richards, 1954

Genus of flies

Trisetomyia is a genus of flies belonging to the family Sphaeroceridae.

== Species ==
- Trisetomyia triseta (Richards, 1954)
