= Papuellicesa =

Scientific classification
- Kingdom: Animalia
- Phylum: Arthropoda
- Class: Insecta
- Order: Diptera
- Family: Sphaeroceridae
- Subfamily: Limosininae
- Genus: Papuellicesa; Koçak & Kemal, 2010

Type species
- Leptocera (Papuella) scrobifera Richards, 1973

Synonyms
- Papuella Richards, 1973

Genus of flies

Papuellicesa is a genus of flies belonging to the family Sphaeroceridae . it contains a single species, Papuellicesa scrobifera, which is native to New Guinea. It was formerly named Papuella, but this was a junior homonym of a genus of beetle.

== Species ==
- Papuellicesa scrobifera (Richards, 1973)
