= Gobersa =

Scientific classification
- Kingdom: Animalia
- Phylum: Arthropoda
- Class: Insecta
- Order: Diptera
- Family: Sphaeroceridae
- Subfamily: Limosininae
- Genus: Gobersa de Coninck, 1983

Type species
- Gobersa leleupi de Coninck, 1983

Genus of flies

Gobersa is a genus of flies belonging to the family Sphaeroceridae.

== Species ==
- Gobersa leleupi de Coninck, 1983
