= Parapterogramma =

Scientific classification
- Kingdom: Animalia
- Phylum: Arthropoda
- Class: Insecta
- Order: Diptera
- Family: Sphaeroceridae
- Subfamily: Limosininae
- Genus: Parapterogramma; Papp, 2008

Type species
- Parapterogramma asiaticum Papp, 2008

Synonyms
- Minialula Papp, 2008

Genus of flies

Parapterogramma is a genus of flies belonging to the family Sphaeroceridae.

== Selected species ==
- Parapterogramma asiaticum Papp, 2008
