= Paraptilotus =

Scientific classification
- Kingdom: Animalia
- Phylum: Arthropoda
- Class: Insecta
- Order: Diptera
- Family: Sphaeroceridae
- Subfamily: Limosininae
- Genus: Paraptilotus; Richards, 1938

Type species
- Paraptilotus chaetosoma Richards, 1938

Synonyms
- Binorbitalia Richards, 1951

Genus of flies

Paraptilotus is a genus of flies belonging to the family Sphaeroceridae.

== Species ==
- Paraptilotus brunneisternum Richards, 1938
- Paraptilotus chaetosoma Richards, 1938
- Paraptilotus discontinuus (Richards, 1954)
- Paraptilotus flavipes Richards, 1938
- Paraptilotus nitidissimus (Richards, 1951)
- Paraptilotus pallidus Richards, 1965
- Paraptilotus rufescens Richards, 1965
- Paraptilotus senecionis Richards, 1957
- Paraptilotus tricolor Richards, 1965
