= Ocellipsis =

Scientific classification
- Kingdom: Animalia
- Phylum: Arthropoda
- Class: Insecta
- Order: Diptera
- Family: Sphaeroceridae
- Subfamily: Limosininae
- Genus: Ocellipsis; Richards, 1938

Type species
- Ocellipsis cyclogaster Richards, 1938

Genus of flies

Ocellipsis is a genus of flies belonging to the family Sphaeroceridae.

== Species ==
- O. alutacea Richards, 1938
- O. brunneicauda Richards, 1965
- O. cyclogaster Richards, 1938
- O. elgonensis Richards, 1957
- O. humeralis Richards, 1965
- O. jeanneli Richards, 1938
- O. leleupi Richards, 1957
- O. lonchomma Richards, 1938
- O. melanocephala Richards, 1938
- O. selaginella Richards, 1965
- O. spinata Richards, 1957
- O. verruciger Richards, 1938
