= Eulimosina =

Scientific classification
- Kingdom: Animalia
- Phylum: Arthropoda
- Class: Insecta
- Order: Diptera
- Family: Sphaeroceridae
- Subfamily: Limosininae
- Genus: Eulimosina; Roháček, 1983

Type species
- Borborus ochripes Meigen 1930

Genus of flies

Eulimosina is a genus of flies belonging to the family Sphaeroceridae.

== Species ==
- Eulimosina ochripes (Meigen, 1830)
- Eulimosina dudai (Papp, 1978)
- Eulimosina oroszi Papp, 2008
