= Ceropterella =

Scientific classification
- Kingdom: Animalia
- Phylum: Arthropoda
- Clade: Pancrustacea
- Class: Insecta
- Order: Diptera
- Family: Sphaeroceridae
- Subfamily: Limosininae
- Genus: Ceropterella; Richards, 1953

Type species
- Ceroptera (Ceropterella) nitidosa Richards, 1953

Genus of flies

Ceropterella is a genus of flies belonging to the family Sphaeroceridae.

== Species ==
- C. nitidosa (Richards, 1953)
