= Pycnopota =

Scientific classification
- Kingdom: Animalia
- Phylum: Arthropoda
- Clade: Pancrustacea
- Class: Insecta
- Order: Diptera
- Family: Sphaeroceridae
- Subfamily: Copromyzinae
- Genus: Pycnopota; Bezzi, 1927

Type species
- Pycnopota manni Bezzi, 1927

Genus of flies

Pycnopota is a genus of flies belonging to the family Sphaeroceridae.

== Species ==
- Pycnopota manni Bezzi, 1927 Bolivia
