= Xenolimosina =

Scientific classification
- Kingdom: Animalia
- Phylum: Arthropoda
- Class: Insecta
- Order: Diptera
- Family: Sphaeroceridae
- Subfamily: Limosininae
- Genus: Xenolimosina; Roháček, 1983

Type species
- Limosina (Leptocera) setaria Villeneuve, 1918

Synonyms
- Xenolimosina Roháček, 1982

Genus of flies

Xenolimosina is a genus of flies belonging to the family of the Sphaeroceridae.

== Species ==
- Xenolimosina glabrigena Marshall, 1999
- †Xenolimosina palaeospinosa Marshall in Marshall, Langstaff & Grimaldi, 1999
- Xenolimosina phoba Marshall, 1985
- Xenolimosina setaria (Villeneuve, 1918)
- Xenolimosina sicula Marshall, 1985
