= Lobeliomyia =

Scientific classification
- Kingdom: Animalia
- Phylum: Arthropoda
- Class: Insecta
- Order: Diptera
- Family: Sphaeroceridae
- Subfamily: Limosininae
- Genus: Lobeliomyia; Richards, 1951

Type species
- Lobeliomyia scotti Richards, 1951

Genus of flies

Lobeliomyia is a genus of flies belonging to the family Sphaeroceridae.

== Species ==
- Lobeliomyia scotti Richards, 1951
