= Chespiritos =

Scientific classification
- Kingdom: Animalia
- Phylum: Arthropoda
- Class: Insecta
- Order: Diptera
- Family: Sphaeroceridae
- Subfamily: Limosininae
- Genus: Chespiritos; Marshall, 2000

Type species
- Chespiritos sindecimus Marshall, 2000

Genus of flies

Chespiritos is a genus of flies of mostly neotropical distribution, belonging to the family Sphaeroceridae.

== Species ==
- C. anguineus Kuwahara & Marshall, 2020 (Bolivia)
- C. attenboroughi Kuwahara & Marshall, 2020 (Argentina; named after David Attenborough)
- C. balrogiformis Kuwahara & Marshall, 2020 (Peru; named after Balrogs)
- C. bolanosi Kuwahara & Marshall, 2020 (Mexico; named after Roberto Gómez Bolaños)
- C. calceus Kuwahara & Marshall, 2020 (Peru)
- C. chicobrazos Kuwahara & Marshall, 2020 (Costa Rica)
- C. coronatus Kuwahara & Marshall, 2020 (Bolivia, Brazil, Colombia, Costa Rica, Ecuador, Trinidad)
- C. dolabratus Kuwahara & Marshall, 2020 (Costa Rica)
- C. elephantus Kuwahara & Marshall, 2020 (Ecuador, Peru)
- C. extendido Kuwahara & Marshall, 2020 (Bolivia, Colombia, Costa Rica, Ecuador, Mexico, Panama, Venezuela)
- C. ganchopico Kuwahara & Marshall, 2020 (Argentina, Bolivia, Ecuador, Panama, Tobago)
- C. gladiator Kuwahara & Marshall, 2020 (Costa Rica)
- C. hojagrande Kuwahara & Marshall, 2020 (Costa Rica, Mexico)
- C. jamaicensis Kuwahara & Marshall, 2020 (Jamaica)
- C. lepustergum Kuwahara & Marshall, 2020 (Costa Rica, Venezuela)
- C. metroidiformis Kuwahara & Marshall, 2020 (Costa Rica; named after Metroids)
- C. paraiso Kuwahara & Marshall, 2020 (Dominican Republic)
- C. peckorum Kuwahara & Marshall, 2020 (Ecuador)
- C. pervadens Roháček & Buck, 2003 (Brazil and the Canary Islands)
- C. sindecimus Marshall, 2000 (Costa Rica)
- C. ventrisetis Kuwahara & Marshall, 2020 (Brazil, Costa Rica, Venezuela)
