= Christian Stenhammar =

Swedish priest and botanist (1783–1866)

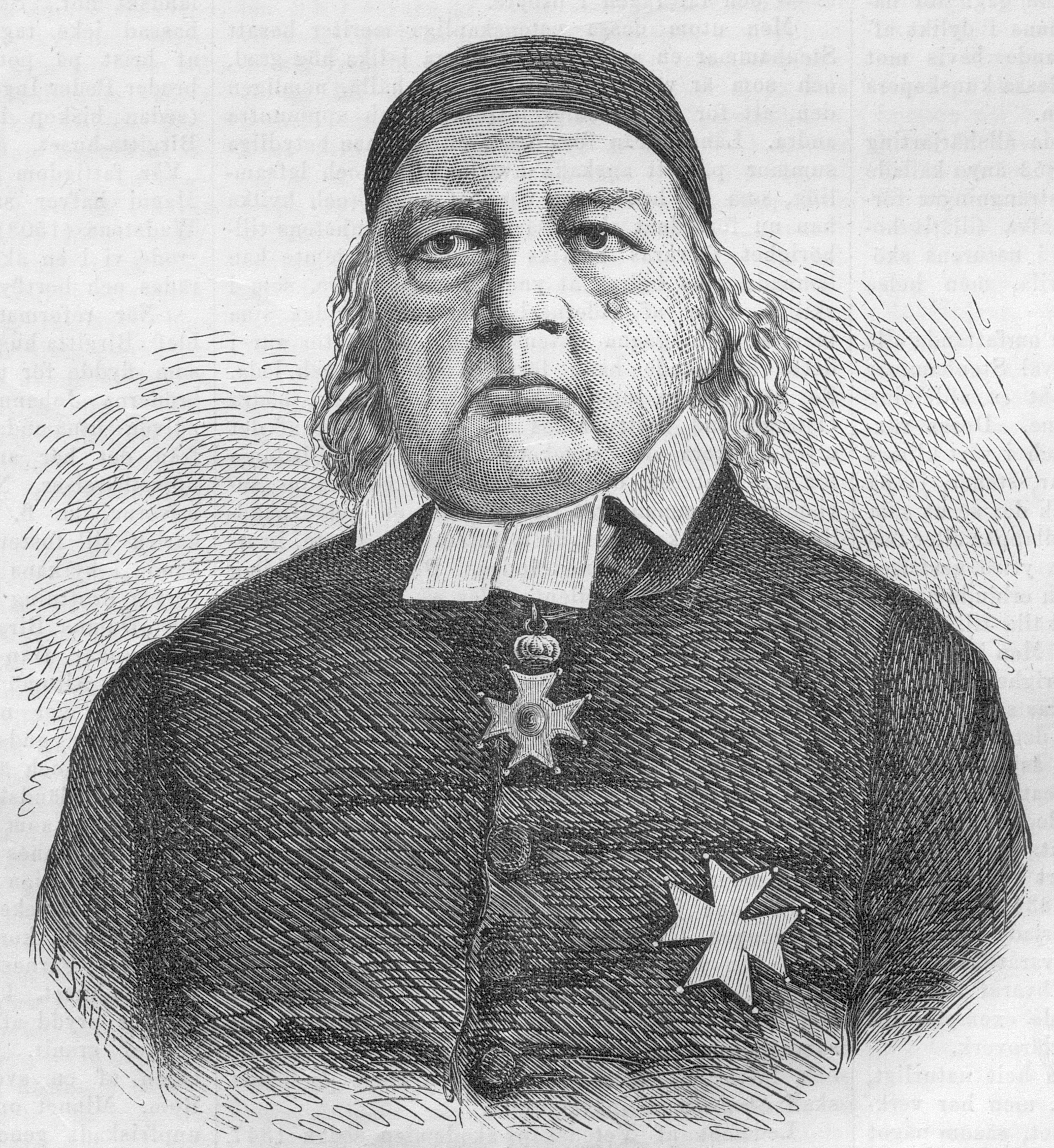
Christian Stenhammar

Christian Stenhammar (1783-1866) was a Swedish naturalist interested in lichens and an entomologist who specialised in Diptera.His collection is held by Uppsala University. He was a clergyman.

== Works ==
- Försök till Gruppering och Revision af de Svenska Ephydrinae af Chr. Stenhammar. Stockholm, P.A. Nordstedt, 1844. online
- Schedulæ criticæ de lichenibus exsiccatis Sueciæ (1845) (schedae are belonging to the exsiccata series Lichenes exsiccati Sueciae, curante Chr. Stenhammar, 1825-1833)
- Lichenes Sueciæ exsiccati editio altera (åtta delar, 1856–66) (schedae are belonging to the exsiccata Lichenes Sueciae exsiccati, in primo editionis alterius fasciculo divulgati, curante Chr. Stenhammar, 1855-1865).
- Skandinaviens copromyzinæ (1853)

== Honours ==
They have been several genera named to honour Christian Stenhammar including;

- Steenhammera Rchb. 1831 (Boraginaceae), a synonym of Mertensia,
- Stenhammara Flot. ex Körb. 1855 (Lichenes), a synonym of Ropalospora lugubris,
- Stenhammara A.Massal. ex Zahlbr. 1924 (Fungi), a synonym of Stenhammarella
- Stenhammarella Hertel 1967 (Lichen in Lecideaceae family).

Steenhamera Kostel. 1834, Stenhammaria Lilja 1843 and Stenhammaria Nyman 1881 (all from the Boraginaceae family) are all listed as 'doubtful' genera as they don't have any species listed.

The standard author abbreviation Stenh. is used to indicate this person as the author when citing a botanical name.

== Other sources ==
Eckhard K. Groll
