= Oswald Duda =

German entomologist (1869-1941)

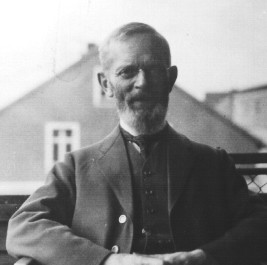
Oswald Duda

Oswald Duda (11 April 1869 – 21 November 1941), full name Pavel Theodor Friedrich Oswald Duda was a German entomologist mainly interested in Diptera.

Duda was born in Silesia 11 April 1869. He died in Habelschwerdt now Bystrzyca Kłodzka 21 November 1941.

== Publications ==
(selected)

- 1918. Revision der europäischen Arten der Gattung Limosina Macquart (Dipteren).Abhandlungen der k.k. zoologisch-botanischen Gesellschaft in Wien 10(1): 1–240.
- 1920. Revision der altweltlichen Arten der Gattung Sphaerocera Latreille (Dipteren).Tijdschrift voor Entomologie 63: 1-39.
- 1920 Vorläufige Mitteilung zur Kenntnis der aussereuropäischen Arten der Gattungen Leptocera Olivier = Limosina Macq. und Borborus Meigen (Dipteren). Zoologische Jahrbücher. Zeitschrift für Systematik, Geographie und Biologie der Tiere, Jena 43: 433–446.
- 1921. Fiebrigella und Archiborborus, zwei neue südamerikanische Borboriden-Gattungen (Dipteren). Tijdschrift voor Entomologie 64: 119–146.
- 1922. Borborinae. In Becker, T.: Wissenschaftliche Ergebnisse der mit Unterstützung der Akademie der Wissenschaften in Wien aus der Erbschaft Treitl von F. Werner unternommenen zoologischen Expedition nach dem Anglo-Ägyptischen Sudan (Kordofan)Bibliography 341 1914. VI. Diptera. Denkschriften der (keiserlichen) Akademie der Wissenschaften, Wien, Mathematisch-Naturwissenschaftliche Klasse, 98: 75–77.
- 1923. Revision der altweltlichen Arten der Gattung Borborus (Cypsela) Meigen (Dipteren). Archiv für Naturgeschichte, Berlin, Abteilung A, 89 (4): 35–112.
- 1924. Beitrag zur Systematik der Limosinen-Untergattungen Trachyopella und Elachisoma und Beschreibung von Elachisoma pilosa, n.sp. ♀ (Dipteren). Konowia 3: 5–9.
- 1924. Berichtigungen zur Revision der europäischen Arten der Gattung Limosina Macq. (Dipteren), nebst Beschreibung von sechs neuen Arten. Verhandlungen der zoologisch-botanischen Gesellschaft in Wien 73(1923): 163–180.
- 1924. Aptilotella Borgmeieri ♂, eine neue flügellose Borboride (Dipt.) aus Brasilien. Tijdschrift voor Entomologie 64: 119–146.
- 1925. Die außereuropäischen Arten der Gattung Leptocera Olivier - Limosina Macquart(Dipteren) mit Berücksichtigung der europäischen Arten. Archiv für Naturgeschichte, Berlin, Abteilung A, 90(11)(1924): 5–215.
- 1926. Sphaerocera cornuta ♀, eine neue Borboride (Diptera) aus Centralafrika. Deutsche entomologische Zeitschrift 1925: 381–384.
- 1928. Bemerkungen zur Systematik und Ökologie einiger europäischer Limosinen und Beschreibung von Scotophilella splendens n.sp. (Diptera). Konowia 7: 162–174.
- 1929. Die Ausbeute der deutschen Chako-Expedition 1925/1926 (Diptera). VI. Sepsidae, VII. Piophilidae, VIII. Cypselidae, IX. Drosophilidae und X. Chloropidae. Konowia 8(1): 33–50.
- 1935. Cypselidae. In Sjöstedt Y.: Entomologische Ergebnisse der schwedischen Kamtchatka-Expedition 1920–1922. Arkiv för Zoologi, A, 28: 12–13.
- 1938. 57. Sphaeroceridae (Cypselidae). In Lindner, E. (ed.): Die Fliegen der Paläarktischen Region. Vol.6, 182 pp., E. Schweizerbart.sche Verlagsbuchhandlung, Stuttgart.
