= An Essay on the Classification of the Parasitic Hymenoptera of Britain Which Correspond with the Ichneumones Minuti of Linnaeus =

Victorian entomology monograph

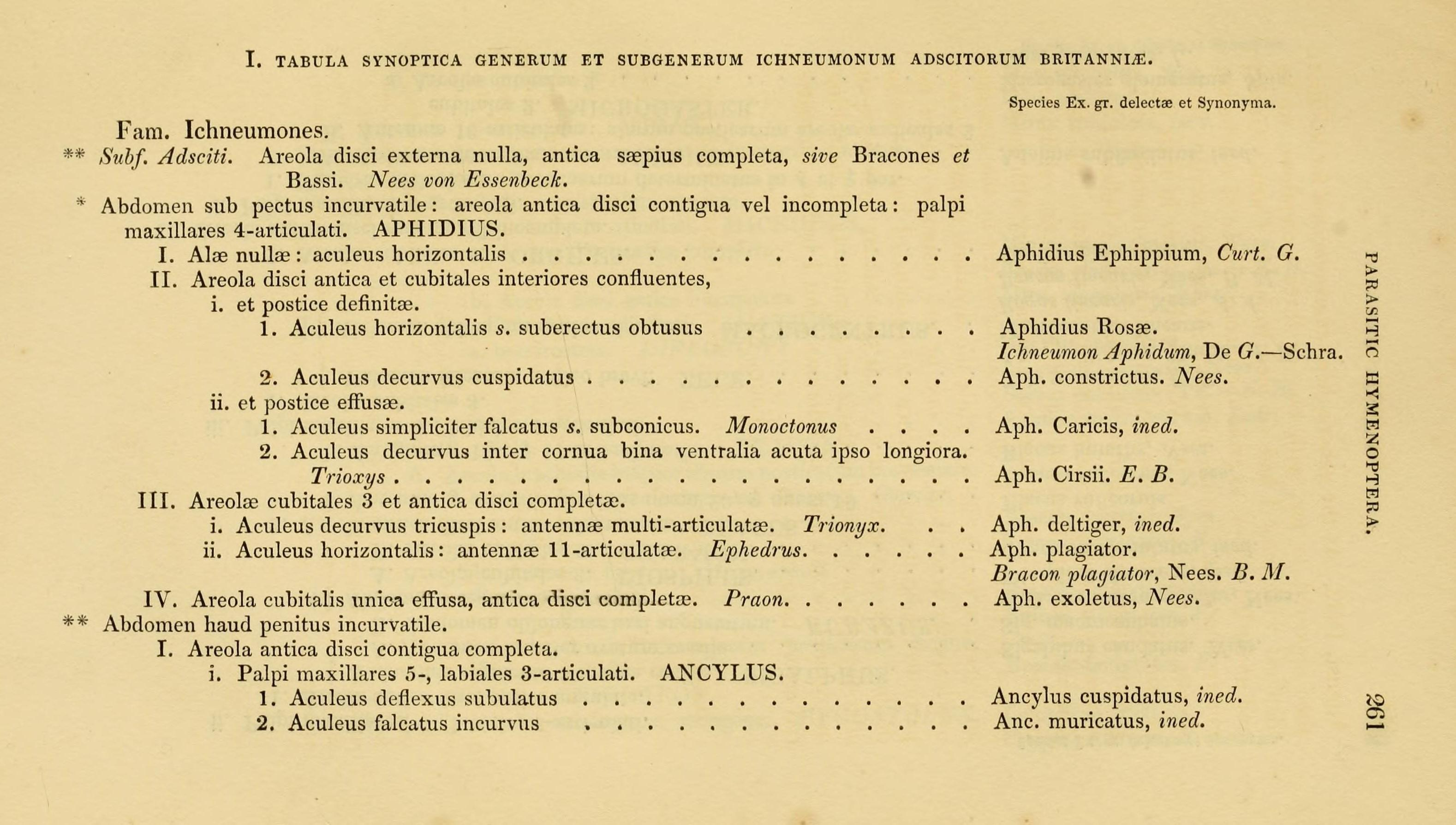
First page of Tabula synoptica generum et subgenerum ichneumonum adscitorum Britanniae Synoptic Table of Genera and Subgenera of Ichneumons

An Essay on the Classification of the Parasitic Hymenoptera of Britain Which Correspond with the Ichneumones Minuti of Linnaeus is a Victorian monograph of entomology published in the Entomological Magazine between 1833 and 1838, by the Irish entomologist Alexander Henry Haliday.

The Ichneumones minuti of Linnaeus broadly correspond to the Braconidae and (superfamily Chalcidoidea). Haliday establishes higher level taxa (families) and describes new genera and species. The synoptic tables and descriptions are in Latin. Characters used are (mainly) morphology of the abdomen and thorax, wing venation, number of antennal segments and number of maxillary palpi segments.

The essay begins with I Tabula synoptica generum et subgenerum ichneumonum adscitorum Britanniae Synoptic Table of Genera and Subgenera of Ichneumons Found in Britain (Braconidae). This functions as a dichotomous key.

Part II is Excerptae Quedam e Methodo Chalidum Parts of a method and groups of chalcids

- I Pteromali
- II Spalangiae

The collections (other than his own) consulted were those of John Curtis and Mus. Soc. Ent. (Museum of the Entomological Society)

Works consulted (Auctores laudati) were

- Nees (BM) Gesellschaft Naturforsch:freunde zu Berlin Magazin v d 1811-1816(Ichneumones adsciti a Nees von Essenbeck) (sic). This series (1811, 1812,1814, 1816) was the first attempt to establish a hierarchy of classification for the Adsciti or Braconidae. Nees worked in close association with Johann Ludwig Christian Gravenhorst, who had in 1807 published a monograph on the Ichneumonidae). Nees uses word familia to signify groups of species within a genus as well as groups of genera. He gave collective names to these groups (Cheloni, Sigalphi, Microgasteres, Agathides, Bracones, and Bassi).
- Nees (AA) Acta Nova Physs-med:Academiae Caesar:Leopold Naturae Curiosorum( Conspectus Ichneumonum:linea2 ab eodem)-Laudatum in Ichneumonal Europ.
- Nees Hymenopterorum Ichneumonibus affinium monographiae (1834, 2 vols.) Parts of the Essay after 1834
- Johann Karl Wilhelm Illiger, 1807. Fauna Etrusca. Sistens Insecta quae in provinciis Florentina et Pisana praesertim collegit Petrus Rossius in regio Pisano athenaeo publ.prof. et soc. Ital. Vol. 2. Iterum edita et annotatis perpetuis aucta a D. Carolo Illiger. Helmstadii, Litteris C. G. Fleckeisen.
- Carl Fredrik Fallén, 1813. Specimen Novam Hymenoptera Disponendi Methodum Exhibens. Dissertation. Berling, Lund. pp. 1–41. 1 pl.
- Dalman, 1820, Försök till Uppställning af Insect-familjen Pteromalini, i synnerhet med afseen de på de i Sverige funne Arter. (Fortsättning) Kungliga Svenska Vetenskapsakademiens Handlingar 41(2):340-385 and 1823, Analeceta Entomologica :viii+108pp, 4 pls Stockholm
- John Curtis various dated folios British Entomology
- John Curtis 1829 A guide to the arrangement of British insects

== List of Braconidae described ==
=== A ===
- abdita Haliday, 1838
- abjectum (Haliday, 1833, Aphidius)
- accinctus (Haliday, 1835, Leiophron)
- aceris (Haliday, 1833, Aphidius)
- adducta (Haliday, 1839, Alysia)
- aemula (Haliday, 1836, Opius)
- aethiops (Haliday, 1837, Opius)
- albipennis (Haliday, 1834, Microgaster)
- albipes (Haliday, 1839, Alysia)
- alexis Haliday, 1834.
- ambiguus (Haliday, 1834, Aphidius)
- ambulans Haliday, 1835
- ampliator (Haliday, 1839, Alysia)
- ancilla (Haliday, 1838, Alysia)
- angelicae (Haliday, 1833, Aphidius)
- angustula (Haliday, 1838, Alysia)
- annularis (Haliday, 1834, Microgaster)
- apicalis Haliday, 1833
- arenarius (Haliday, 1834, Microgaster)
- arundinis Haliday, 1834
- asteris Haliday, 1834
- auctus (Haliday, 1833, Aphidius)
- aurora (Haliday, 1838, Alysia)
- avenae Haliday, 1834

=== B ===
- bajulus (Haliday, 1837, Opius)
- biglumis (Haliday, 1836, Rogas)
- braconius Haliday, 1833
- brevicollis Haliday, 1835
- brevicornis (Haliday, 1833, Aphidius)

=== C ===
- caelatus (Haliday, 1837, Opius)
- caesa (Haliday, 1837, Opius)
- calceata (Haliday, 1834, Microgaster)
- caligatus (Haliday, 1835, Meteorus)
- callidus (Haliday, 1834, Microgaster)
- candidata (Haliday, 1834, Microgaster)
- catenator (Haliday, 1836, Rogas)
- caricis (Haliday, 1833, Aphidius)
- celsus Haliday, 1837
- centaureae (Haliday, 1833, Aphidius)
- cerealium Haliday, 1835
- cinctus (Haliday, 1839, Alysia)
- cirsii Haliday, 1834
- clandestina (Haliday, 1839, Alysia)
- clarus Haliday, 1836
- clavator Haliday, 1833
- colon (Haliday, 1835, Perilitus)
- compressa (Haliday, 1838, Alysia)
- concinnum (Haliday, 1838, Alysia)
- conspurcator (Haliday, 1838, Alysia)
- consularis (Haliday, 1834, Microgaster)
- contaminatus (Haliday, 1834, Microgaster)
- contracta Haliday, 1833 Alysia GENOTYPE of ALLOEA
- crepidis (Haliday, 1834, Aphidius)
- cruentatus Haliday, 1833
- cunctator (Haliday, 1836, Rogas)
- cuspidatus (Haliday, 1833, Ancylus)

=== D ===
- decora (Haliday, 1834, Microgaster)
- decorator (Haliday, 1836, Rogas)
- dilecta (Haliday, 1834, Microgaster)
- diremptus (Haliday, 1839, Alysia)
- dispar (Haliday, 1833, Rogas)
- docilis (Haliday, 1837, Opius)
- dorsale (Haliday, 1833, Aphidius)

=== E ===
- edentatus (Haliday, 1835, Leiophron)
- eglanteriae Haliday, 1834
- elaphus Haliday, 1833
- ephippium (Haliday, 1834, Aphidius)
- equestris (Haliday, 1834, Microgaster)
- ervi Haliday, 1834
- eugenia (Haliday, 1838, Alysia)
- eunice (Haliday, 1838, Alysia)
- excrucians (Haliday, 1835, Leiophron)
- excubitor (Haliday, 1836, Rogas)
- exiguus (Haliday, 1834, Aphidius)
- exiguus (Haliday, 1834, Microgaster)
- exilis (Haliday, 1834, Microgaster)
- exilis Haliday, 1837

=== F ===
- filator (Haliday, 1835, Perilitus)
- flavifrons Haliday, 1840
- flavinode (Haliday, 1833, Aphidius)
- flavipes (Haliday, 1838, Alysia)
- flavipes (Haliday, 1835, Helcon)
- flaviventris (Haliday, 1838, Alysia)
- florimela (Haliday, 1838, Alysia)
- foveolus (Haliday, 1839, Alysia)
- fragilis (Haliday, 1836, Rogas)
- fucicola (Haliday, 1838, Alysia)
- fulgidum (Haliday, 1837, Opius)
- fuliginosa (Haliday, 1838, Alysia)
- fulvicornis (Haliday, 1838, Alysia)
- fulvipes (Haliday, 1835, Helcon)
- fulvipes (Haliday, 1834, Microgaster)
- fumatus Haliday, 1834
- funestus (Haliday, 1836, Rogas)
- fuscula (Haliday, 1839, Alysia)
- fuscicornis (Haliday, 1838, Alysia)

=== G ===
- galatea (Haliday, 1838, Alysia)
- germanus (Haliday, 1834, Acaelius)
- gilvipes (Haliday, 1839, Alysia)

=== H ===
- haemorrhoeus (Haliday, 1837, Opius)
- hariolator (Haliday, 1836, Rogas)
- hastatus Haliday, 1835
- heraclei (Haliday, 1833, Aphidius)
- hilaris (Haliday, 1834, Microgaster)

=== I ===
- idalius (Haliday, 1833, Perilitus)
- immunis (Haliday, 1834, Microgaster)
- imperator (Haliday, 1836, Rogas)
- indagator (Haliday, 1836, Rogas)
- infulata (Haliday, 1834, Aphidius)
- infumata (Haliday, 1834, Microgaster)
- ingratus (Haliday, 1834, Microgaster)
- infima (Haliday, 1834, Microgaster)
- intacta (Haliday, 1835, Leiophron)
- intricata (Haliday, 1834, Microgaster)
- isabella (Haliday, 1838, Alysia)

=== J ===
- jaculans (Haliday, 1838, Alysia)
- jaculator (Haliday, 1835, Perilitus)

=== L ===
- lacertosus (Haliday, 1833, Aphidius)
- lancifer (Haliday, 1836, Dyscolus)
- laricis (Haliday, 1834, Aphidius)
- lateralis (Haliday, 1839, Alysia)
- lateralis (Haliday, 1834, Microgaster)
- lepidus (Haliday, 1835, Helcon)
- leptogaster (Haliday, 1839, Alysia)
- letifer (Haliday, 1833, Aphidius)
- leucopterus (Haliday, 1834, Aphidius)
- lituratus (Haliday, 1835, Leiophron)
- livida (Haliday, 1838, Alysia)
- lucia Haliday, 1838 Alysia
- lucicola Haliday, 1838 Alysia
- luctuosa Haliday, 1834
- lugens (Haliday, 1839, Alysia)
- lugens Haliday, 1837
- lustrator (Haliday, 1836, Rogas)
- lutescens Haliday, 1834
- lymphata (Haliday, 1839, Alysia)

=== M ===
- macrospila (Haliday, 1839, Alysia)
- marginalis (Haliday, 1839, Alysia)
- maria (Haliday, 1838, Alysia)
- maritima (Haliday, 1838, Alysia)
- matricariae Haliday, 1834
- mediator (Haliday, 1834, Microgaster)
- meditator (Haliday, 1836, Rogas)
- meridiana Haliday, 1834
- messoria Haliday, 1834
- micropterus (Haliday, 1835, Perilitus)
- minutus (Haliday, 1833, Aphidius)
- mitis (Haliday, 1833, Leiophron)
- muricatus (Haliday, 1833, Ancylus)

=== N ===
- naiadum (Haliday, 1839, Alysia)
- nephele (Haliday, 1838, Alysia)
- nereidum (Haliday, 1839, Alysia)
- nervosus (Haliday, 1833, Aphidius)
- nina (Haliday, 1838, Alysia)
- nobilis (Haliday, 1834, Rogas)

=== O ===
- oleraceus Haliday, 1833

=== P ===
- pacta (Haliday, 1837, Opius)
- paganus Haliday, 1835
- [pallidinotus Haliday, 1834 nom. nud.]
- pallidus (Haliday, 1833, Aphidius)
- pallipes Haliday, 1835
- pendulus Haliday, 1837
- phoenicura (Haliday, 1839, Alysia)
- picinervis (Haliday, 1838, Alysia)
- picipes (Haliday, 1835, Leiophron)
- picipes (Haliday, 1835, Helcon)
- picta (Haliday, 1834, Aphidius)
- pini (Haliday, 1834, Aphidius)
- placida (Haliday, 1834, Microgaster)
- placidus (Haliday, 1837, Opius)
- podagrica (Haliday, 1839, Alysia)
- popularis (Haliday, 1834, Microgaster)
- posticus (Haliday, 1839, Alysia)
- praepotens (Haliday, 1834, Microgaster)
- praetextata (Haliday, 1834, Microgaster)
- procera (Haliday, 1839, Alysia)
- profligator (Haliday, 1835, Perilitus)
- puber (Haliday, 1835, Helcon)
- pullata (Haliday, 1838, Alysia)
- pulverosus (Haliday, 1839, Alysia)
- punctigera (Haliday, 1838, Alysia)

=== R ===
- ribis Haliday, 1834
- rosae Haliday, 1833
- rubripes (Haliday, 1834, Microgaster)
- ruficrus (Haliday, 1834, Microgaster)
- rufilabris Haliday, 1833
- rufinotata (Haliday, 1838, Alysia)
- russata (Haliday, 1834, Microgaster)
- rusticus (Haliday, 1837, Opius)

=== S ===
- saeva (Haliday, 1837, Opius)
- salicis Haliday, 1834
- secalis Haliday, 1833
- semirugosa (Haliday, 1839, Alysia)
- semistriatus (Haliday, 1835, Helcon)
- sodalis (Haliday, 1834, Microgaster)
- spartii Haliday, 1835
- spectabilis (Haliday, 1834, Microgaster)
- speculator (Haliday, 1835, Helcon)
- speculum (Haliday, 1838, Alysia)
- spinolae Haliday, 1834
- spretus Haliday, 1836
- stramineipes (Haliday, 1839, Alysia)
- striatula (Haliday, 1839, Alysia)
- sylvaticus (Haliday, 1837, Opius)
- sylvia (Haliday, 1839, Alysia)

=== T ===
- tabidus (Haliday, 1836, Rogas)
- tacita (Haliday, 1837, Opius)
- talaris (Haliday, 1839, Alysia)
- temporale (Fischer, 1958, Opius)
- temula (Haliday, 1839, Alysia)
- tibialis (Haliday, 1835, Helcon)
- tripudians Haliday, 1835
- trivialis Haliday, 1835

=== U ===
- uliginosus (Haliday, 1839, Alysia)
- umbellatarum (Haliday, 1834, Microgaster)
- umbratilis Haliday, 1833
- urticae Haliday, 1834

=== V ===
- validus (Haliday, 1833, Aphidius)
- venustum (Haliday, 1838, Alysia)
- vestalis (Haliday, 1834, Microgaster)
- vestigator (Haliday, 1836, Rogas)
- vexator (Haliday, 1835, Perilitus)
- victus (Haliday, 1837, Opius)
- vindex Haliday, 1837
- [viminalis Haliday, 1834 nom. nud.]
- volucre (Haliday, 1833, Aphidius)

=== W ===
- wesmaelii (Haliday, 1837, Opius)
