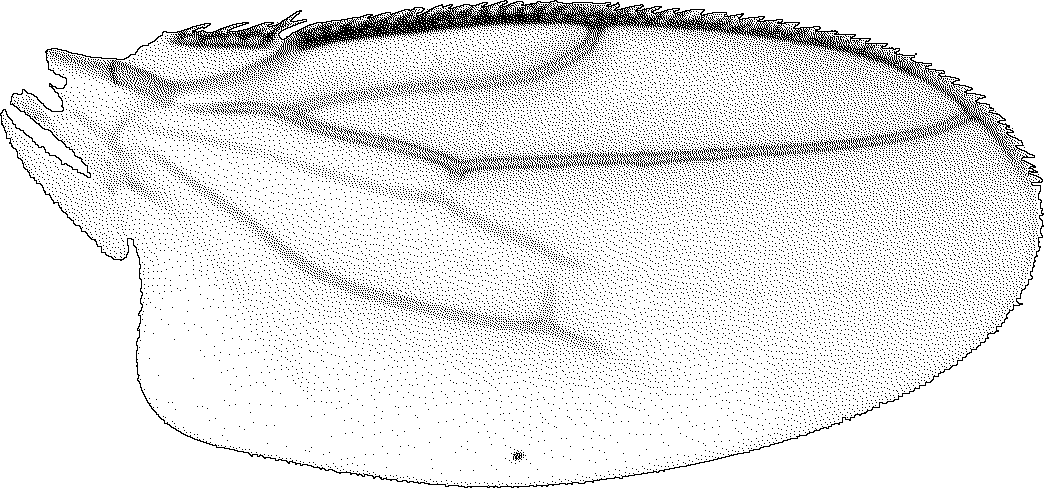
- Wing of Pullimosina pullula

Scientific classification
- Kingdom: Animalia
- Phylum: Arthropoda
- Class: Insecta
- Order: Diptera
- Family: Sphaeroceridae
- Subfamily: Limosininae
- Genus: Pullimosina; Roháček, 1983

Type species
- Limosina heteroneura Haliday, 1836

= Pullimosina =

Genus of flies

Pullimosina is a genus of flies in the family Sphaeroceridae, the lesser dung flies.

== Subgenera and species ==
Pullimosina (Dahlimosina) Roháček, 1983

- Pullimosina bladesi Marshall, 1993
- Pullimosina dahli (Duda, 1918)
- Pullimosina darwini (Richards, 1931)
- Pullimosina hirsutiphallus Marshall, 1986
- Pullimosina karelica (Papp, 1979)
- Pullimosina paramoesta (Duda, 1925)
- Pullimosina yukonensis Marshall, 1986

Pullimosina (Pullimosina) Roháček, 1983

- Pullimosina costata (Richards, 1968)
- Pullimosina geminata Marshall, 1986
- Pullimosina heteroneura (Haliday, 1836)
- Pullimosina latipes (Duda, 1925)
- Pullimosina longicornuta (Papp, 1973)
- Pullimosina longicosta (Spuler, 1925)
- Pullimosina mcalpinei Marshall, 1986
- Pullimosina meijerei (Duda, 1918)
- Pullimosina meruinaa (Richards, 1965)
- Pullimosina moesta (Villeneuve, 1918)
- Pullimosina propecaeca (Richards, 1966)
- Pullimosina pullula (Zetterstedt, 1847)
- Pullimosina ryukyuensis Hayashi, 2006
- Pullimosina umphreyi Marshall, 1986
- Pullimosina vockerothi Marshall, 1986
- Pullimosina woodi Marshall, 1986
- Pullimosina vernalis Hayashi, 2006
- Pullimosina vulgesta Roháček, 2001
- Pullimosina zayensis Marshall, 1986
