= Chaetopodella =

Scientific classification
- Kingdom: Animalia
- Phylum: Arthropoda
- Class: Insecta
- Order: Diptera
- Family: Sphaeroceridae
- Subfamily: Limosininae
- Genus: Chaetopodella; Duda, 1920

Type species
- Limosina scutellaris Haliday, 1836

Genus of flies

Chaetopodella is a genus of flies belonging to the family Sphaeroceridae, the lesser dung flies.

== Species ==
- Subgenus Afrochaetopodella Papp, 2008
  - C. keniaca Papp, 2008
  - C. reducta Papp, 2008
- Subgenus Chaetopodella (Duda, 1920)
  - C. aethiopica Papp, 2008
  - C. cursoni (Richards, 1939)
  - C. demeteri Papp, 2008
  - C. denigrata (Duda, 1925)
  - C. impermissa (Richards, 1980)
  - C. latitarsis Hayashi & Papp, 2007
  - C. lesnei (Séguy, 1933)
  - C. nigeriae Papp, 2008
  - C. nigrinotum Hayashi & Papp, 2007
  - C. orientalis Hayashi & Papp, 2007
  - C. ornata Hayashi & Papp, 2007
  - C. scutellaris (Haliday, 1836)
