= Chaetopodella (Chaetopodella) =

Scientific classification
- Kingdom: Animalia
- Phylum: Arthropoda
- Class: Insecta
- Order: Diptera
- Family: Sphaeroceridae
- Genus: Chaetopodella
- Subgenus: Chaetopodella; Duda, 1920

Type species
- Limosina scutellaris Haliday, 1836

Subgenus of flies

Chaetopodella is a subgenus of flies in the genus Chaetopodella belonging to the family Sphaeroceridae, the lesser dung flies.

== Species ==
- Chaetopodella aethiopica Papp, 2008
- Chaetopodella cursoni (Richards, 1939)
- Chaetopodella demeteri Papp, 2008
- Chaetopodella denigrata (Duda, 1925)
- Chaetopodella impermissa (Richards, 1980)
- Chaetopodella latitarsis Hayashi & Papp, 2007
- Chaetopodella lesnei (Séguy, 1933)
- Chaetopodella nigeriae Papp, 2008
- Chaetopodella nigrinotum Hayashi & Papp, 2007
- Chaetopodella orientalis Hayashi & Papp, 2007
- Chaetopodella ornata Hayashi & Papp, 2007
- Chaetopodella scutellaris (Haliday, 1836)
