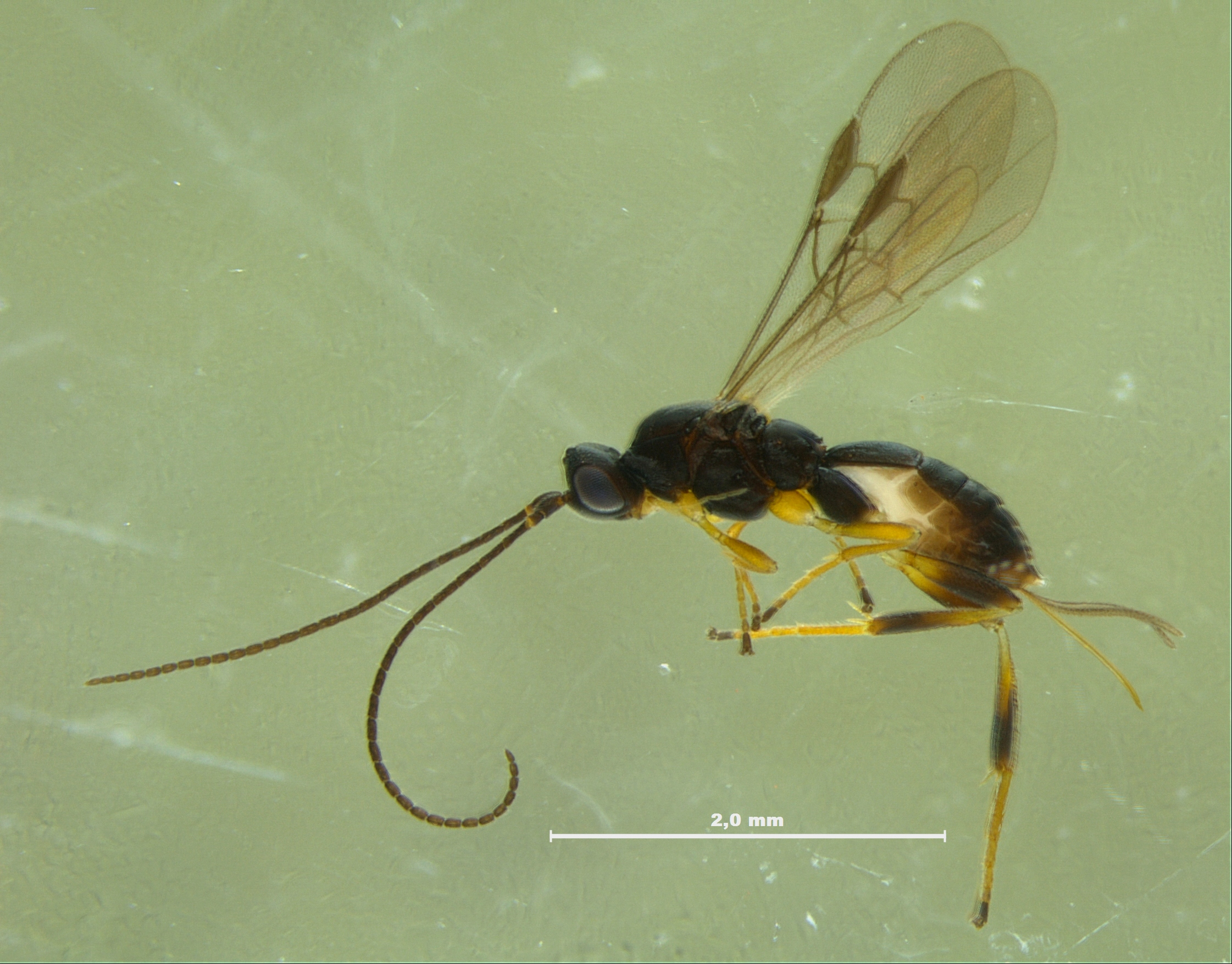
- Orgilus niger

Scientific classification
- Domain: Eukaryota
- Kingdom: Animalia
- Phylum: Arthropoda
- Class: Insecta
- Order: Hymenoptera
- Family: Braconidae
- Subfamily: Orgilinae
- Genus: Orgilus; Haliday, 1833

= Orgilus =

Genus of insects

Orgilus is a genus of insects belonging to the family Braconidae.

The genus has almost cosmopolitan distribution.

== Species ==
- Orgilus abbreviator (Ratzeburg, 1852)
- Orgilus ablusus Muesebeck, 1970
- Orgilus absonus Muesebeck, 1970
- Orgilus achterbergi Taeger, 1989
- Orgilus affinis Taeger, 1991
- Orgilus agrestis Muesebeck, 1970
- Orgilus alacer Muesebeck, 1970
- Orgilus alboannulatus van Achterberg, 2000
- Orgilus albosignatus van Achterberg, 1987
- Orgilus amplissimus Chou, 1995
- Orgilus amyrossmanae Sharkey, 2021
- Orgilus anthracinus Muesebeck, 1970
- Orgilus anurus Thomson, 1895
- Orgilus apostolicus Turner, 1922
- Orgilus arcticus Muesebeck, 1970
- Orgilus ashmeadii (Brues, 1933)
- Orgilus asper Taeger, 1989
- Orgilus asperrimus Taeger, 1989
- Orgilus austroussuricus Belokobylskij, 1998
- Orgilus balcanicus Taeger, 1989
- Orgilus balsameae Muesebeck, 1970
- Orgilus bifasciatus Turner, 1922
- Orgilus boharti Muesebeck, 1970
- Orgilus bohayicus Belokobylskij & Taeger, 1996
- Orgilus brevicaudatus van Achterberg, 2000
- Orgilus brevicaudis Taeger, 1989
- Orgilus brevipalpis Taeger, 1991
- Orgilus buccatus Muesebeck, 1970
- Orgilus burksi Muesebeck, 1970
- Orgilus caballus Chou, 1995
- Orgilus californicus (Provancher, 1888)
- Orgilus caliginosus Taeger, 1989
- Orgilus capeki Taeger, 1989
- Orgilus capsicola Muesebeck, 1970
- Orgilus caritus Chou, 1995
- Orgilus carrolyoonae Sharkey, 2021
- Orgilus caudatus Granger, 1949
- Orgilus cerinus Muesebeck, 1970
- Orgilus chankaicus Belokobylskij & Taeger, 1998
- Orgilus christhompsoni Sharkey, 2021
- Orgilus christinemcmahonae Sharkey, 2021
- Orgilus cincticornis Granger, 1949
- Orgilus cinctus Muesebeck, 1970
- Orgilus cingulatus Granger, 1949
- Orgilus citus Muesebeck, 1970
- Orgilus claripennis Ivanov, 1899
- Orgilus clivicola Muesebeck, 1970
- Orgilus cognatus Muesebeck, 1970
- Orgilus coleophorae Muesebeck, 1970
- Orgilus coloradensis Muesebeck, 1970
- Orgilus columbianus (Enderlein, 1912)
- Orgilus compactus Muesebeck, 1970
- Orgilus comptanae Muesebeck, 1970
- Orgilus conflictanae Muesebeck, 1970
- Orgilus consuetus Muesebeck, 1970
- Orgilus coracinus Muesebeck, 1970
- Orgilus coreanus Taeger, 1987
- Orgilus coriaceus Granger, 1949
- Orgilus coxalis Taeger, 1989
- Orgilus cretus Chou, 1995
- Orgilus cristatus Muesebeck, 1970
- Orgilus cunctus Chou, 1995
- Orgilus cuneatus (Provancher, 1888)
- Orgilus detectiformis Viereck, 1917
- Orgilus detectus Provancher, 1886
- Orgilus dianalipscombae Sharkey, 2021
- Orgilus dilleri Beyarslan, 1996
- Orgilus dioryctriae Gahan, 1919
- Orgilus discrepans Muesebeck, 1970
- Orgilus discretus Taeger, 1989
- Orgilus disparilis Muesebeck, 1970
- Orgilus dissidens Muesebeck, 1970
- Orgilus distinguendus Taeger, 1991
- Orgilus dolosus Muesebeck, 1970
- Orgilus dorni Taeger, 1989
- Orgilus dovnari Tobias, 1986
- Orgilus dreisbachi Muesebeck, 1970
- Orgilus dubius Taeger, 1989
- Orgilus ebbenielsoni Sharkey, 2021
- Orgilus ejuncidus Muesebeck, 1970
- Orgilus elasmopalpi Muesebeck, 1970
- Orgilus elizabethpennisiae Sharkey, 2021
- Orgilus elongatus Papp, 1971
- Orgilus eous Belokobylskij & Taeger, 1996
- Orgilus erythropus Muesebeck, 1970
- Orgilus evertlindquisti Sharkey, 2021
- Orgilus excellens Taeger, 1989
- Orgilus exilis Muesebeck, 1970
- Orgilus facialis Tobias, 1964
- Orgilus fallax Muesebeck, 1970
- Orgilus femoralis Muesebeck, 1970
- Orgilus ferus Muesebeck, 1970
- Orgilus festivus Papp, 1975
- Orgilus fictus Muesebeck, 1970
- Orgilus fischerianus Taeger, 1989
- Orgilus fisheri Muesebeck, 1970
- Orgilus frigidus Muesebeck, 1970
- Orgilus fulgens Muesebeck, 1970
- Orgilus fulvus Belokobylskij & Taeger, 1998
- Orgilus galbinus Chou, 1995
- Orgilus gauldi van Achterberg, 1987
- Orgilus geijskesi van Achterberg, 1987
- Orgilus gelechiae (Ashmead, 1889)
- Orgilus gelechiaevora Cushman, 1920
- Orgilus genalis van Achterberg, 1987
- Orgilus genestoermeri Sharkey, 2021
- Orgilus glabratus van Achterberg, 1987
- Orgilus glacialis Muesebeck, 1970
- Orgilus gossypii Muesebeck, 1956
- Orgilus gracilis (Brues, 1908)
- Orgilus gramineus Muesebeck, 1970
- Orgilus grandior (Brues, 1933)
- Orgilus grapholithae Muesebeck, 1970
- Orgilus grunini Tobias, 1986
- Orgilus haeselbarthi Taeger, 1989
- Orgilus hofferi Capek, 1989
- Orgilus huddlestoni Taeger, 1989
- Orgilus hungaricus Szepligeti, 1896
- Orgilus hyalinus Muesebeck, 1970
- Orgilus hybridus Taeger, 1989
- Orgilus ibericus Taeger, 1989
- Orgilus imitator Muesebeck, 1970
- Orgilus immarginatus Muesebeck, 1970
- Orgilus impiger Muesebeck, 1970
- Orgilus improcerus Chou, 1995
- Orgilus indagator Muesebeck, 1967
- Orgilus infrequens Muesebeck, 1970
- Orgilus infumatus Granger, 1949
- Orgilus inopinus Muesebeck, 1970
- Orgilus insularis Muesebeck, 1970
- Orgilus interjectus Taeger, 1989
- Orgilus intermedius Muesebeck, 1970
- Orgilus invictus Muesebeck, 1970
- Orgilus iphigeniae van Achterberg, 1987
- Orgilus ischnus Marshall, 1898
- Orgilus jamesriegeri Sharkey, 2021
- Orgilus jeanmillerae Sharkey, 2021
- Orgilus jeffmilleri Sharkey, 2021
- Orgilus jennieae Marsh, 1979
- Orgilus jerrypowelli Sharkey, 2021
- Orgilus jimtiedjei Sharkey, 2021
- Orgilus johnlundbergi Sharkey, 2021
- Orgilus johnpipolyi Sharkey, 2021
- Orgilus jorgellorentei Sharkey, 2021
- Orgilus kaszabi Taeger, 1991
- Orgilus kumatai Watanabe, 1968
- Orgilus kurentzovi Belokobylskij, 1998
- Orgilus laeviventris (Cresson, 1872)
- Orgilus larryspearsi Sharkey, 2021
- Orgilus lateralis (Cresson, 1872)
- Orgilus lautus Muesebeck, 1970
- Orgilus leleji Belokobylskij & Taeger, 1996
- Orgilus lepidus Muesebeck, 1967
- Orgilus leptocephalus (Hartig, 1838)
- Orgilus levis Muesebeck, 1970
- Orgilus lini Chou, 1995
- Orgilus lissus Muesebeck, 1970
- Orgilus longiceps Muesebeck, 1933
- Orgilus longicornis (Brues, 1933)
- Orgilus lucidus Turner, 1927
- Orgilus luctuosus Taeger, 1987
- Orgilus lunaris Muesebeck, 1970
- Orgilus macrurus Muesebeck, 1970
- Orgilus maculiventris (Cresson, 1872)
- Orgilus magadanicus Belokobylskij, 1998
- Orgilus marlinricei Sharkey, 2021
- Orgilus medicaginis Muesebeck, 1970
- Orgilus mediterraneus Taeger, 1989
- Orgilus meifengensis Chou, 1995
- Orgilus melissopi Muesebeck, 1970
- Orgilus mellipes (Say, 1836)
- Orgilus mellissaespinozae Sharkey, 2021
- Orgilus meyeri Telenga, 1933
- Orgilus mikesmithi Sharkey, 2021
- Orgilus mimicus Muesebeck, 1970
- Orgilus minor Taeger, 1989
- Orgilus minutus Cameron, 1900
- Orgilus minutus Szepligeti, 1898
- Orgilus moczari Papp, 1981
- Orgilus modicus Muesebeck, 1970
- Orgilus moldavicus Tobias, 1986
- Orgilus momphae Muesebeck, 1970
- Orgilus mongolicus Taeger, 1989
- Orgilus monticola Muesebeck, 1970
- Orgilus morulus Muesebeck, 1970
- Orgilus Muesebecki Taeger, 1989
- Orgilus mundus Muesebeck, 1970
- Orgilus neotropicus van Achterberg, 1987
- Orgilus nepalensis Taeger, 1989
- Orgilus niger Penteado-Dias, 1999
- Orgilus nigripennis (Dahl, 1912)
- Orgilus nigromaculatus Cameron, 1906
- Orgilus nitidiceps Taeger, 1989
- Orgilus nitidior Taeger, 1989
- Orgilus nitidus Marshall, 1898
- Orgilus normplatnicki Sharkey, 2021
- Orgilus notabilis Muesebeck, 1970
- Orgilus obesus Taeger, 1989
- Orgilus obscurator (Nees, 1812)
- Orgilus oehlkei Taeger, 1989
- Orgilus opacus Muesebeck, 1970
- Orgilus oregonensis Muesebeck, 1970
- Orgilus ortrudae Taeger, 1989
- Orgilus Pappianus Taeger, 1987
- Orgilus parallelus Muesebeck, 1970
- Orgilus parcus Turner, 1922
- Orgilus parvipennis Thomson, 1895
- Orgilus patzaki Taeger, 1989
- Orgilus pedalis Muesebeck, 1970
- Orgilus perplexus Taeger, 1989
- Orgilus persimilis Muesebeck, 1970
- Orgilus peterrauchi Sharkey, 2021
- Orgilus pimpinellae Niezabitowski, 1910
- Orgilus planus Chou, 1995
- Orgilus podus Braet & van Achterberg, 2001
- Orgilus politus Muesebeck, 1970
- Orgilus ponticus Tobias, 1986
- Orgilus pratensis Muesebeck, 1970
- Orgilus priesneri Fischer, 1958
- Orgilus prolixus Muesebeck, 1970
- Orgilus proprius Muesebeck, 1970
- Orgilus pulcher (Szepligeti, 1905)
- Orgilus pumilus Muesebeck, 1970
- Orgilus punctatus (Beyr, 1959)
- Orgilus punctiventris Tobias, 1976
- Orgilus punctulator (Nees, 1812)
- Orgilus pusillus Szepligeti, 1913
- Orgilus quadricolor Braet & van Achterberg, 2001
- Orgilus radialis Jakimavicius, 1972
- Orgilus rarus Chou, 1995
- Orgilus rasilis Muesebeck, 1970
- Orgilus reclinatus Braet & van Achterberg, 2000
- Orgilus resplendens Taeger, 1989
- Orgilus richardprimacki Sharkey, 2021
- Orgilus rostratus Muesebeck, 1970
- Orgilus rubrator (Ratzeburg, 1852)
- Orgilus rubriceps (Ashmead, 1894)
- Orgilus rudolphae Tobias, 1976
- Orgilus rufigaster Tobias, 1964
- Orgilus rugosus (Nees, 1834)
- Orgilus sandraberriosae Sharkey, 2021
- Orgilus saponariellae Taeger, 1989
- Orgilus sarahmirandae Sharkey, 2021
- Orgilus scottmilleri Sharkey, 2021
- Orgilus scottmorii Sharkey, 2021
- Orgilus setosus van Achterberg, 1987
- Orgilus seyrigi Granger, 1949
- Orgilus Sharkeyi Taeger, 1989
- Orgilus similis Szepligeti, 1896
- Orgilus simillimus Taeger, 1989
- Orgilus simulator Muesebeck, 1970
- Orgilus solidus Muesebeck, 1970
- Orgilus spasskensis Belokobylskij & Taeger, 1996
- Orgilus sticticus Taeger, 1989
- Orgilus striatus Muesebeck, 1970
- Orgilus strigosus Muesebeck, 1970
- Orgilus sudzuchae Belokobylskij & Taeger, 1996
- Orgilus sumatranus (Enderlein, 1912)
- Orgilus swezeyi Fullaway, 1956
- Orgilus szelenyii Papp, 1981
- Orgilus taiwanensis Chou, 1995
- Orgilus temporalis Tobias, 1976
- Orgilus tenuis Muesebeck, 1970
- Orgilus tersus Muesebeck, 1970
- Orgilus thomsoni Taeger, 1989
- Orgilus tibialis (Enderlein, 1912)
- Orgilus Tobiasi Taeger, 1989
- Orgilus transversus van Achterberg, 1987
- Orgilus tristis Taeger, 1989
- Orgilus turgus Papp, 1981
- Orgilus turkmenus Telenga, 1933
- Orgilus utahensis Muesebeck, 1970
- Orgilus validus Muesebeck, 1970
- Orgilus vallis Muesebeck, 1970
- Orgilus vasici Brajkovic, 1987
- Orgilus viduus Taeger, 1989
- Orgilus walleyi Muesebeck, 1970
- Orgilus westermanni (Enderlein, 1912)
- Orgilus woldai van Achterberg, 1987
- Orgilus zonalis Muesebeck, 1970
- Orgilus zuluanus (Turner, 1927)
