= Nudopella =

Scientific classification
- Kingdom: Animalia
- Phylum: Arthropoda
- Clade: Pancrustacea
- Class: Insecta
- Order: Diptera
- Family: Sphaeroceridae
- Genus: Trachyopella
- Subgenus: Nudopella; Roháček & Marshall, 1986

Type species
- Limosina leucoptera Haliday, 1836

Subgenus of flies

Nudopella is a subgenus of flies belonging to the family Sphaeroceridae.

== Species ==
- T. collinella (Richards, 1946)
- T. hem Roháček & Marshall, 1986
- T. leucoptera (Haliday, 1836)
- T. operta Roháček & Marshall, 1986
