= Trachyopella =

Scientific classification
- Kingdom: Animalia
- Phylum: Arthropoda
- Class: Insecta
- Order: Diptera
- Family: Sphaeroceridae
- Subfamily: Limosininae
- Genus: Trachyopella; Duda, 1918

Type species
- Limosina melania Haliday, 1836

Synonyms
- Trachyops Rondani, 1880; Insulomyia Papp, 1972; Minuscula Roháček & Marshall, 1986

Genus of flies

Trachyopella is a genus of flies belonging to the family Sphaeroceridae.

== Species ==
Subgenus Nudopella Roháček & Marshall, 1986

- T. collinella (Richards, 1946)
- T. hem Roháček & Marshall, 1986
- T. leucoptera (Haliday, 1836)
- T. operta Roháček & Marshall, 1986

Subgenus Trachyopella Duda, 1918

- T. aposterna Marshall in Marshall & Montagnes, 1990
- T. apotarsata Marshall in Marshall & Montagnes, 1990
- T. artivena Roháček & Marshall, 1986
- T. atomus (Rondani, 1880)
- T. binuda Roháček & Marshall, 1986
- T. bovilla Collin, 1954
- T. brachystoma (Papp, 1972)
- T. brevisectoris Marshall in Marshall & Montagnes, 1990
- T. coprina (Duda, 1918)
- T. folkei Roháček, 1990
- T. formosae (Duda, 1925)
- T. hardyi (Tenorio, 1967)
- T. hyalinervis (Duda, 1925)
- T. kuntzei (Duda, 1918)
- T. lineafrons (Spuler, 1925)
- T. luteocera Marshall in Marshall & Montagnes, 1990
- T. melania (Haliday, 1836)
- T. microps (Papp, 1972)
- T. minuscula Collin, 1956
- T. mitis Roháček & Marshall, 1986
- T. novaeguineae (Papp, 1972)
- T. nuda Roháček & Marshall, 1986
- T. pannosa Roháček & Marshall, 1986
- T. pectamera Roháček & Marshall, 1986
- T. pedimera Marshall in Marshall & Montagnes, 1990
- T. perparva (Williston, 1896)
- T. senaria Roháček & Marshall, 1986
- T. straminea Roháček & Marshall, 1986
- T. vockerothi Marshall in Marshall & Montagnes, 1990
