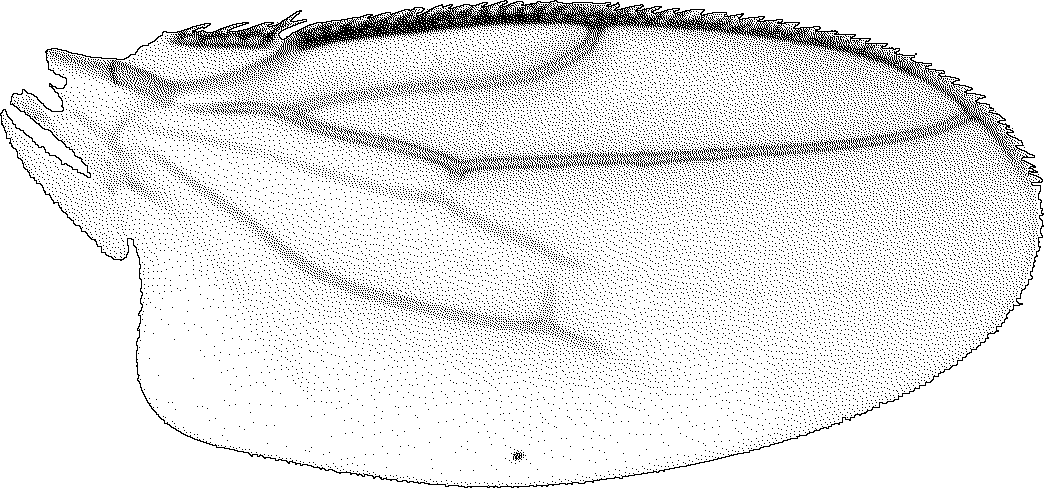

Scientific classification
- Kingdom: Animalia
- Phylum: Arthropoda
- Class: Insecta
- Order: Diptera
- Family: Sphaeroceridae
- Genus: Pullimosina
- Species: P. pullula

Binomial name
- Pullimosina pullula (Zetterstedt, 1847)

Synonyms
- Limosina pullula Zetterstedt, 1847

= Pullimosina pullula =

Species of fly

Pullimosina pullula is a species of lesser dung fly in the family Sphaeroceridae. It is found in Europe.
