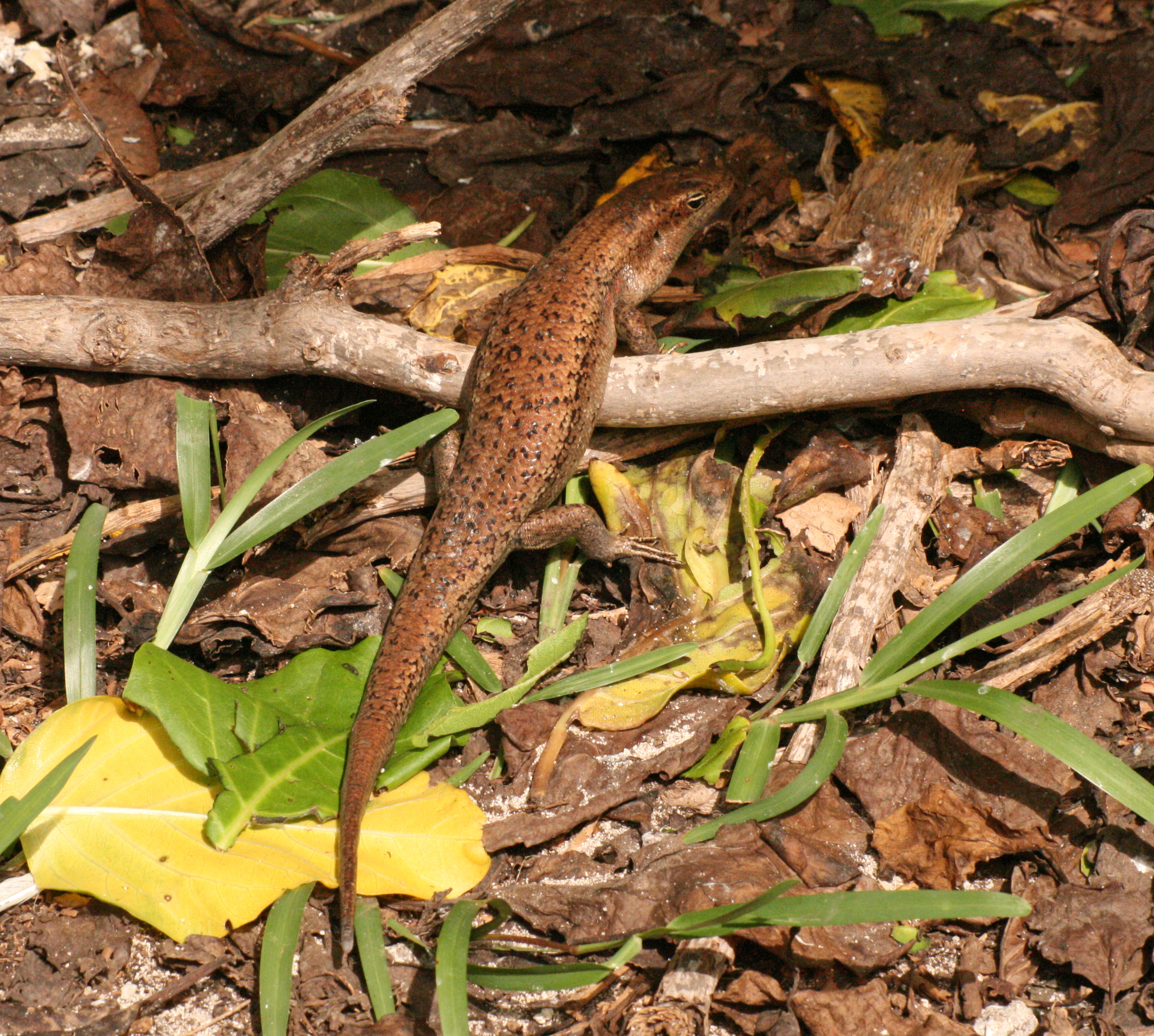
- Trachylepis wrightii

Conservation status
- Vulnerable (IUCN 3.1)

Scientific classification
- Kingdom: Animalia
- Phylum: Chordata
- Class: Reptilia
- Order: Squamata
- Family: Scincidae
- Genus: Trachylepis
- Species: T. wrightii

Binomial name
- Trachylepis wrightii (Boulenger, 1887)
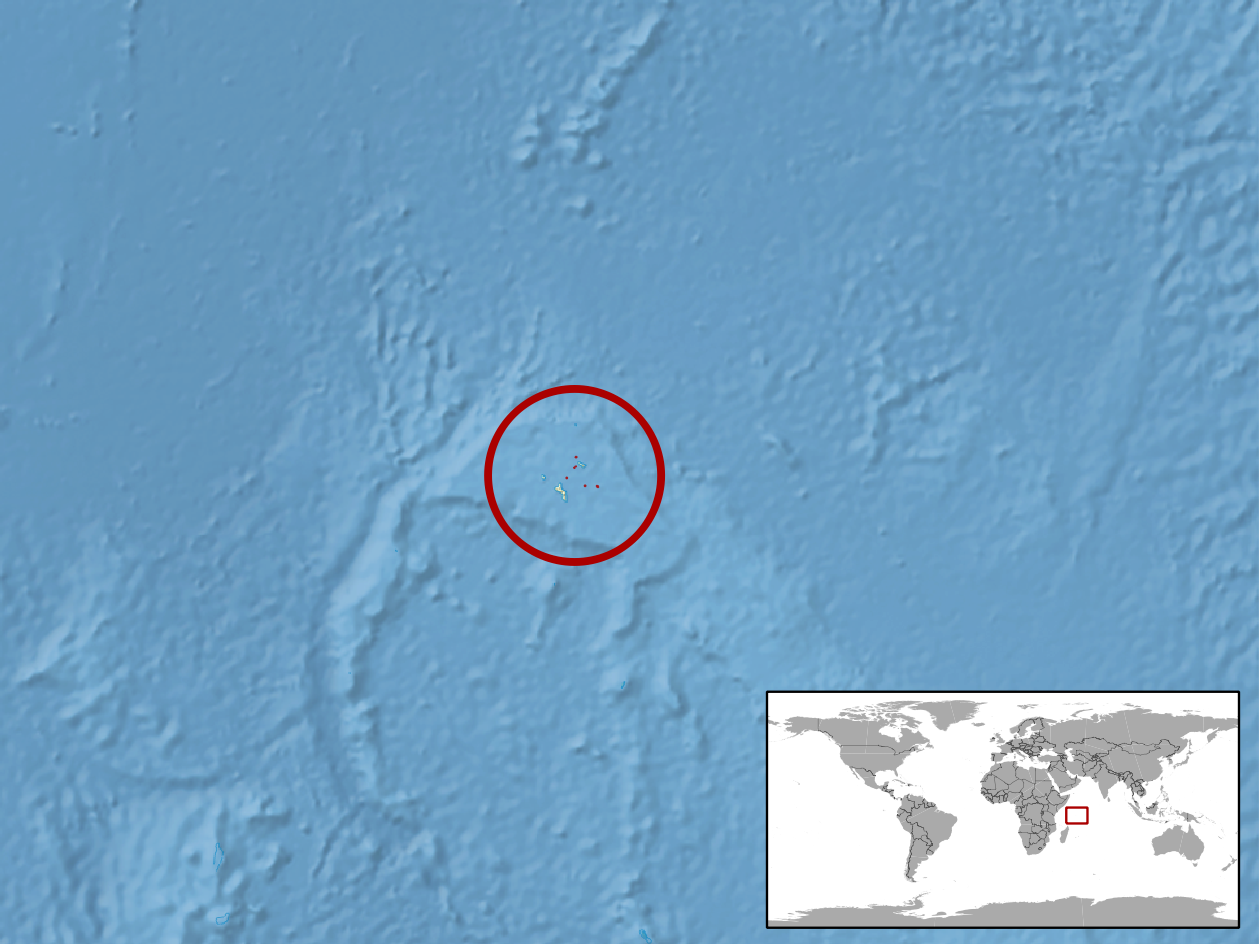

Synonyms
- Mabuia wrightii Boulenger, 1887; Mabuya wrightii — Rendahl, 1939; Trachylepis wrightii — Hedges, 2012

= Wright's skink =

Species of lizard

Wright's skink (Trachylepis wrightii), also known commonly as Wright's mabuya, is a species of lizard in the family Scincidae. The species is endemic to Seychelles. There are two recognized subspecies.

== Etymology ==
The specific name, wrightii, is in honor of Irish naturalist Edward Perceval Wright.

== Geographic range ==
T. wrightii is found only in Seychelles.

== Habitat ==
The natural habitats of T. wrightii are subtropical or tropical dry forests and subtropical or tropical dry shrubland.

== Description ==
Large and heavy-bodied for its genus, T. wrightii may attain a snout-to-vent length (SVL) of about 14 cm (5.5 in).

== Reproduction ==
The mode of reproduction of T. wrightii is unknown.

== Subspecies ==
Two subspecies are recognized as being valid, including the nominotypical subspecies.

- Trachylepis wrightii ilotensis (Rendahl, 1939)
- Trachylepis wrightii wrightii (Boulenger, 1887)
