= Circumscription (taxonomy) =

Definition of a taxon

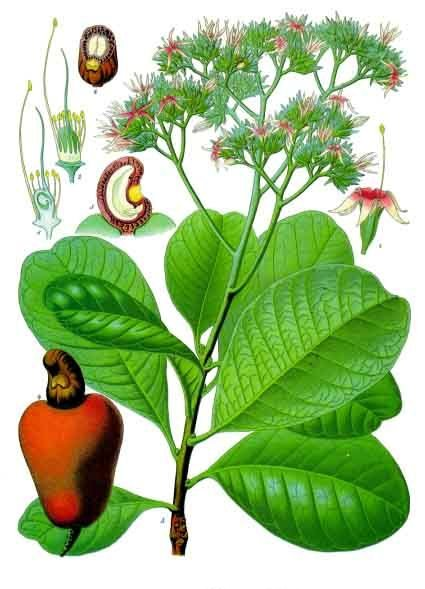
In biological taxonomy, circumscription is the content of a taxon, that is, the delimitation of which subordinate taxa are parts of that taxon. This Anacardium occidentale is in a family with unstable circumscription (refer to text for details).

In biological taxonomy, circumscription is the content of a taxon, that is, the delimitation of which subordinate taxa are parts of that taxon. For example, if it is determined that species X, Y, and Z belong in genus A, and species T, U, V, and W belong in genus B, those are the circumscriptions of those two genera. Another systematist might determine that T, U, V, W, X, Y, and Z all belong in genus A. Agreement on circumscriptions is not governed by the codes of zoological or botanical nomenclature, and must be reached by scientific consensus.

A goal of biological taxonomy is to achieve a stable circumscription for every taxon. This goal conflicts, at times, with the goal of achieving a natural classification that reflects the evolutionary history of divergence of groups of organisms. Balancing these two goals is a work in progress, and the circumscriptions of many taxa that had been regarded as stable for decades are in upheaval in the light of rapid developments in molecular phylogenetics. New evidence may suggest that a traditional circumscription should be revised, particularly if the old circumscription is shown to be paraphyletic (a group containing some but not all of the descendants of the common ancestor).

For example, the family Pongidae contained orangutans (Pongo), chimpanzees (Pan) and gorillas (Gorilla), but not humans (Homo), which are placed in Hominidae. Once molecular phylogenetic data showed that chimpanzees were more closely related to humans than to gorillas or orangutans, it became clear that Pongidae is a paraphyletic group, and the circumscription of Hominidae was changed to include all four extant genera of great apes.

Sometimes, systematists propose novel circumscriptions that do not address paraphyly. For example, the broadly circumscribed monophyletic moth superfamily Pyraloidea can be split into two families, Pyralidae and Crambidae, which are reciprocally monophyletic sister taxa.

An example of a botanical group with unstable circumscription is Anacardiaceae, a family of flowering plants. Some experts favor a circumscription in which this family includes the Blepharocaryaceae, Julianaceae, and Podoaceae, which are sometimes considered to be separate families.

== See also ==
- Glossary of scientific naming
- Circumscriptional name
