= Natural History Review =

- Discipline: Natural history
- Language: English

Publication details
- History: 1854-1865

Standard abbreviations
- ISO 4: Nat. Hist. Rev.

Links
- Journal homepage

The Natural History Review was a short-lived, quarterly journal devoted to natural history. It was published in Dublin and London between 1854 and 1865.

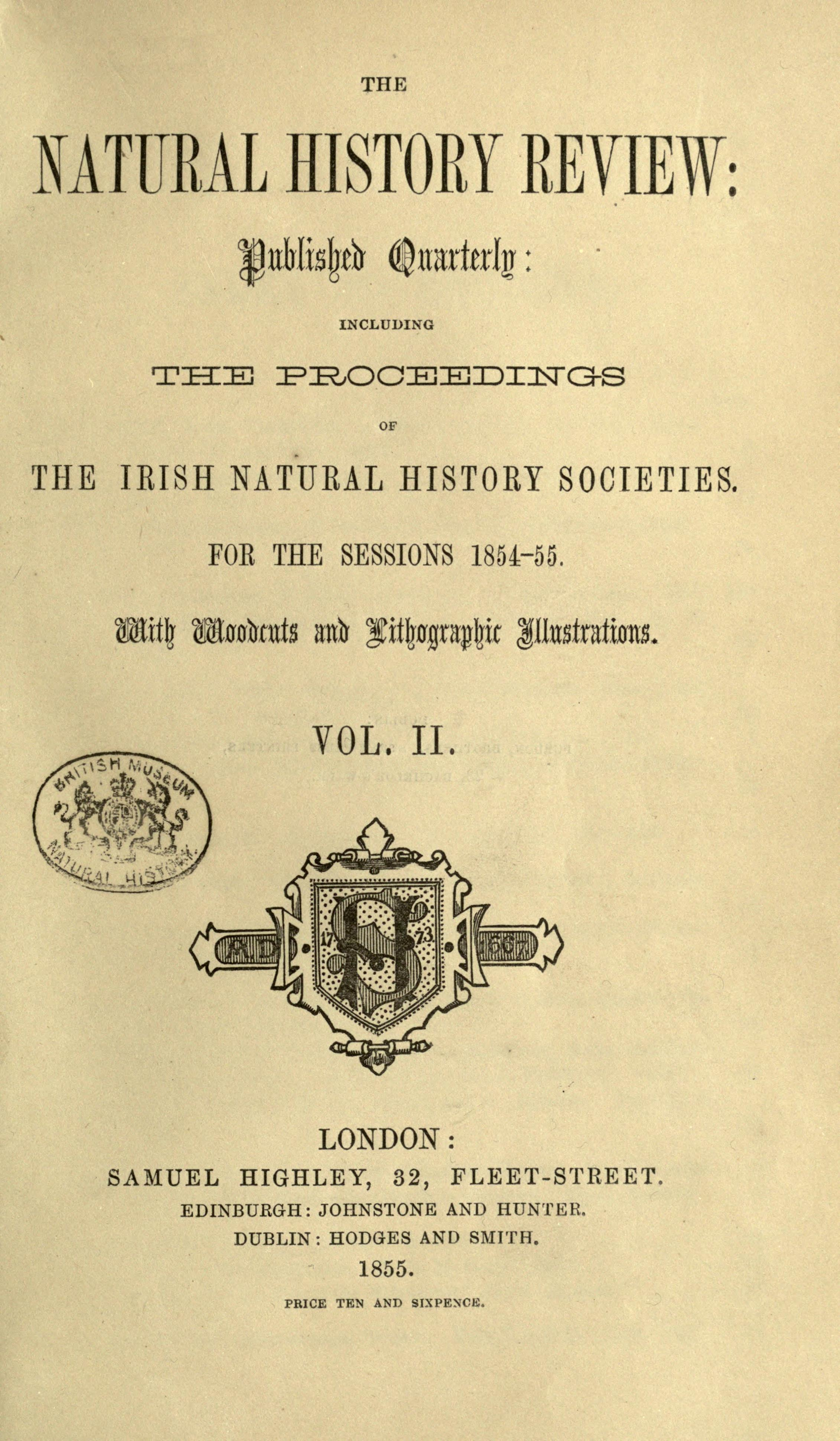

The Natural History Review included the transactions of the Belfast Natural History and Philosophical Society, Cork Cuvierian Society, Dublin Natural History Society, Dublin University Zoological Association, and the Literary and Scientific Institution of Kilkenny, as authorised...It was founded by Edward Perceval Wright who was also the editor.

The parts are:

Vols 1-4, 1854–57; title concludes: ...by the Councils of these Societies (Geological Society of Dublin later added to list)

This was continued as Natural History Review, and quarterly journal of science. Edited by Edward Percival Wright, William Henry Harvey, Joseph Reay Greene, Samuel Haughton and Alexander Henry Haliday London, Vols 5-7, 1858-60.

In turn continued as Natural History Review: a quarterly journal of biological science. Edited by George Busk, William Benjamin Carpenter, Frederick Currey et al., London, Vols 1-5, 1861–65; no more published.
