= A Guide to the Arrangement of British Insects =

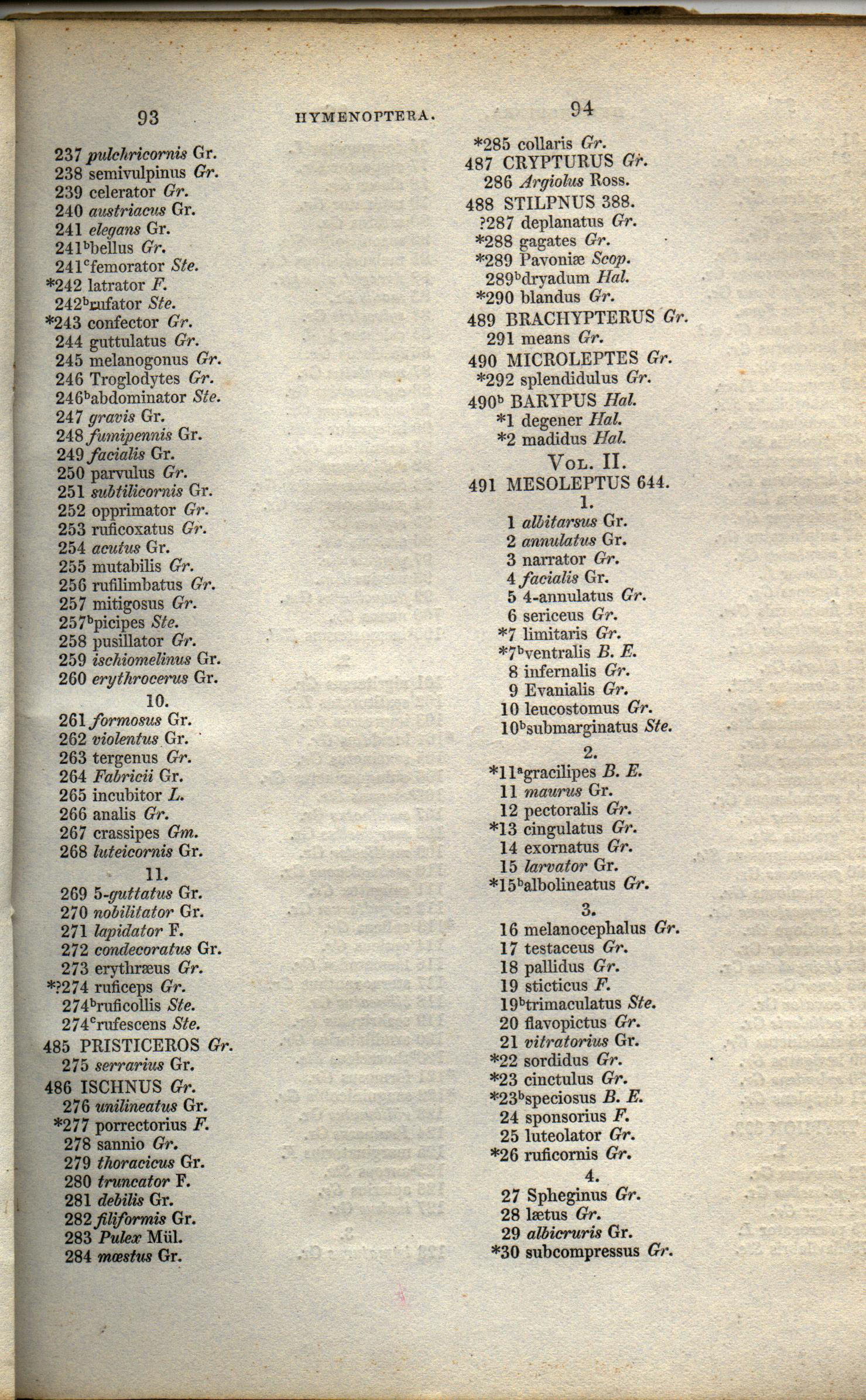
Page from the Guide

A guide to the arrangement of British insects is a seminal work of entomology. A monumental piece of work with over 10,000 insect names it was intended for the author's own use, but pressure for publication grew until it appeared in 1829. Uniquely for its time, all insect orders were included. A second was published in 1837.

Six pages of introductory matter are followed by 282 columns of insect names in two columns per page systematically arranged and followed by an index to genera. This work attributed to John Curtis was in fact co-authored by James Charles Dale, Francis Walker and Alexander Henry Haliday; Haliday and Walker writing almost the whole of the sections on Diptera and parasitic Hymenoptera. The list contains 1500 generic and 15,000 specific names. Ireland and Britain are not separated.

The full title is A guide to the arrangement of British insects; being a catalogue of all the named species hitherto discovered in Great Britain and Ireland. According to the preface, the Guide had five purposes for entomologists:

- 1st. It will enable them to arrange their Cabinets systematically.
- 2ndly. They may mark off their own Insects so as to know instantly whether they have a species or not, by which means their desiderata will be shown; and this the Author is persuaded will enable Students to enrich their Cabinets by mutual exchanges to an extent which could not be accomplished by any other means.
- 3rdly. It will form Labels for Cabinets.
- 4thly. It will be a systematic Index to "The British Entomology", a reference being given to every Genus already illustrated, and may be easily continued by those who are desirous of completing it.
- 5thly. It will be a Catalogue of the Author's Cabinet, those without a * being his desiderata, and of those with a ‡ he has only foreign specimens. The names in italics denote insects which are doubtful natives.

The Guide was the subject of a celebrated quarrel between James Francis Stephens and John Curtis.
