= Joseph Reay Greene =

Irish professor of Natural History

Joseph Reay Greene (1836–1903) was an Irish zoologist.

Between 1858 and 1877 Reay Greene was Professor of Natural History in Queen's College, Cork. He was one of the Editors of the Natural History Review. He was a specialist in Hydrozoa.

== Works ==
Partial list

- 1857. On the Acalephae of Dublin coast, with description of seven new nakedeyed forms. Natural History Review, Proceedings of Societies 4: 242–250.
- 1869 Manual of the Coelenterata. 8vo. London
- 1859 With Edward Perceval Wright 1859 Report on the marine fauna of the south and west coasts of Ireland. Report for the British Association for the Advancement of Science : 176–181.
