= Chaetopodella (Afrochaetopodella) =

Scientific classification
- Kingdom: Animalia
- Phylum: Arthropoda
- Clade: Pancrustacea
- Class: Insecta
- Order: Diptera
- Family: Sphaeroceridae
- Genus: Chaetopodella
- Subgenus: Afrochaetopodella; Papp, 2008

Type species
- Chaetopodella reducta Papp, 2008

Subgenus of flies

Afrochaetopodella is a subgenus of flies belonging to the family Sphaeroceridae.

== Species ==
- Chaetopodella keniaca Papp, 2008
- Chaetopodella reducta Papp, 2008
