= Dublin University Zoological Association =

The Dublin University Zoological Association was founded in 1853 to promote zoological studies in Ireland. Dublin University is now Trinity College Dublin.

It commenced proceedings in the Natural History Review in 1854.

== Notable members ==
- Robert Ball
- Edward Perceval Wright
- George Henry Kinahan
- Robert Warren
- William Archer
- Samuel Haughton
- George James Allman
- Alexander Henry Haliday
