= Circumscriptional name =

Circumscriptional names (Latin: nomina circumscribentia) are taxon names that are defined by their circumscription; i.e. the diagnostic feature of the particular set of members included. Such names are not ruled by any nomenclature code and are mainly for taxa above the rank of family (e.g. order or class), but can be used for taxa of any rank or unranked taxa.

Non-typified names other than those of genus or species rank constitute the majority of generally accepted names of taxa higher than superfamily. The standard nomenclature codes regulate names of taxa up to family rank (i.e. superfamily). There are no generally accepted rules for the naming of higher taxa (orders, classes, phyla, etc.). Under the approach of circumscription-based (circumscriptional) nomenclatures, a circumscriptional name is associated with a certain circumscription of a taxon without regard of its rank or position.

In contrast to circumscriptional nomenclature, some authors advocate introducing a mandatory standardized typified nomenclature of higher taxa. They suggest all names of higher taxa to be derived in the same manner as family-group names, by modifying names of type genera with suffixes to reflect the rank. There is no consensus on what such higher rank suffixes should be. A number of established practices exist as to the use of typified names of higher taxa, depending on group of organisms.

== See also ==
- Descriptive botanical name, optional forms still used in botany for ranks above family and for a few family names
