= James Charles Dale =

English naturalist (1791-1872)

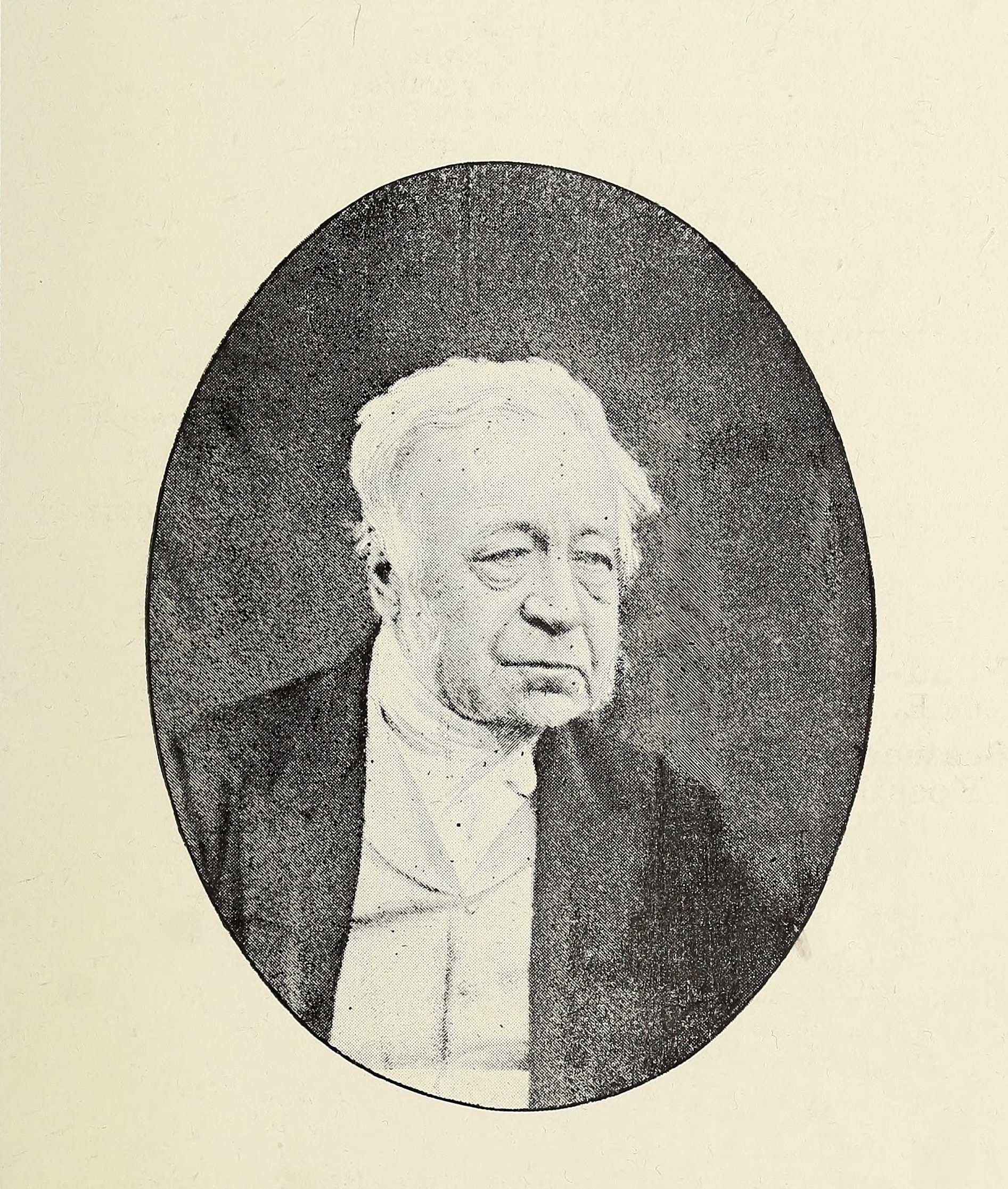
- Mr J C Dale
- Born: 13 December 1791; Iwerne Minster, Dorset
- Died: 6 February 1872 (aged 80)
- Occupation: Naturalist
- Years active: ~1800 to 1872
- Notable work: Oxford's Dalean Collection

James Charles Dale (13 December 1791 – 6 February 1872) was an English naturalist who devoted almost all of his adult life to entomology.

== Family ==
Dale was the only son of Dorset landowner James Dale of Glanvilles Wootton and his wife, Mary Kelloway Barton. Late in life, 28 December 1848, at Eltham Kent he married for the first time Lucy Marianne (1821–1875), eldest sister of Dr Henry Wylde. She is reported to have accompanied him on some of his expeditions. They were to have two sons, Charles William Dale (1851–1906) best known as a lepidopterist and dipterist but he also published notes on other insects including coleoptera, and Edward Robert Dale (1853–1903) who described himself as an entomologist and electrical engineer when the use of electricity was still in its infancy.

== Career ==
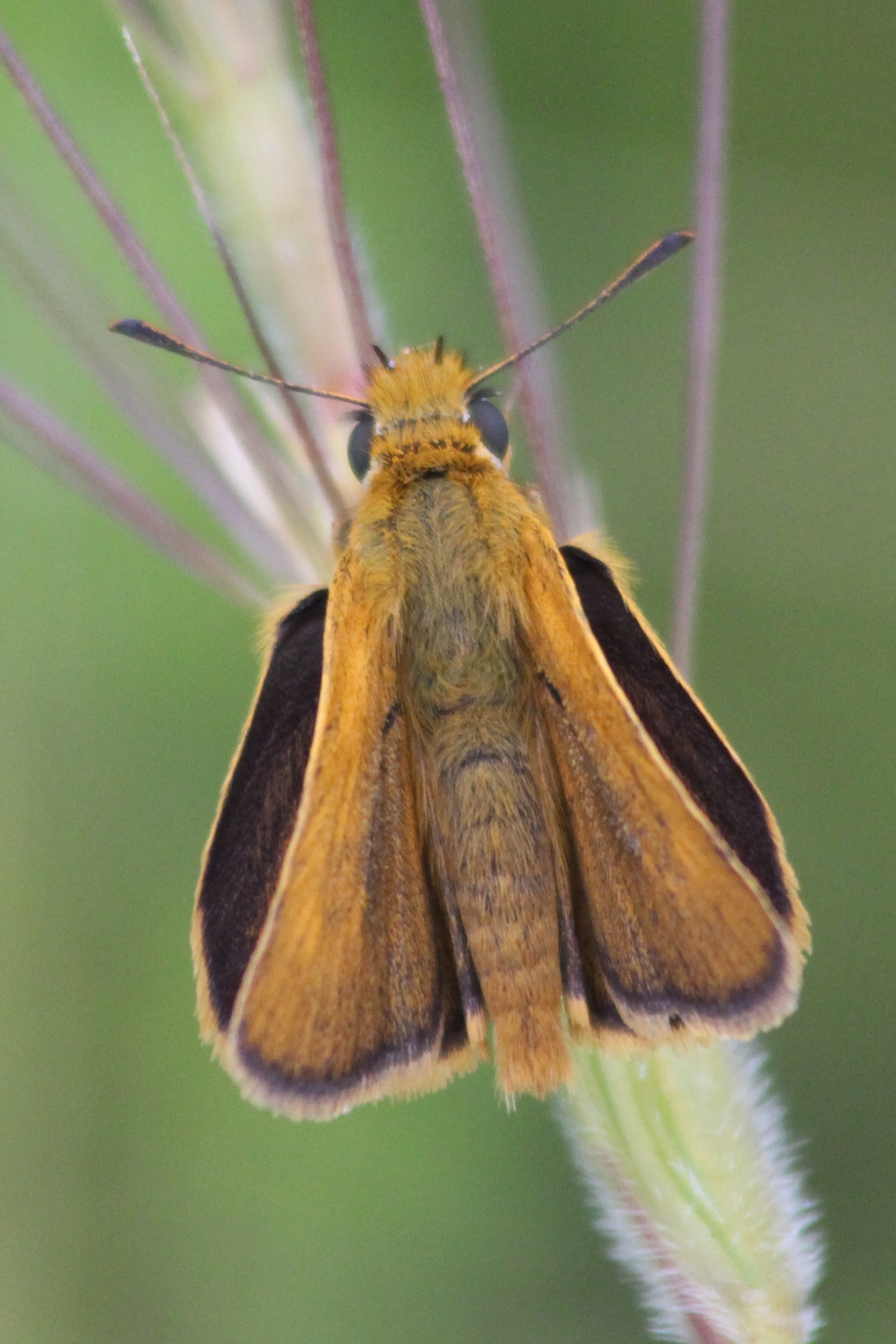
Lulworth skipper

Dale received his education at Wimborne Grammar School and Sidney Sussex College Cambridge University receiving his MA in 1818. He was a magistrate. On one occasion a cloud of butterflies was released into Dale's magistrate court. His most famous discovery was the Lulworth skipper.

He was a friend of James Francis Stephens, frequently mentioned in that author's Illustrations of British Entomology and of John Curtis who refers to him frequently in his British Entomology. Another close friend was the Irish entomologist Alexander Henry Haliday. The references are mainly to Coleoptera though Dale worked on all Orders.

His first note, on Lepidoptera was published, in the Magazine of Natural History in 1830. This was followed by some 83 further notes and articles covering a wide range of topics.

He was elected a member of the first Entomological Society of London on 25 June 1822. He was appointed High Sheriff of Dorset for 1843.

== Collections ==
Dale's collection is in the Hope Department of Entomology.The Dalean collection was housed in 33 cabinets when it was received at Oxford in 1906, of which five cabinets were devoted to Coleoptera. Included in the latter are four drawers of Thomas Vernon Wollaston beetles from Madeira, Cape Verde, Canary Islands and St. Helena. It is still housed separately from the main collections. Dale's manuscripts and notebooks are in the Hope Library.

== Works ==
Partial list

- 1834- The authorship of many insects described by Dale in British Entomology is often given to Curtis, however it is clearly stated by Curtis that the authorship is Dale's and from "Dale MSS"
- 1834 A List of the more rare of the Species of Insects found on Parley Heath, on the Borders of Hampshire Loudon's Magazine of Natural History.
- 1841 Beris Morrisii of Curtis's Guide Entomologist. 1(1840–1842): 175-
- 1842. Descriptions, &c. of a few rare or undescribed species of British Diptera, principally from the collection of J. C. Dale, Esq., M. A., F. L. S., &c. Ann. Mag. Nat. Hist. 8: 430–433.
- Dale, J.C. 1863. Miscellaneous captures near Tenby. The Weekly Entomologist, 2: 262–263.
- Catalogue of the Coleopterous Insects of Dorsetshire', in Nat., 2, 1837, pp. 408–415, and 3, 1838, pp. 12–18.
