= John Curtis (entomologist) =

English entomologist and illustrator

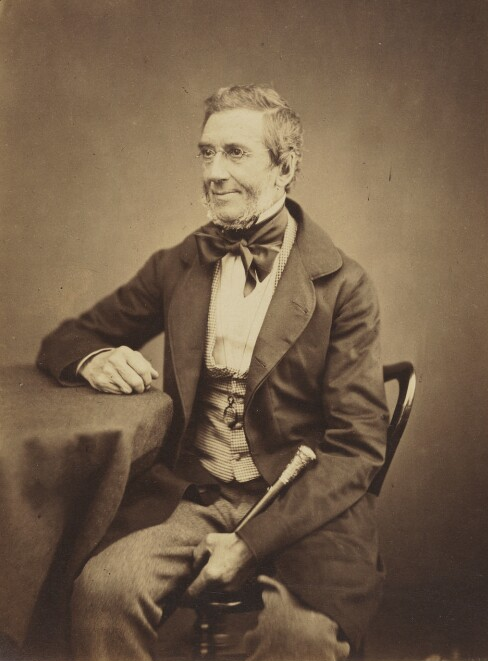
- Born: 3 December 1791; Norwich, Norfolk, East of England
- Died: 6 October 1862 (aged 71); Islington, London
- Scientific career
- Fields: Entomology

John Curtis (3 September 1791 – 6 October 1862) was an English entomologist and illustrator.

== Biography ==
Curtis was born in Norwich to Frances and Charles Morgan Curtis. Charles Morgan died before his son had reached the age of 4. His mother, Frances, had a passion for flowers and was a professional flower grower. She encouraged her son to study natural history with a young local naturalist, Richard Walker (1791–1870). At the age of 16 John became an apprentice at a local lawyer's office in Norwich but devoted his spare time to studying and drawing insects and, with insect collecting becoming a growing craze, he found he could make a living selling the specimens he found. At this time he became a friend of Simon Wilkin (1790–1862) a wealthy land owner in Norfolk, eventually leaving his job to live with Wilkin at Cossey Hall where the extensive natural history library and specimen collection afforded him the opportunity to study his emerging over-riding passion, entomology. Through Wilkin he met the entomologists William Kirby and William Spence.

In pursuit of his passion he learned how to etch and engrave copper plates leading to his first published work, the five coloured plates and twenty uncoloured outline drawings in Kirby and Spence's An Introduction to Entomology (1815–1826).

In 1819 William Kirby accompanied Curtis to London where Curtis met Sir Joseph Banks, president of the Royal Society. Banks introduced him to Sir William Elford Leach superintendent of the Zoological Collection of the British Museum with whom Curtis studied conchology. Leach, in turn, introduced him to James Charles Dale who soon became his patron.

In 1824 Curtis began his monumental masterwork, British Entomology: Being Illustrations and Descriptions of the Genera of Insects Found in Great Britain and Ireland, still widely considered as the finest nineteenth century work on the subject. It was published in monthly parts by subscription from 1824 to 1839, each part comprising 3 or more plates with descriptive texts ranging from usually 2 to as many as 10 pages. The finished work comprised 16 volumes each of 12 parts, 192 parts in all together with 770 plates (1 to 769 plus 205*), available either coloured or plain. Georges Cuvier (1769–1832) described the illustrations of British Entomology as "the paragon of perfection".

More complete details of his professional career are given in the obituary published by the Linnaean Society in 1862 (below).

By 1840 Curtis's eyesight was beginning to fail, worsening with time until it began to cause him financial problems. These were partly solved by publishing a number of entomological articles in the Gardener's Chronicle, as "Ruricola", and in the Journal of the Royal Agricultural Society. This led to the profitable Farm Insects: Being the Natural History and Economy of the Insects Injurious to the Field Crops of Great Britain and Ireland published in 1860.

By the end of 1856 Curtis was totally blind, living at 18 Belitha-villas (now: Belitha Villas), Islington, London and receiving a civil list pension initially of £100 a year but later increased to £150. Many years after his death, when the original drawings for British Entomology were up for sale, there were fears that the precious collection would be split up. The whole collection was, however, purchased by Walter Rothschild and later bequeathed to the Natural History Museum, where they remain today.

He was a Fellow of the Linnaean Society of London from 1822, in 1833. He lent support to the founding of what became the Royal Entomological Society and served as its president from 1855 to 1857. He was an honorary member of the Société entomologique de France.

== Contacts ==
Curtis was a lifelong friend of the Irish entomologist Alexander Henry Haliday and of the London entomologist Francis Walker. Curtis met Haliday in December 1827, (following an exchange of letters and specimens) Curtis's second child was named Henry Alexander and Haliday was his godfather.

I was delighted to possess Ceraphron Halidayii first because I had named it after you.... it is very essential to possess those insects I figure: the female of Scatophaga also was a most valuable addition. Tipula dispar I only had the male of, I never could understand the female but thought it had been killed before the wings were fully expanded, never having taken it myself and I need scarcely say there was not an insect you sent me that was not fully acceptable ...... I will put into the box some British Ichneumonidae hoping you will do me the favour at your leisure to append to them their Generic names and if you know them the specific also but not to take any trouble about it and whenever there are 2 alike I beg you will take one if desirable. Pray do me the favour to answer the different questions in this letter as I have no copy or memorandum. I shall hope to hear shortly from you and sincerely wishing you in a good old English Phrase a Merry Christmas and Happy New Year. Yours most faithfully, John Curtis

— Curtis to Haliday 22 December 1832.

"To Alexander Henry Haliday, Esq., M.A., &c, of Belfast, whose extensive knowledge and munificent contributions, have so greatly enriched this work and whose kindness and friendship in its progress have been an uninterrupted source of gratification, to the author, this volume" (British Entomology VII Homoptera. Hemiptera. Aphaniptera) is dedicated as a token of sincere regard...

— London 1 December 1837.

It has for several years been my wish to pay you the only public testimony in my power of my regard by dedicating a volume of my work to you. The many and essential services you have rendered that work during its progress would entitle you to such a compliment were you only a correspondent and the numerous proofs I had of your kindness and friend-ship make me only regret that it will not be better with your acceptance. I assure you one of the greatest pleasures in the progress of my great undertaking has been the associating my name with those whom I esteem and who like myself fare devote to the study of our branch of Natural History I may have only two more opportunities of thus gratifying myself and I shall be truly happy if they afford me the same unmixed pleasures as the present one does...

— Curtis to Haliday 2 December 1837.

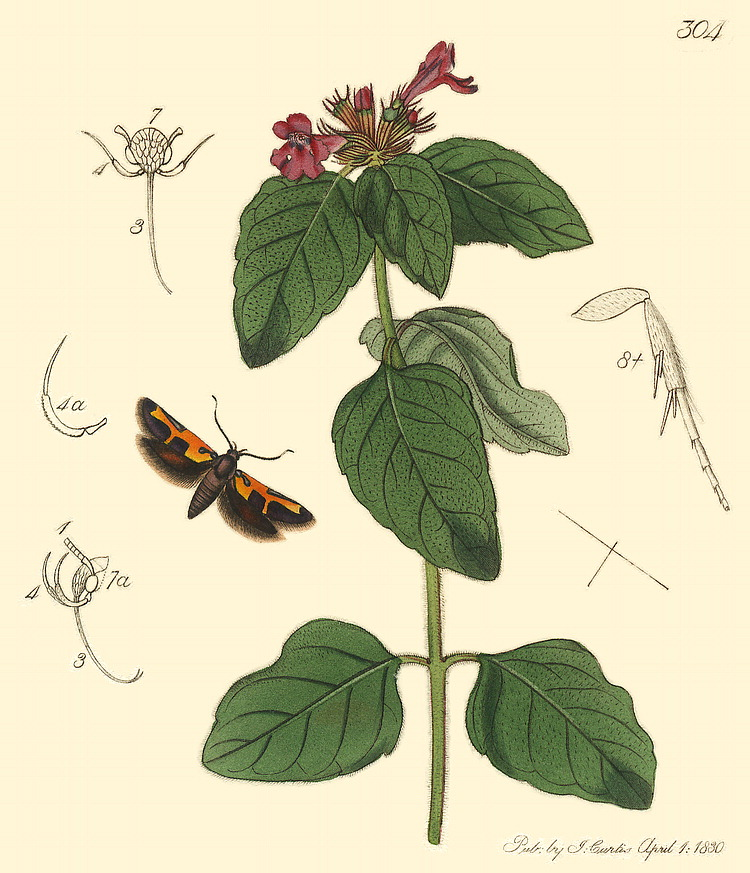
Euclemensia woodiella, the extinct Manchester Tinea (1830). (From British Entomology, a poor quality 1862, lithographic reprint by Lovell Reeves).

== Selected works ==
- 1 January 1824 – 1 December 1839: First edition of British Entomology comprising detailed description of the insects of Great Britain and Ireland with 770 hand-coloured plates and over 2,000 species described. Issued in 192 monthly parts over 16 years to an initial list of 167 subscribers, yet less than 35 complete copies of the first edition were finally produced. Universally acknowledged as being the finest work concerning British entomology ever produced. The exceptionally fine images included the most accurate botanical illustrations that have yet to be bettered. Note: Title pages incorrectly show publication dates as 1823–1840.
- 1837 second edition of A Guide to the Arrangement of British Insects being a catalogue of all the named species hitherto discovered in Great Britain and Ireland. Six pages of introductory matter are followed by 282 columns of insect names in two columns per page systematically arranged and followed by an index to genera. This work attributed to John Curtis was in fact co-authored by James Charles Dale, Francis Walker and Alexander Henry Haliday; Haliday and Walker writing almost the whole of the sections on Diptera and parasitic Hymenoptera. The list contains 1500 generic and 15,000 specific names. Britain and Ireland are not separated.
- 1860 Farm Insects: Being the Natural History and Economy of the Insects Injurious to the Field Crops of Great Britain and Ireland with Suggestions for Their Destruction Glasgow, Blackie. (See External Links Google Books)

== Collections ==
John Curtis' insect collection is divided between the National Museum of Ireland – Natural History (via Trinity College Dublin, 7,656 specimens purchased by Thomas Coulter) and Museums Victoria in Melbourne, Australia, which purchased the John Curtis Collection of British and Foreign Insects—comprising 38,031 specimens—for £567 in 1862. Museums Victoria also holds the Curtis Agricultural Insect Collection, which documents British agricultural pest insects.
