= George Busk =

British naval surgeon, zoologist and palaeontologist

George Busk FRS FRAI
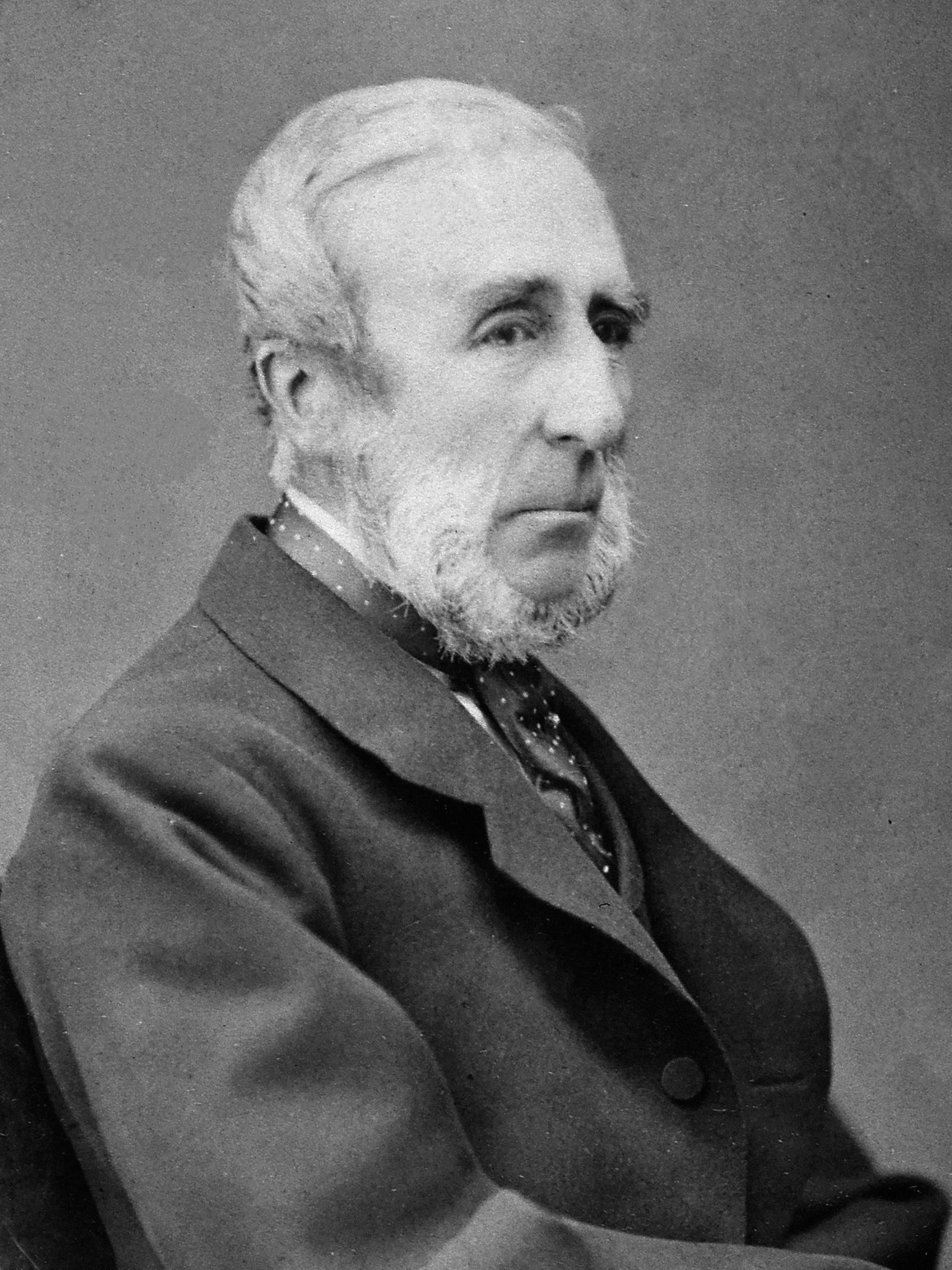
- Born: 12 August 1807; Saint Petersburg, Russian Empire
- Died: 10 August 1886 (aged 78); London, United Kingdom
- Resting place: Kensal Green Cemetery, London; 51.5286°N 0.2241°W
- Occupation: Surgeon
- Title: MRCS Lond. (c.1830); FRCS (1843); FLS (1846); FRS (1850)
- Spouse: Ellen Busk (1843–1886)
- Children: Two daughters
- Awards: Royal Medal (1871); Lyell Medal (1878); Wollaston Medal (1885)

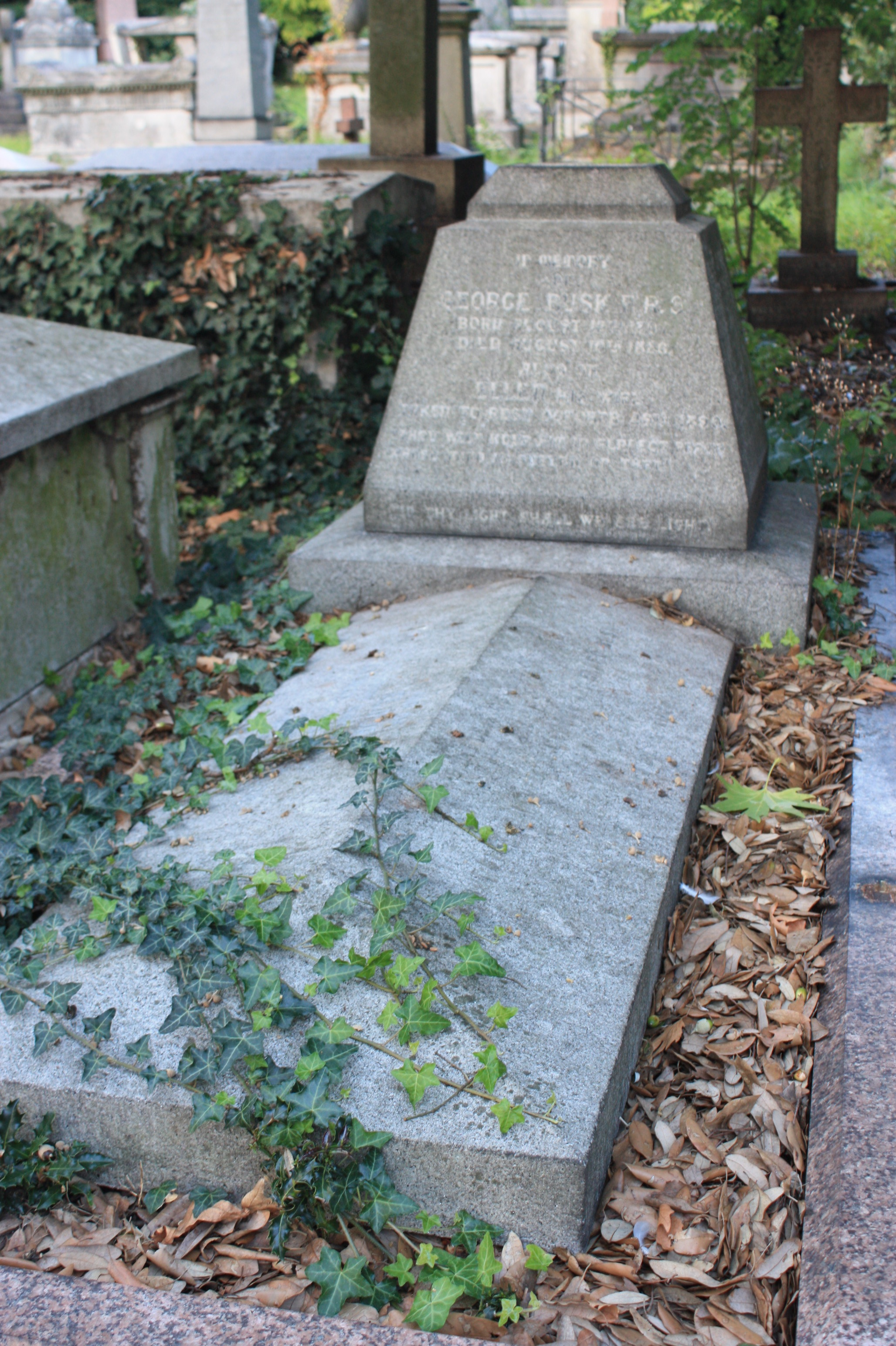
The grave of George Busk, Kensal Green Cemetery

George Busk FRS FRAI (12 August 1807 – 10 August 1886) was a British naval surgeon, zoologist and palaeontologist.

== Early life, family and education ==
Busk was born in St. Petersburg, Russia. He was the son of the merchant Robert Busk and his wife Jane. Robert Busk was the son of Sir Wadsworth Busk, who was an Attorney General of the Isle of Man and grandfather of Anna Jane Busk (1813-1888) whose grandson, William George Lupton (1871-1911), was named in honour of George. Jane Busk's father, John Westly, was Customs House clerk in St. Petersburg.

Busk studied at Dr. Hartley's School in Yorkshire. He studied surgery in London, at both St Thomas' Hospital and for one session at St Bartholomew's Hospital.

== Career ==
Busk was appointed assistant-surgeon to the Greenwich Hospital in 1832. He served as naval surgeon first in HMS Grampus. He later served for many years in HMS Dreadnought, which had fought at Trafalgar. In Busk's time it was used by the Seamen's Hospital Society as a hospital ship for ex-members of the Merchant Navy or fishing fleet and their dependants. During this period Busk made important observations on cholera and on scurvy.

He founded the Greenwich Natural History Society in 1852, serving as its president until 1858.

In 1855, he retired from service and from medicine and settled in London, where he devoted himself mainly to the study of zoology and palaeontology. As early as 1842, he assisted in editing the Microscopical Journal; and later he edited the Quarterly Journal of Microscopical Science (1853–68) and the Natural History Review (1861–65). He was a member of the famous X-Club, founded by T. H. Huxley, which was active in revitalising science in the period 1865–1885. Busk and his wife Ellen were close friends of Huxley. Busk successfully nominated Charles Darwin for the Copley Medal, the highest award of the Royal Society, in 1864.

From 1856 to 1859, he was Hunterian Professor of Comparative Anatomy and Physiology in the Royal College of Surgeons, and he became President of the college in 1871. He was elected Fellow of the Royal Society in 1850. Busk was an active member of the Linnean Society, the Geological Society and president of the Ethnological Society and then the Anthropological Institute (1873–74). He received the Royal Society's Royal Medal and the Geological Society's Wollaston and Lyell medals.

Busk was the leading authority on the Polyzoa; and later the vertebrate remains from caverns and river deposits occupied his attention. In 1862, Busk was again in Gibraltar. He was responsible of bringing to England the Gibraltar skull (the second Neanderthal fossil ever found and the first known adult one) which was excavated at Gibraltar in 1848. The identification of the skull as belonging to a Neanderthal was not made until the 20th century.

== Personal life and demise ==
On 12 August 1843, George Busk married his cousin Ellen, youngest daughter of Jacob Hans Busk. They had two daughters.

He died in London on 10 August 1886 and is buried at Kensal Green Cemetery, London, in the northern section of the central circle.

== Notes ==
Awards
Preceded by James Hector	Lyell Medal; 1878	Succeeded by Edmond Hebert
Preceded by Albert Jean Gaudry	Wollaston Medal; 1885	Succeeded by Alfred Des Cloizeaux
