= Abel Ingpen =

English entomologist (1796–1854)

Abel Ingpen (20 May 1796 in Chelsea – 14 September 1854) was an English entomologist who specialised in Lepidoptera.

He is best known as the author of Instructions for collecting, rearing, and preserving British & foreign insects : also for collecting and preserving crustacea and shells (published by J. Bulcock in 1827 at London). A second edition “edited, with considerable corrections and additions” of this work was published by W. Smith also at London in 1839. Abel Ingpen was an original Member of the Entomological Society of London, a Member of the Microscopical Society of London and an Associate Member of the Linnean Society. He died of cholera.
