= Alexander Henry Haliday =

Irish entomologist (1806–1870)

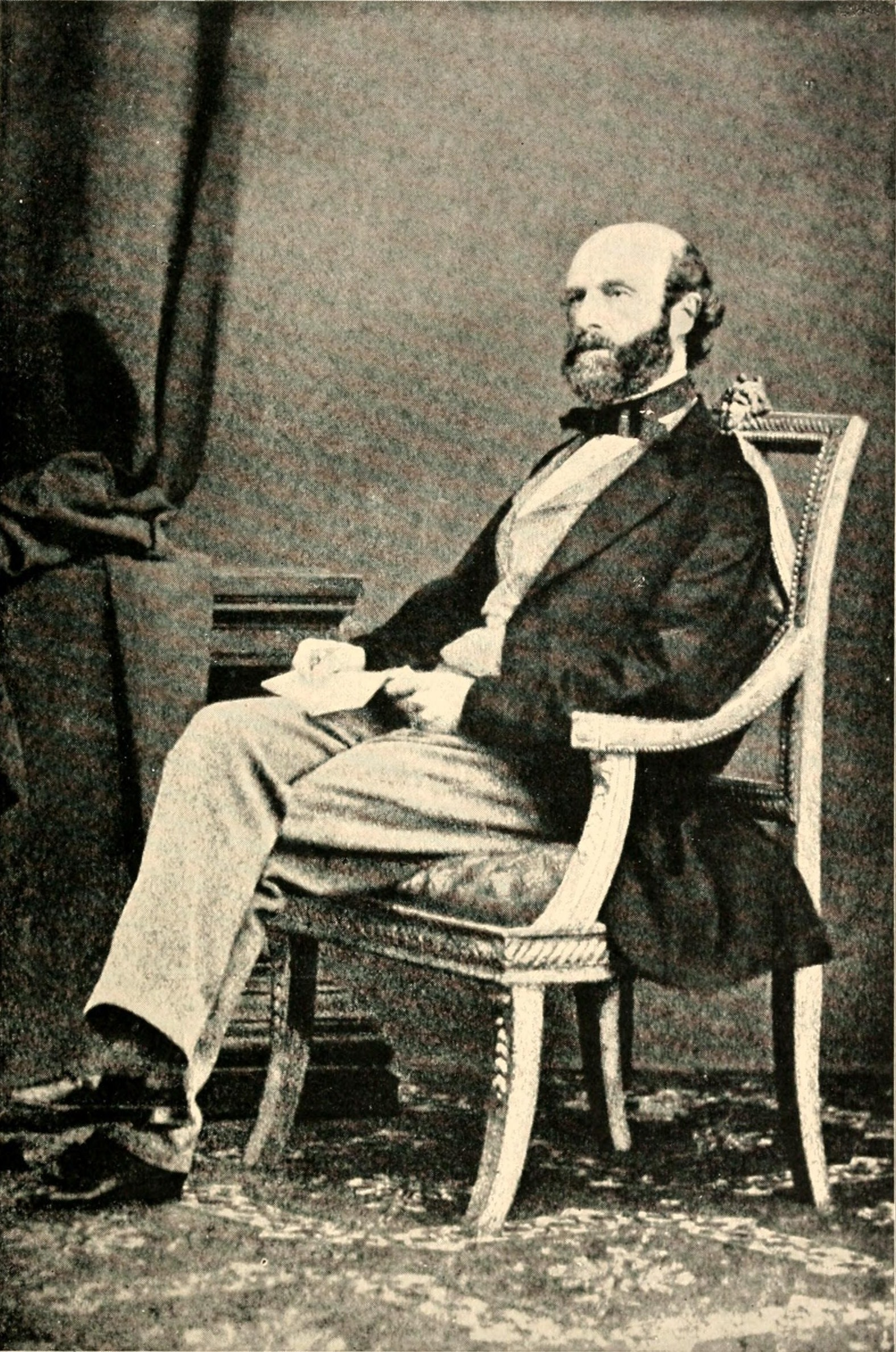
Alexander Henry Haliday

Alexander Henry Haliday (1806–1870, also known as Enrico Alessandro Haliday, Alexis Heinrich Haliday, or simply Haliday) was an Irish entomologist. He is primarily known for his work on Hymenoptera, Diptera, and Thysanoptera, but worked on all insect orders and on many aspects of entomology.

Haliday was born in Carnmoney, County Antrim later living in Holywood, County Down, Ireland. A boyhood friend of Robert Templeton, he divided his time between Ireland and Lucca, where he co-founded the Italian Entomological Society with Camillo Rondani and Adolfo Targioni Tozzetti. He was a member of the Royal Irish Academy, the Belfast Natural History Society, the Microscopical Society of London, and the Galileiana Academy of Arts and Science, as well as a fellow of the (now Royal) Entomological Society of London.

Alexander Haliday was among the greatest dipterists of the 19th century and one of the most renowned British entomologists. His achievements were in four main fields: description, higher taxonomy, synonymy, and biology. He erected many major taxa including the order Thysanoptera and the families Mymaridae and Ichneumonidae.

== Biography ==
=== Early life ===
Alexander Henry Haliday was born in Carnmoney Ireland on 21 November 1806.The family later lived in Holywood, County Down, a small seaside town in County Down in a house named Clifden. He was the eldest child of Dr William Haliday (1763-1836) and Marion Webster. Haliday had a brother named William Robert and a sister named Hortense. His father was the nephew and heir of Dr Alexander Henry Haliday, one of Belfast's best known physicians and political activists. The Haliday family was Protestant, though not religious, and clearly well-placed, holding 3,228 acres (13.06 km^{2}) of farmland in County Antrim valued at £3,054.00 in 1820 (£246,763.20 in 2017). The family also owned properties in Holywood and Dublin and had a cloth merchant business and shipping interests. The Haliday family was related to the wealthy Luccan Pisani family, whom Haliday visited often throughout his life.

=== Education ===
Haliday began his education at the Belfast Academical Institution, a school that had strong leanings towards natural history. Haliday studied Classics when he was twelve, Arithmetic when he was fourteen, and Mathematics when he was sixteen. He learned several other subjects, including natural history from George Crawford Hyndman. Haliday left the Belfast Academical Institution and the family home in nearby Holywood at fifteen, moving to Dublin where he entered Trinity College in 1822. He graduated in 1827, and was awarded a gold medal in classics. Haliday then went to Paris, where he stayed for almost a year.

=== Career ===
From 1825 to 1840, Haliday spent most of his time in Dublin. He returned frequently to Clifden however, and spent much of his time in London and sometimes visited Lucca, where he stayed with the Pisani family. Haliday also spent much of his time collecting insects across England, most often with Francis Walker and John Curtis at the Darent river and Southgate. In 1835, he joined William Thompson on a tour of England and Wales which began in London at the British Museum and the Zoological Gardens and included visits to Matlock, the Lake District (Vale of Newlands), Crummock Water, Llangollen, and Snowdon. From 1841 and 1848, Haliday spent most, if not all, of his time away from Ireland, mainly at the Pisani family home in Lucca. In 1842, he was appointed High Sheriff of Antrim and lived in the townland of Ballyhowne in the parish of Carnmoney.

From 1854 to 1860, after having moved back to Dublin, Haliday was employed as an Invertebrate Zoology lecturer at the University of Dublin. During these years, he also edited parts of the Natural History Review, became a founding member of the Dublin University Geological Society, gave lectures at meetings of the Dublin University Zoological Association (Trinity College), and curated the insect collections at the same university. He also made regular visits to London, usually staying with Henry Tibbats Stainton. These visits often coincided with meetings of the Entomological Society of London.

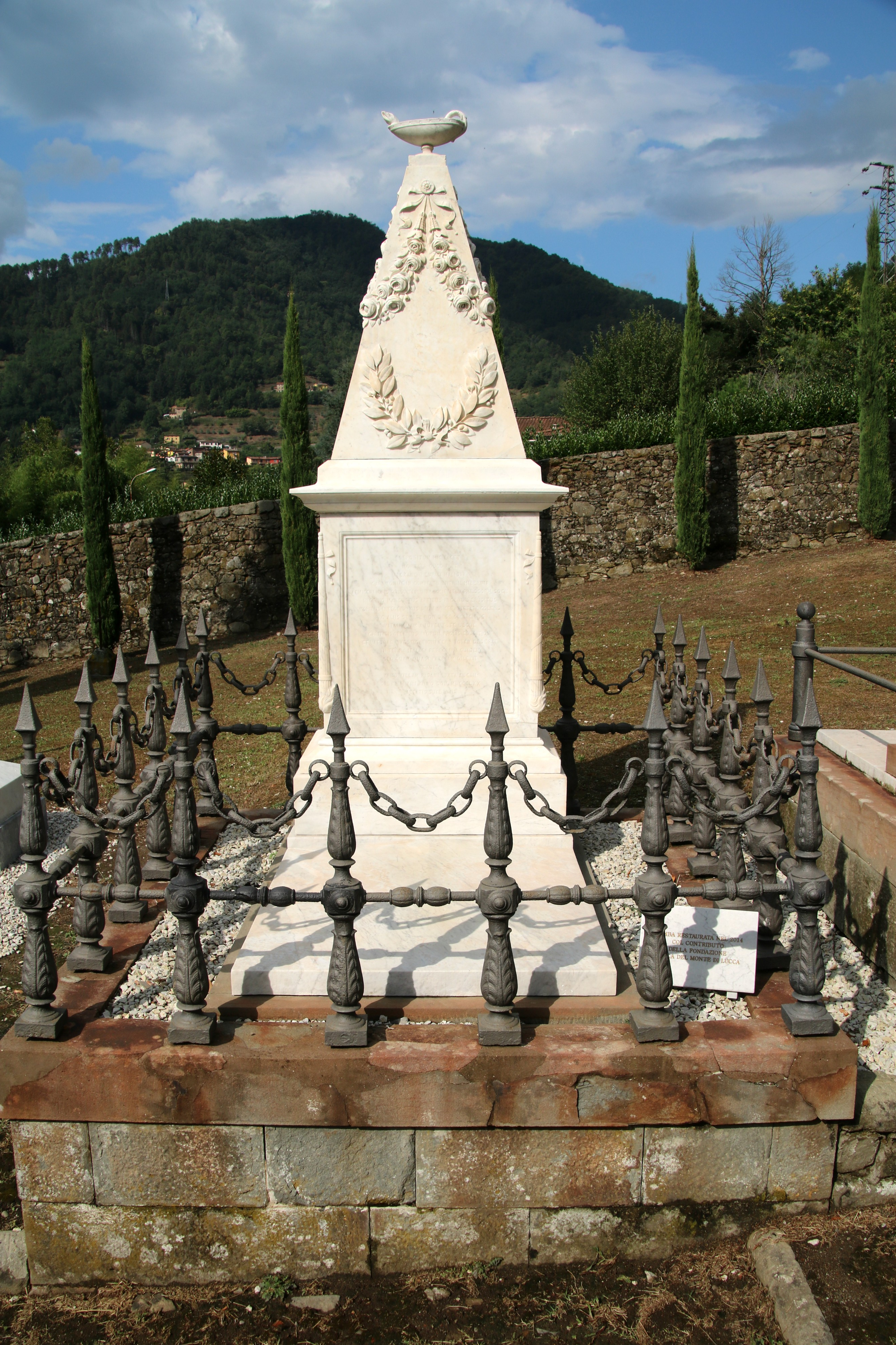
Haliday's grave

=== Later life ===
In February 1862, Haliday moved to Lucca. Following a trip to Sicily, he moved into Villa Pisani with his cousin, Mme. Pisani, and her family. Expeditions and meetings with entomologists became much more frequent. From 1862 until his death, Haliday travelled across Italy collecting insects, mainly in the North (Emilia-Romagna, Liguria, Lombardy, Piedmont, Aosta Valley, and Tuscany), although he made two trips to Sicily. Various trips to Switzerland, France, and Bavaria followed, and in 1865, with Edward Perceval Wright, he made an entomological expedition to Portugal. In 1868 and 1870, he toured Sicily with Wright. Haliday died in Bagni di Lucca in 1870 and is buried there in the English Cemetery.

=== Society memberships ===
Haliday was a member of the Royal Irish Academy, the Microscopical Society of London, the Entomological Society of London, the Linnean Society of London, the Dublin University Zoological Association, the Dublin University Geological Society, the Italian Entomological Society, the Entomological Society of Stettin, and the Galileiana Academy of Arts and Science.

== Technique ==
Haliday worked mainly with very small insects. Study of the tiny parts required dissection, glass slide mounting, and a very high-quality microscope. He acquired his equipment from the London microscopist Andrew Pritchard. Whole specimens were mounted on a card using gum, the card being transfixed by an entomological pin of German manufacture.

Since the descriptions were necessarily based on more than one specimen are sometimes ambiguous (based on more than one species). Collecting and general methodology followed the instructions given by George Samouelle in The entomologist's useful compendium; or, An introduction to the knowledge of British insects, comprising the best means of obtaining and preserving them, and a description of the apparatus generally used and Abel Ingpen's manual Instructions for collecting, rearing, and preserving British & foreign insects: also for collecting and preserving crustacea and shells. On collecting trips he used a Coddington lens.

== Collection ==
Haliday's collection comprising 78 boxes was presented by Trinity of Ireland College to the Museum of Science and Art (now the National Museum of Ireland) in 1882, twelve years after Haliday's death. The dating of the parts of the collection is confusing but the bulk of it was put together before 1860. Although the collection was damaged, and substantial portions of it have been lost, it remains a very large insect collection. The bulk of the material collected by Haliday himself is in the orders Hymenoptera and Diptera. The undamaged Hymenoptera material is laid out in numbered blocks of systematised taxa, usually disparate groups (representing species) disposed below the appropriate generic name. Most of Haliday's specimens are from Ireland, however several of them are from England, Scotland, and Italy. In addition to the specialist collections of Hymenoptera and Diptera, there is Haliday's own general collection (mainly Coleoptera), and a large body of material added to the collection by other entomologists. The largest single source of donations to the collection was Francis Walker, the London entomologist with whom Haliday had a career-long association. The Walker addition was made up mostly of Hymenoptera and Diptera insects, however, it contained insects of most other orders, especially Coleoptera and Thysanoptera. Other collectors represented are John Curtis, James Charles Dale, Jean Antoine Dours, Arnold Förster or Foerster, Hermann Loew, Fernandino Maria Piccioli, G.T.Rudd, William Wilson Saunders, James Francis Stephens, and Thomas Vernon Wollaston. The collection also includes a considerable amount of material taken by Charles Darwin on the Beagle Voyage.

== Major accomplishments ==
- Contributions to the species concept by the designation of type specimens.
- Contributions to the concept of synonymy.
- Establishing rules for systematics and nomenclature.
- Haliday's description of the genus Orphnephila (Diptera: Thaumalaeidae) and the accompanying plate set a new standard of descriptive taxonomy far in advance of anything of its time.
- Haliday's Essay on the classification of parasitic Hymenoptera is a seminal work of higher taxonomy. He was one of the pioneers of the group. The higher classification of the ichneumons is unstable but many of Haliday's higher taxa have survived.
- Haliday was a specialist, working full-time on Diptera in the families Sphaeroceridae and Dolichopodidae and on the Hymenoptera and Thysanoptera (excepting the arena of synonymy)

== Taxa erected by Haliday ==
=== Superfamilies ===
- Proctotrupoidea

=== Families ===
==== Hymenoptera ====
- Mymaridae
- Platygastridae
- Scelionidae
- Trichogrammatidae
- Agaonidae (with Francis Walker)
- Encyrtidae (with Francis Walker)
- Eupelmidae (with Francis Walker)
- Eurytomidae (with Francis Walker)
- Torymidae (with Francis Walker)

==== Other ====
- Japygidae
- Sarcophagidae

=== Subfamilies ===
- Pireninae
- Spalangiinae
- Bethylinae
- Agriotypinae

=== Unranked taxa ===
- Terebrantia

== Notable works ==
- 1832 The characters of two new dipterous genera with indications of some generic subdivisions and several species of Dolichopodidae. Zoological Journal 5: 350–368. 1 pl.
- 1833 with Francis Walker. Monographia Chalciditum. London, 1833–1842, Much of this work was collaborative with Haliday A.H. who was the sole author of the sectional diagnoses.
- 1833-1838 An essay on the classification of the parasitic Hymenoptera of Britain which correspond with the Ichneumones minuti of Linnaeus. Entomological Magazine 1: 259–276; 333–350; 48-491; 2: 93–106; 225–259; 4: 92–106; 203–221; 5:209-248.
- 1836 British species of the dipterous tribe Sphaeroceridae. Entomological Magazine 3: 315–336.
- 1836 An epitome of the British genera in the order Thysanoptera with indications of a few of the species. Entomological Magazine 3: 439–451.
- 1837 with John Curtis, James Charles Dale, Francis Walker, Second edition of A guide to the arrangement of British insects being a catalogue of all the named species hitherto discovered in Great Britain and Ireland
- 1839 Hymenoptera Britannica: Oxyura et Alysia. London, Balliére Fasc. 1: 15, Fasc. 2: 28 et 4.Category:Hymenoptera Britannica : Oxyura et Alysia - Wikimedia Commons
- 1839 Hymenopterorum Synopsis and Methodum Fallenii ut plurimum accommodata (Belfast) 8 4pg. s.titulo.Category:Hymenopterorum Synopsis and Methodum Fallenii ut plurimum accomodata - Wikimedia Commons
- 1851-6 in Francis Walker Insecta Britannica Diptera 3 vols. London Characters and synoptical tables of the order (vol.I: 1-9 of the Empidae (Vol.I:85-88) of the Syrphidae (Vol.I: 234–237) chapters on the Dolichopodidae (Vol.I: 144–221), on the Borborides (Vol.II: 171–184), on the Hydromyzides (Vol.II: 247–269)also the corrigenda and addenda (Vol.III: xi-xvi) and contributions to the J.O. Westwood plates.
- 1851 with Dohrn, C.A. Wissenschaftliche Mittheilungen Sendschreiben von Alexis H. Haliday an C. A. Dohrn über die Dipteren der in London befindlichen Linnéischen Sammlung Aus dem Englischen uberstez von Anna Dohrn and also (index) Haliday, A.H. Über die Dipteren der in London befindlichen Linnéischen Sammlung Stettiner Entomologische Zeitung 12: 131–145.Wissenschaftliche Mittheilungen Sendschreiben von Alexis H. Haliday an C. A. Dohrn über die Dipteren der in London befindlichen Linnéischen Sammlung Aus dem Englischen uberstez von Anna Dohrn - Wikimedia Commons
- 1857 Review Zoonomische Briefe: Allgemeine Darstellung der thierischen Organisation Von Dr. Hermann Burmeister, Professor der Zoologie zu Halle. Ersler und Zweiter Theil 8 vo. Otto Wigand: Leipzig 1856. Natural History Review (Proc.) 4: 69–77.

== Arms ==
Coat of arms of Alexander Henry Haliday

Notes
Confirmed 19 May 1858 by Sir John Bernard Burke, Ulster King of Arms.
Crest
A boar's head couped Argent langued and tusked Or.
Escutcheon
Argent a sword paleways the pommel within a crescent in base Gules. On a canton dexter Azure a St Andrews cross of the first.
Motto
Virtute Parta

== See also ==
- Victorian Age

== Bibliography ==
Based on Hagen Hagen, H.A., 1862-1863 and

- 1824-1840 Contributions to Curtis, J. British Entomology, being illustrations and descriptions of the genera of insects found in Great Britain and Ireland; containing coloured figures from nature of the most rare and beautiful species, and in many instances of the plants upon which they are found London.6 volumes 193 Folios 770 coloured plates (Dissection drawings, text for much of folios relating to Hymenoptera and Diptera).
- 1828 Notice of insects taken in the North of Ireland. Zoological Journal 3: 500–501.
- 1832 The characters of two new dipterous genera with indications of some generic subdivisions and several species of Dolichopidae. Zoological Journal 5: 350–368. 1 pl.
- 1833 Catalogue of Diptera occurring about Holywood in Downshire. Entomological Magazine 1: 147–180.
- 1833 Defence of Mr Westwood's conduct. Entomological Magazine 1: 424.
- 1833 Generic names should be of Greek derivation. Entomological Magazine 1: 515.
- 1833 Burrowing Hymenoptera. Entomological Magazine 1: 516.
- 1833 Public Entomological Collection. Entomological Magazine 1: 518-519
- 1833 An essay on the classification of the parasitic Hymenoptera of Britain which correspond with the Ichneumones minuti of Linnaeus. Entomological Magazine 1: 259–276; 333–350; 48-491.
- 1833-1842 with Walker, F. Monographia Chalcidum. London, 1833–1842. (Much of this work was collaborative with Haliday who was the sole author of the sectional diagnoses. In the M.W.R de V. Graham collection of Francis Walker papers there is an annotated [by Walker] copy of this work Formerly this was the property of Haliday and he had gummed into it proof copies of his figures of Dryinidae and Proctotrupidae Ent. I, plates A-P. Reproduced and dated in O’Connor, J.P, Nash, R and Boucek, Z. (2000).
- 1834 Aleyrodes Phyillyrea. Entomological Magazine 2: 119–120.
- 1834 Notes on the Bethyli and on Dryinus pedestris. Entomological Magazine 2: 219–221.
- 1834 An essay on the classification of the parasitic Hymenoptera of Britain which correspond with the ichneumones minuti of Linnaeus (cont.) Entomological Magazine 2: 93–106; 225–259.
- 1835 Curious economy of Gyrinus villosus. Entomological Magazine 2: 530–531.
- 1835 Psychoda nervosa. Entomological Magazine 2: 531.
- 1836 British species of the dipterous tribe Sphaeroceridae. Entomological Magazine 3: 315–336.
- 1836 An epitome of the British genera in the order Thysanoptera with indications of a few of the species. Entomological Magazine 3: 439–451.
- 1837 Additional Notes on the Order Thysanoptera. Entomological Magazine 4:144-146
- 1837 Notes upon Diptera: characters of some undescribed species of family Muscidae. Entomological Magazine 4:147-152.
- 1837 Notes about Cillenum laterale and a submarine species of Aleocharidae. Entomological Magazine 4: 251–254.
- 1837 Descriptions etc., of the insects collected by Captain P.P. King, R.N., F.R.S. in the survey of the straits of Magellan. Descriptions etc. of the hymenoptera. Transactions of the Linnean Society of London 7: 316–331.
- 1837 An essay on the classification of the parasitic Hymenoptera of Britain which correspond with the Ichneumones minuiti of Linnaeus (cont.). Entomological Magazine 4: 92–106; 203–221.
- 1837 with Curtis, Dale, J., Walker, F..Second edition of A guide to the arrangement of British insects being a catalogue of all the named species hitherto discovered in Great Britain and Ireland.(Six pages of introductory matter are followed by 282 columns of insect names in two columns per page systematically arranged and followed by an index to genera. This work attributed to John Curtis was in fact co-authored by John Dale, Francis Walker and Alexander Henry Haliday; Haliday and Walker writing almost the whole of the sections on Diptera and parasitic Hymenoptera. The list contains 1500 generic and 15,000 specific names. Ireland and Britain are not separated).
- 1838 Note on Dryinus etc. Entomological Magazine 5: 518.
- 1838 Note on the genus Epyris. Entomological Magazine 5: 519.
- 1838 Addenda to the genus Alysia. Entomological Magazine 5: 519.
- 1838 Description of the larva of Blaps mortisaga. Transactions of the Entomological Society of London. 2: 100–102, fig.
- 1838 Description of new British Insects indicated in Mr Curtis's Guide. Annals of Natural History series 1, 2: 112;121; 183–190.
- 1838 An essay on the classification of the parasitic Hymenoptera of Britain which correspond with the Ichneumones minuiti of Linnaeus (cont.) Entomological Magazine 5:209-248.
- 1838 Additional Notes on the Order Thysanoptera. Entomological Magazine 4:144-146.
- 1838 Notes upon Diptera: characters of some undescribed species of family Muscidae. Entomological Magazine 4: 147–152.
- 1838 Notes about Cillenum laterale and a submarine species of Aleocharidae. Entomological Magazine 4: 251–254.
- 1839 Hymenoptera Britannica: Oxyura (Circumscriptional name) et Alysia (Alysiinae Leach, 1815). London, Balliére Fasc. 1: 15, Fasc. 2: 28 et 4.
- 1839 Hymenopterorum Synopsis and Methodum Fallenii ut plurimum accommodata (Belfast) 4pg. s.titulo.
- 1839-1840 contributions to Westwood J. O. An introduction to the modern classification of insects. London Vol.1 (1839): 1-462 Vol.2 (1840): 1-587
- 1839-Revision of Psychoda Pl. 745, pp. 1–2. In Curtis, J., British entomology
- 1841 Note on the primary divisions of Carabidae. Entomologist 1841: 185–186.
- 1841 Notes on Staphylinidae. Entomologist 1841: 186–188.
- 1841 Irish species of Mylaechus. In [Newman, E.] 1841: Varieties by Various Contributors.The Entomologist, London [1][1840-1842] (Nr. VIII): 125-128 - [1] (1840-1842) (Nr. XII) 190
- 1842 Note on Adelotopus. Entomologist 1842: 305–306.
- 1843 in Thompson, W. 1843 Report on the fauna of Ireland: Div. Invertebrata. British Association Report.online
- 1844 Sunday school rhymes and other metrical pieces by a teacher Belfast, Henry Greer; London, Houlston and Stoneman.Published anonymously.
- 1846 Excursion of an Insect Hunter in the Carinthian Highlands. The Annals and Magazine of Natural History, Including Zoology, Botany, and Geology, London 18 (1846-1847) (120) 339-348 by František Antonín Nickerl communicated by Haliday
- 1846 To expel mites etc. from Cabinets of Insects and to exclude them. The Zoologist: A popular Miscellany of Natural History, London - 4 1524
- 1847 On the Branchiostoma Spongillae (larva Sisyrae) and on Conipoteryx. Transactions of the Entomological Society of London 5: (Proc).: 31–32.
- 1847 Reports on zoology for 1843, 1844 Translated from the German by George Busk, Alfred Tulk, esq. and Alexander H. Haliday, esq. London, Printed for the Ray Society
- 1851-6 in Walker, F.Insecta Britannica Diptera 3 vols. London. (Characters and synoptical tables of the order (vol.I: 1-9 of the Empidae (Vol.I:85-88) of the Syrphidae (Vol.I: 234–237) chapters on the Dolichopidae (Vol.I: 144–221), on the Borborides (Vol.II: 171–184), on the Hydromyzides (Vol.II: 247–269) also the corrigenda and addenda (Vol.III:pxi-xvi) and contributions to the J.O. Westwood plates Separates the "Brittanic" Diptera into those from England, Scotland, Wales and Ireland (E.S.W.I.)).
- 1851 with Dorn, C.A., Wissenschaftliche Mittheilungen Sendschreiben von Alexis H. Haliday an C. A. Dohrn über die Dipteren der in London befindlichen Linnéischen Sammlung Aus dem Englischen uberstez von Anna Dohrn but also (index) Haliday, A.H. Über die Dipteren der in London befindlichen Linnéischen Sammlung Stettiner Entomologische Zeitung 12: 131–145.
- 1851 Summary of the natural history of ants. Iris Sunday-school Magazine, ? - 2 (Nr. 13; 14) 6–10; 30-32
- 1852 A.H. Haliday, in F. Walker. List of the specimens of homopterous insects in the collection of the British Museum, part iv: 1094–1118. pls. V-viii. London 1852.
- 1855 Review. Recent works on the Diptera of Northern Europe. Natural History Review (Proc.) 2: 49-61 See Neal L. Evenhuis, 2007 On a little-known work by A.H. Haliday containing nomenclatural notes on Diptera genus-group names Zootaxa 1407: 65–66 (Insecta: Brachycera)
- 1855 Notes on various insects captured or observed in the neighbourhood of Dingle, Co Kerry in July 1854. Natural History Review (Proc.) 2: 50–55.(with Authur Riky Hogan)
- 1855 Descriptions of insects figured and references to lates illustrating the notes on Kerry insects. Natural History Review (Proc.) 2: 59–64. pl. 2 and Zoologist p. 4756.
- 1855 Obituary of William Wing Natural History Review 2: 48
- 1855 On some Irish Insects. Natural History Review (Proc.) 2: 116–124. P.III.
- 1855 Entomological remarks. [Trichopteryx]. The natural history review: a quarterly journal of biological science, Proceedings, London; Edinburgh; Dublin - 2 116–124, 1 plate.
- 1855 Daraus: Gelegentliche Bemerkungen uber entomologische Nomenclatur. Stettiner Entomologische Zeitung 16: 287-290
- 1855-1873 with Stainton, H.T., Zeller, P.C., Douglas, J.W. and Frey.H. The Natural History of the Tineina 13 volumes, (2000 pages English French, German and Latin editions. Text additions, synonymies and translations).
- 1856 On the wing veins of Insects. Natural History Review (Proc.) 2: 59–64. cf. Transactions Entomological Society. London Ser. 2 T4: 64.
- 1856 On the affinities of the Aphaniptera among insects. Natural History Review (Proc.) 3: 9-19 tab. 1.
- 1856 Descriptions of the larvae of Ochthebius punctatus and Diglossa mersa. Natural History Review 3: 20. Fig.
- 1856 Notice on larvae infesting the horns of Oreas canna. Natural History Review (Proc.) 3: 23. fig.
- 1856 Notice on two Irish dipterous insects. Natural History Review (Proc.) 3:32-33.
- 1856 Recent works on the Diptera of Northern Europe. Supplementary Notie.Zetterstedt, Diptera Scandinaviae.TomXII 8 vo. Lundae 1855.Stenhammar, Copromyzinae Scandinaviae 8 vo. Ppp. 184 Holmiae 1855. Natural History Review (Proc.) 3: 32, 33.
- 1856 Insecta in Thompson, William (edited by Patterson, R.) The natural history of Ireland. Volume 4: Mammalia, reptiles and fishes. Also, invertebrata. London: Henry G. Bohn, 1856.pp. 365–366.
- 1856 Review The Natural History of Ireland in four volumes Vol. IV Mammalia, Reptiles and Fishes: also Invertebrata by the late William Thompson, Esq. 8vol. London: Henry G. Bohn, York Street, Covent Garden 1856 Natural History Review (Proc.) 3: 60–62.
- 1856 Sketch of the present state of knowledge of the Rotifera Proceedings of the Dublin University Zoological & Botanical Association. Natural History Review 3:
- 1857 Entomological notes. Natural History Review (Proc.) 4: 31–36.
- 1857 Explanation of terms used by Dr Hagen in his synopsis of the British Dragon-flies. Entomologists' Annual 164–15. Fig.
- 1857 Note on a peculiar form of the ovaries observed in a hymenopterous insect constituting a new genus and species of the family Diapriadae. Natural History Review (Proc.) 4:166-174, 1 pl.
- 1857 On some remaining blanks in the natural history of the native Diptera. (List of the genera and species of British Diptera, the earlier stages of which are more or less perfectly known with references to the principal authorities). (Additional note on the metamorphosis of some species of Diptera hitherto undescribed or known but imperfectly). Natural History Review (Proc.) 4: 177–196, 1pl.
- 1857 (with Wright, E. P.) Notes of a visit to Mitchelstown Caves by E. Percival Wright, A.B., M.R.I.A., Director of the Dublin University Museum: Hon. Sec. Dublin University Zoological and Botanical Association. With supplemental notes of the blind Fauna of Europe by A.H. Haliday, A.M., M.R.I.A., F.L.S., vice-president of the Dublin University Zoological and Botanical Association. Natural History Review (Proc.) 4: 231–234.
- 1857 Review, Wahre parthenogenesis bei Schmetterlingen and bienen ein beitrag zur fortpflanzungsgeschichte der thiere. Von C.Th.E. von Siebold 8 vol. Leipzig 1856. (On a true parthenogenesis in moths and bees, a contribution to the history of reproduction in animals by C.Th. von Siebold); translated by W.S. Dallas, F.L.S., etc., 8 vo. Van Voorst, London 1857. Natural History Review (Proc.) 4: 64–77.
- 1857 Review Zoonomische Briefe: Allgemeine Darstellung der thierischen Organisation Von Dr. Hermann Burmeister, Professor der Zoologie zu Halle. Ersler und Zweiter Theil 8 vo. Otto Wigand: Leipzig 1856. Natural History Review (Proc.) 4: 69–77.
- 1857 with William Henry Harvey, Review. Retrospect of various works published during the last year, new editions and new works in process. Natural History Review (Proc.) 4: 27–42.
- 1857 with other eds. Obituary of Robert Ball. Natural History Review (Proc.) 4: frontispiece.
- 1862 Caractéres de deux nouveaux genres d’Hymènoptéres de la famille des Chalcididae (Philomides and Chirolophus) de la collection du Docteur Sichel. Annales de la Société Entomologique de France (4) 2: 115–118.
- 1863 Note sur la soie produite par les larves du genre Embia. Bulletin de la Société Entomologique de France.1863: 3
- 1864 Iapyx, a new genus of insects belonging to the stirps Thysanura in the order Neuroptera. Transactions of the Linnean Society of London vol xxiv: 441-447
- 1865 On Dicellura a new genus of Insects belonging to the Stirps Thysanura in the order Neuroptera. Journal of the Linnean Society of London 8: 162–163.
- 1868 Relazione sul Baco dell Oliva — Estratta dall’Agricoltore, periodico mensile del Comizio Agrario Lucchese. Lucca.
- 1868 Description of Periphyllus laricae n.sp. Annales de la Société Entomologique de France8: xi-xiii.
- 1869 Translation of Prof. Hermann Loews paper on Blepharoceridae. La Famiglia dei Blefaroceridi (Blepharoceridae). Bolletino della Societa Entomologica Italiana 1: 85–98.
- 1869 Note sull precedente memoria del Prof. Loew. Bolletino della Societa Entomologica Italiana 1: 99.
- 1869 with A. Targioni-Tozzett, P. Stefanelli, and F. Piccioli, Avvertimento. Bull. Soc. Ent. Ital. Note sull precedente memoria del Prof. Loew. Bolletino della Societa Entomologica Italiana 1: 99.
- 1870 Description d’une éspece nouvelle de la famille des Curculionites:- Rhynchites coligatus. Annales de la Society. Linne de Lyons vol. xviii: 125
- 1885 (posthumous) Notes on Irish Coleoptera (edited by S.A. Stewart). Proceedings of Belfast Naturalists' Field Club 1883-4 Appendix viii 1: 208.

Missing Literature Hymenopterorum Synopsis and Methodum Fallenii ut plurimum accommodata (Belfast) 4pg. s.titulo.was privately printed in Belfast and dated only by contemporary reference (1839). Haliday's name appears nowhere. It is very likely that Haliday had printed many such works, wishing to avoid typographical and editorial errors, but these remain untraced, since anonymous and therefore uncatalogued.

== Sources ==
Institutions (manuscripts, letters)

- Entomologische Bibliotek, Eberswald -Finow, DDR (now Germany)
- Royal Entomological Society, London (by far the biggest repository of Haliday papers so far known although these are only letters to Haliday.)
- Royal Irish Academy, Dublin
- Hope Department of Entomology, Oxford University Museum of Natural History
- Natural History Museum, Vienna
- French National Museum of Natural History, Paris
- Natural History Museum, Berlin
- Natural History Museum, London
- Naturalis Biodiversity Center, Leiden
- Turin Museum of Natural History
- Museum of Zoology and Natural History "La Specola", Florence (Italy)

Source Publications

- Nash, R, and O'Connor, J.P. 1982 Notes on the entomological collection of A. H. Haliday (1806–1870) in the National Museum of Ireland with a recommendation for type designations. Proc.R.Ir.Acad. 82(B):169-174, 4 plates
- Nash, R. 1983 A brief summary of the development of entomology in Ireland during the years 1790–1870. Irish Naturalists' Journal 21: 145-150
- Anon.,1902. Irish Naturalist 11:197-199.
- Osten Sacken. C.R., 1903. Record of my life work in entomology. vii + 240pp. (pp. 51–62 portrait). Cambridge, Massachusetts.
- Graham, M.W.R. de V. 1985 (29 Jul 1985), On some Rondani types of Chalcidoidea (Hym.) in the Haliday collection, Dublin. Entomologist's Monthly Magazine 121:159-162
- Howard, L.O., 1930. Smithsonian miscellaneous Collections 84: 217, 231, portrait.
- Neave. A., 1933. A Centennial history of the Entomological Society of London. (p. 134). London.
- National Museum [Of Ireland] Bulletin 3: 27–28, portrait. Dublin.
- Graham, M.W.R. de V. 1985 (29 Jul 1985), On some Rondani types of Chalcidoidea (Hym.) in the Haliday collection, Dublin. Entomologist's Monthly Magazine 121:159-162
- George C. Steyskal, F. Christian Thompson, Wayne N. Mathis and Lloyd Knutson, 2003 The type species of Ilione (Diptera: Sciomyzidae)[Die Typus-Art der Gattung Ilione (Diptera: Sciomyzidae)]Studia dipterologica 10 (2003) Heft 2: 559-564 pdf

Source Obituaries

- 1870 Anon. Entomologist's Monthly Magazine 7:91.
- 1870 Anon. Abeille 7: lxxv-lxxvi.
- 1870 Anon. American Journal of Science 50:294.
- 1870 Anon. Nature, London 2: 240.
- 1870 Kraatz, G. Berliner Entomologisches Zeitschrift 14:x.
- 1871 Anon. Proceedings of the Linnean Society of London 1870-71: lxxxvii-lxxxviii.
