= Mesosphaerocera =

Scientific classification
- Kingdom: Animalia
- Phylum: Arthropoda
- Class: Insecta
- Order: Diptera
- Family: Sphaeroceridae
- Subfamily: Sphaerocerinae
- Genus: Mesosphaerocera; Kim, 1972

Type species
- Sphaerocera annulicornis Malloch, 1913

Genus of flies

Mesosphaerocera is a genus of flies belonging to the family Sphaeroceridae. Along with Parasphaerocera and Neosphaerocera, Mesosphaerocera is closely related to Afromyia and Sphaerocera and forms a distinct supergeneric group.

== Species ==
- Mesosphaerocera amicimyrmex Kim, 1972
- Mesosphaerocera annulicornis (Malloch, 1913)
- Mesosphaerocera facialis (Papp, 1978)
- Mesosphaerocera pueblensis Kim, 1972
- Mesosphaerocera robusta (Kim, 1972)
