= Eriosoma =

Eriosoma may refer to:

- Eriosoma (aphid) Leach, 1818, a genus of aphid in the family Aphididae
- Eriosoma Blanchard 1846, a genus of insects in the family Cerambycidae; synonym of Eriocharis
- Eriosoma Lioy, 1864, a genus of flies in the family Sphaeroceridae; synonym of Crumomyia
