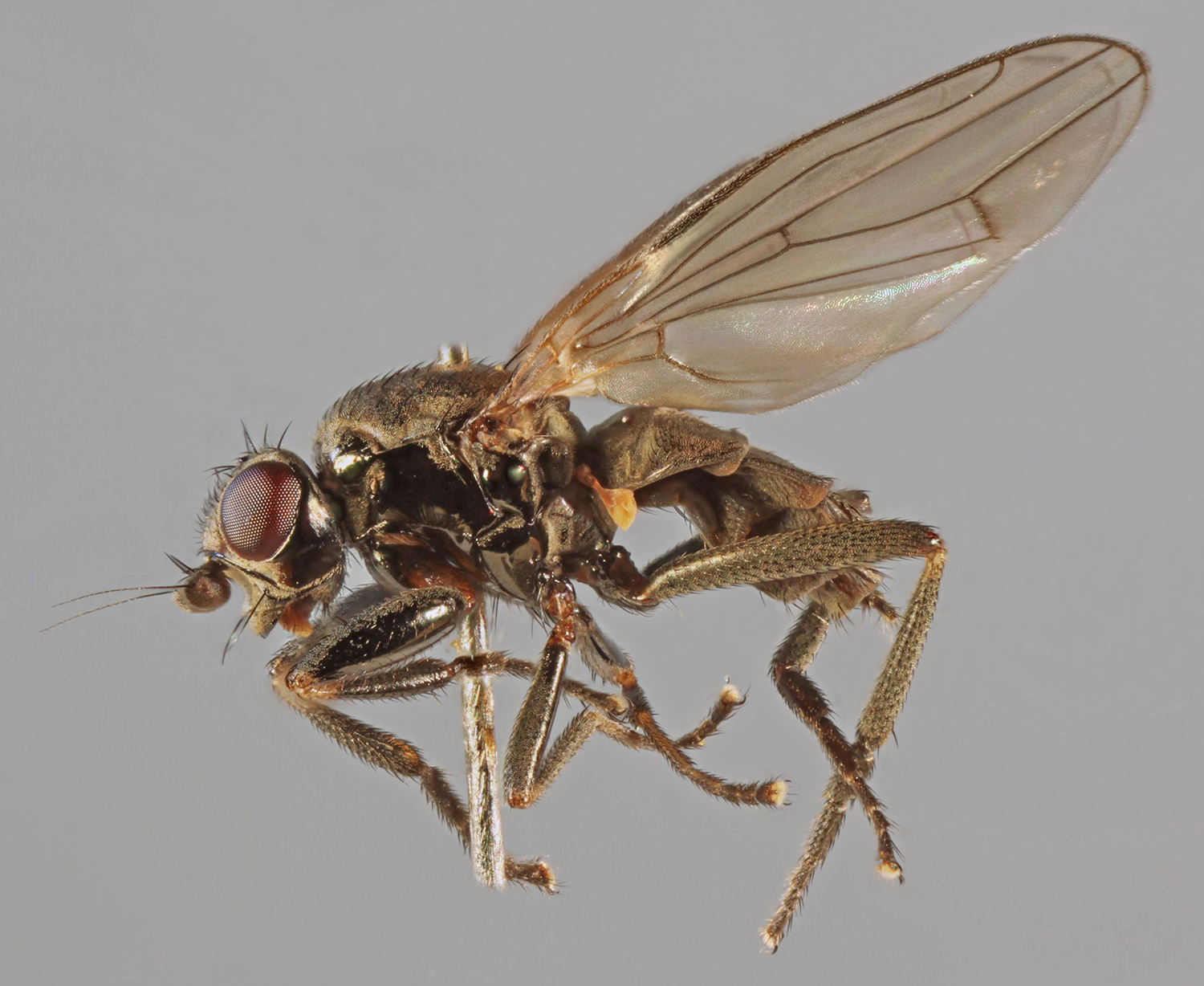
- Lotophila atra

Scientific classification
- Kingdom: Animalia
- Phylum: Arthropoda
- Class: Insecta
- Order: Diptera
- Family: Sphaeroceridae
- Subfamily: Copromyzinae
- Genus: Lotophila; Lioy, 1864

Type species
- Borborus lugens Meigen, 1830

Synonyms
- Olinea Richards, 1965

= Lotophila =

Genus of flies

Lotophila is a genus of flies belonging to the family Sphaeroceridae.

== Species ==
- Lotophila atra (Meigen, 1830)
- Lotophila nepalensis Hayashi, 1991
- Lotophila vietnamica Hayashi, 2003
