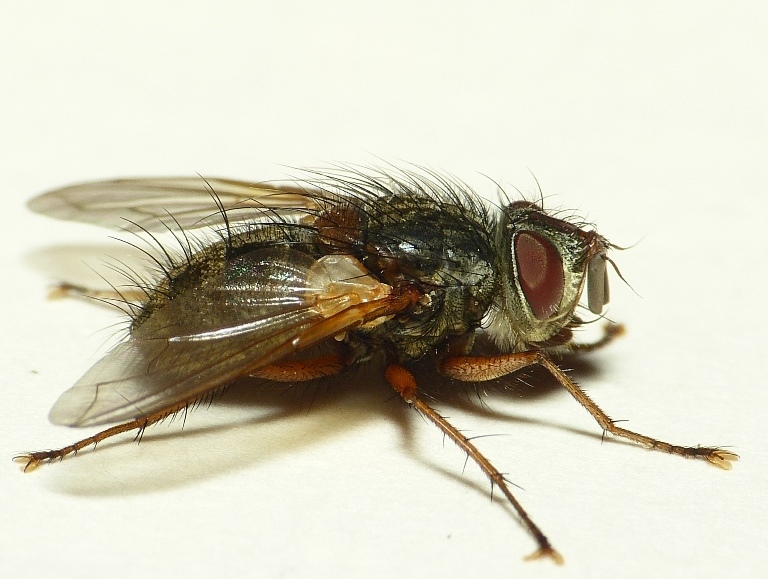
- Phryno vetula

Scientific classification
- Kingdom: Animalia
- Phylum: Arthropoda
- Class: Insecta
- Order: Diptera
- Family: Tachinidae
- Subfamily: Exoristinae
- Tribe: Goniini
- Genus: Phryno; Robineau-Desvoidy, 1830

Type species
- Phryno agilis Robineau-Desvoidy, 1830

Synonyms
- Entomobia Lioy, 1864; Eurigaster Macquart, 1834; Eurygaster Agassiz, 1846; Paraphryno Townsend, 1933; Phrino Rondani, 1861

= Phryno =

Genus of flies

Phryno is a genus of flies in the family Tachinidae.

== Species ==
- Phryno brevicornis Tachi, 2013
- Phryno jilinensis (Sun, 1993)
- Phryno katoi Mesnil, 1963
- Phryno koreana Tachi, 2013
- Phryno nepalensis Tachi, 2013
- Phryno tenuiforceps Tachi, 2013
- Phryno tibialis (Sun, 1993)
- Phryno vetula (Meigen, 1824)
- Phryno yichengica Chao & Liu, 1999
