= Sphaerocerinae =

Scientific classification
- Domain: Eukaryota
- Kingdom: Animalia
- Phylum: Arthropoda
- Class: Insecta
- Order: Diptera
- Family: Sphaeroceridae
- Subfamily: Sphaerocerinae; Macquart, 1835

Type genus
- Sphaerocera Latreille, 1804

Subfamily of flies

Sphaerocerinae is a subfamily of flies belonging to the family Sphaeroceridae.

== Genera ==
- Afromyia Kim, 1968
- Ischiolepta Lioy, 1864
- Lotobia Lioy, 1864
- Mesosphaerocera Kim, 1972
- Neosphaerocera Kim, 1972
- Parasphaerocera Spuler, 1924
- Safaria Richards, 1950
- Sphaerocera Latreille, 1804
- Trichosphaerocera Papp, 1978
