= Phthitia =

Scientific classification
- Kingdom: Animalia
- Phylum: Arthropoda
- Clade: Pancrustacea
- Class: Insecta
- Order: Diptera
- Family: Sphaeroceridae
- Subfamily: Limosininae
- Genus: Phthitia; Enderlein, 1938

Type species
- Phthitia venosa Enderlein, 1938

Synonyms
- Phtitia Hackman, 1969; Pterodrepana Enderlein, 1938; Aubertinia Richards, 1951

Genus of flies

Phthitia is a genus of flies belonging to the family of Sphaeroceridae.

== Species ==
These 42 species belong to the genus Phthitia.

Subgenus Phthitia (Alimosina) Roháček, 1983
Phthitia empirica (Hutton, 1901)
Subgenus Phthitia (Aubertinia)
Phthitia sanctaehelenae (Richards, 1951)
Subgenus Phthitia (Kimosina) Roháček, 1983
(The genus Limosina also has a subgenus named Kimosina.)
Phthitia plumosula (Rondani, 1880)
Phthitia popularis (Richards, 1973)
Phthitia vulgaris Papp, 2017
Not assigned to subgenus

Phthitia alexandri Richards, 1955
Phthitia antillensis Marshall, 1992
Phthitia basilata Su, 2011
Phthitia bicalyx Marshall, 1992
Phthitia cercipilis Marshall, 1992
Phthitia charpentieri Marshall & Smith, 1995
Phthitia cortesi Marshall & Smith, 1995
Phthitia digiseta Marshall, 1992
Phthitia digistylus Marshall, 1992
Phthitia emarginata Marshall, 2009
Phthitia globosa Su, Liu & Xu, 2013
Phthitia gonzalezi Marshall & Smith, 1995
Phthitia incognita Papp, 2017
Phthitia lineasterna Marshall, 1992
Phthitia lobocercus Marshall, 1992
Phthitia longidigita Su, 2011
Phthitia longisetosa (Duda, 1909)
Phthitia longula Su, Liu & Xu, 2013
Phthitia luteocercus Marshall, 1992
Phthitia luteofrons Marshall, 1992
Phthitia megocula Marshall, 1992
Phthitia miradorensis Marshall & Smith, 1995
Phthitia mulroney Marshall, 1992
Phthitia nerida Marshall, 1992
Phthitia nigrifacies Marshall, 1992
Phthitia notthomasi Marshall, 1992
Phthitia obunca Marshall, 1992
Phthitia occimosa Marshall, 1992
Phthitia ovicercus Marshall, 1992
Phthitia plesiocercus Marshall, 2009
Phthitia pollex Su, 2011
Phthitia quadricercus Marshall, 1992
Phthitia selkirki (Enderlein, 1938)
Phthitia spinicalyx Marshall, 1992
Phthitia squamosa Marshall & Winchester, 1999
Phthitia sternipilis Su, Liu & Xu, 2013
Phthitia venosa Enderlein, 1938

This genus formerly included the subgenera Collimosina, Phthitia, and Rufolimosina.
