= Last Glacial Maximum =

Circa 24,000–16,000 BCE; most recent era when ice sheets were at their greatest extent

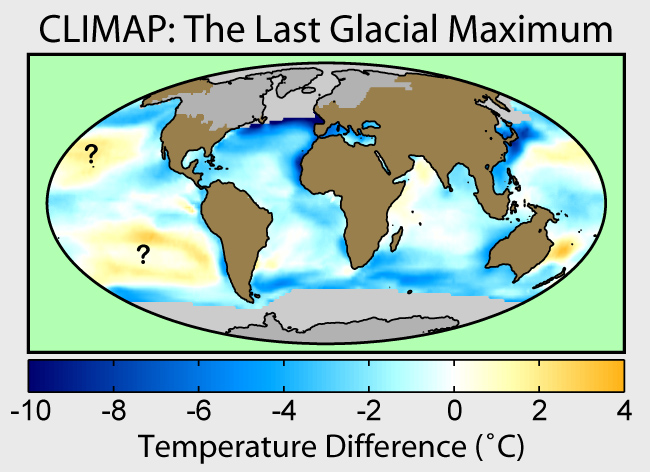
A map of sea surface temperature changes and glacial extent during the last glacial maximum, according to Climate: Long range Investigation, Mapping, and Prediction, a mapping project conducted by the National Science Foundation in the 1970s and 1980s

The Last Glacial Maximum (LGM), also referred to as the Last Glacial Coldest Period, was the most recent time during the Last Glacial Period where ice sheets were at their greatest extent between 26,000 and 20,000 years ago. Ice sheets covered much of Northern North America, Northern Europe, and Asia and profoundly affected Earth's climate by causing a major expansion of deserts, alongside a large drop in sea levels.

Based on changes in position of ice sheet margins dated via terrestrial cosmogenic nuclides and radiocarbon dating, the growth of ice sheets in the southern hemisphere commenced around 33,000 years ago and maximum coverage has been estimated to have occurred sometime between 26,500 years ago and 20,000 years ago. After this, deglaciation caused an abrupt rise in sea level. Decline of the West Antarctica ice sheet occurred between 15,000 and 14,000 years ago, consistent with evidence for another abrupt rise in the sea level around 14,500 years ago. Glacier fluctuations around the Strait of Magellan suggest the peak in glacial surface area was constrained to between 25,200 and 23,100 years ago.

There are no agreed dates for the beginning and end of the LGM, and researchers select dates depending on their criteria and the data set consulted. Jennifer French, an archeologist specialising in the European Palaeolithic, dates its onset at 27,500 years ago, with ice sheets at their maximum by around 26,000 years ago and deglaciation commencing between 20,000 and 19,000 years ago. The LGM is referred to in Britain as the Dimlington Stadial, dated to between 31,000 and 16,000 years ago.

== Glacial climate ==
A map of vegetation patterns during the last glacial maximum

The average global temperature around 21,000 years ago was about 6 °C (11 °F) colder than today. According to the United States Geological Survey (USGS), permanent summer ice covered around 8% of Earth's surface and 25% of the land area during the last glacial maximum. The USGS also states that sea level was about 125 meters (410 ft) lower than today (2012). By comparison, the average global temperature for the period 2013–2017 was 15 °C (59 °F), and as of 2012, around 3.1% of Earth's surface and 10.7% of the land area was covered in year-round ice.

Carbon sequestration in the highly stratified and productive Southern Ocean was essential in producing the LGM. The formation of an ice sheet or ice cap requires both prolonged cold and precipitation (snow). Hence, despite having temperatures similar to those of glaciated areas in North America and Europe, East Asia remained unglaciated except at higher elevations. This difference was because the ice sheets in Europe produced extensive anticyclones above them. These anticyclones generated air masses that were so dry on reaching Siberia and Manchuria that precipitation sufficient for the formation of glaciers could never occur (except in Kamchatka where these westerly winds lifted moisture from the Sea of Japan). The relative warmth of the Pacific Ocean due to the shutting down of the Oyashio Current and the presence of large east–west mountain ranges were secondary factors that prevented the development of continental glaciation in Asia.

All over the world, climates at the Last Glacial Maximum were cooler and almost everywhere drier. In extreme cases, such as Southern Australia and the Sahel, rainfall could have been diminished by up to 90% compared to the present, with flora diminished to almost the same degree as in glaciated areas of Europe and North America. Even in less affected regions, rainforest cover was greatly diminished, especially in West Africa where a few refugia were surrounded by tropical grasslands. The Amazon rainforest was split into two large blocks by extensive savanna, and the tropical rainforests of Southeast Asia probably were similarly affected, with deciduous forests expanding in their place except on the east and west extremities of the Sundaland shelf. Only in Central America and the Chocó region of Colombia did tropical rainforests remain substantially intact – probably due to the extraordinarily heavy rainfall of these regions. Most of the world's deserts expanded. Exceptions were in what is the present-day Western United States, where changes in the jet stream brought heavy rain to areas that are now desert and large pluvial lakes formed, the best known being Lake Bonneville in Utah. Similar conditions occurred in central Iran, where geomorphological evidence from the Masileh Depression indicates that the Hoz-e-Sultan, Mareh, and Salt Lake basins once merged into a single, integrated pluvial lake covering approximately 6,190 square kilometers during the Quaternary.

In Australia, shifting sand dunes covered half the continent, while the Chaco and Pampas in South America became similarly dry. Present-day subtropical regions also lost most of their forest cover, notably in eastern Australia, the Atlantic Forest of Brazil, and southern China, where open woodland became dominant due to much drier conditions. In northern China – unglaciated despite its cold climate – a mixture of grassland and tundra prevailed, and even here, the northern limit of tree growth was at least 20° farther south than today. In the period before the LGM, many areas that became completely barren desert were wetter than they are today, notably in southern Australia, where Aboriginal occupation is believed to coincide with a wet period between 60,000 and 40,000 years ago. In New Zealand and neighbouring regions of the Pacific, temperatures may have been further depressed during part of the LGM by the world's most recent supervolcanic eruption, the Oruanui eruption, around 25,700 years ago.

However, it is estimated that during the LGM, low-to-mid latitude land surfaces at low elevation cooled on average by 5.8 °C relative to their present-day temperatures, based on an analysis of noble gases dissolved in groundwater rather than examinations of species abundances that have been used in the past.

== World impact ==
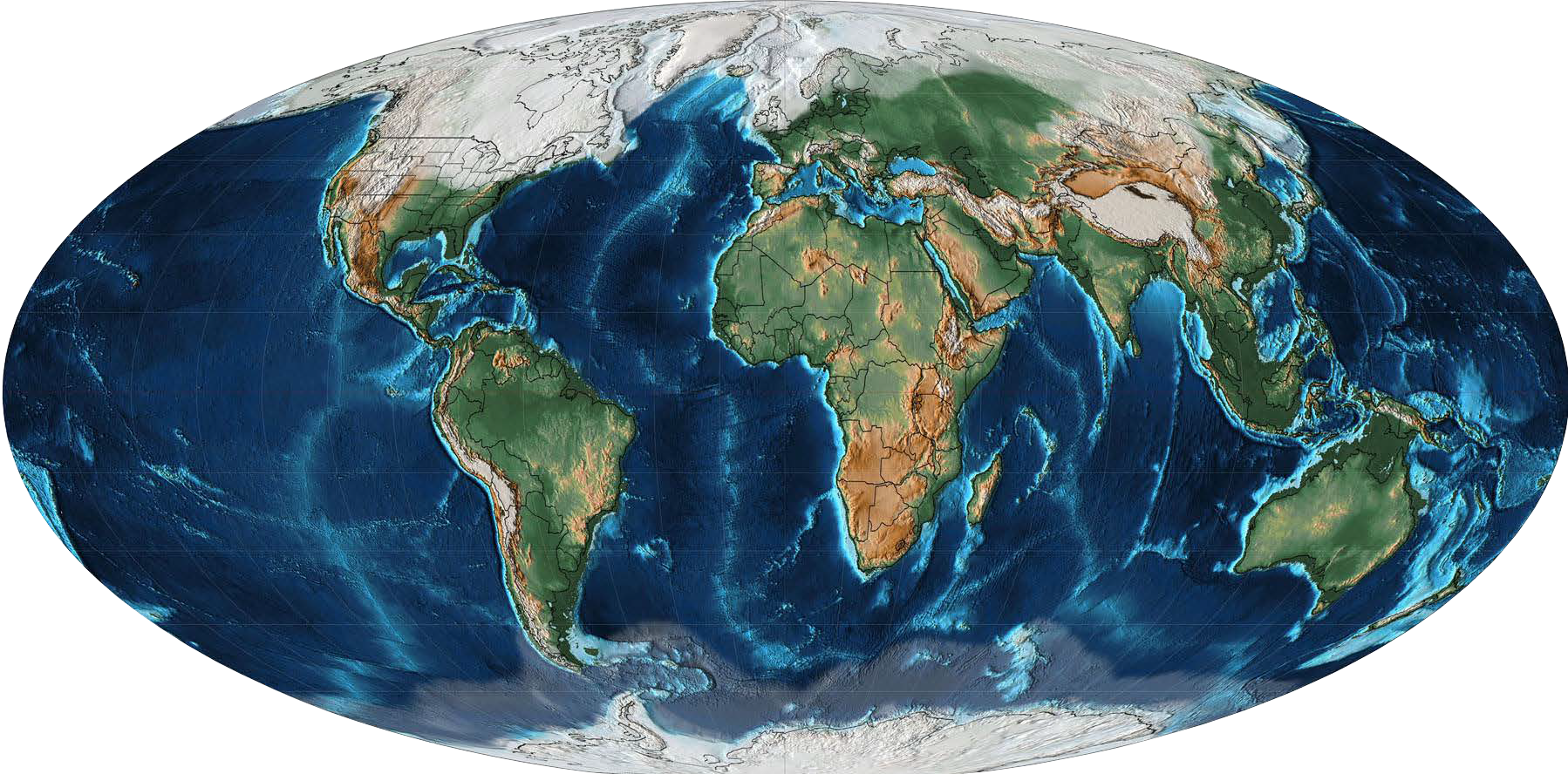
Map of Earth as it was 21,000 years ago during the Last Glacial Maximum

During the Last Glacial Maximum, much of the world was cold, dry, and inhospitable, with frequent storms and a dust-laden atmosphere. The dustiness of the atmosphere is a prominent feature in ice cores; dust levels were as much as 20 to 25 times greater than they are in the present. This was probably due to a number of factors: reduced vegetation, stronger global winds, and less precipitation to clear dust from the atmosphere. The massive sheets of ice locked away water, lowering the sea level, exposing continental shelves, joining land masses together, and creating extensive coastal plains. The ice sheets also changed the atmospheric circulation, causing the northern Pacific and Atlantic oceans to cool and produce more clouds, which amplified the global cooling as the clouds reflected even more sunlight. During the LGM, 21,000 years ago, the sea level was about 125 meters (about 410 feet) lower than it is today. Across most of the globe, the hydrological cycle slowed down, explaining increased aridity in many regions of the world.

=== Africa and the Middle East ===
In Africa and the Middle East, many smaller mountain glaciers formed, and the Sahara Desert and other sandy deserts were greatly expanded in extent. The Atlantic deep sea sediment core V22-196, extracted off the coast of Senegal, shows a major southward expansion of the Sahara.

The Persian Gulf averages about 35 metres in depth and the seabed between Abu Dhabi and Qatar is even shallower, being mostly less than 15 metres deep. For thousands of years the Ur-Shatt (a confluence of the Tigris-Euphrates Rivers) provided fresh water to the Gulf, as it flowed through the Strait of Hormuz into the Gulf of Oman. Bathymetric data suggests there were two palaeo-basins in the Persian Gulf. The central basin may have approached an area of 20,000 km^{2}, comparable at its fullest extent to lakes such as Lake Malawi in Africa. Between 12,000 and 9,000 years ago, much of the Gulf's floor was not covered by water, only being flooded by the sea around 8,000 years ago.

It is estimated that annual average temperatures in Southern Africa were 6 °C lower than at present during the Last Glacial Maximum. This temperature drop alone would however not have been enough to generate widespread glaciation or permafrost in the Drakensberg Mountains or the Lesotho Highlands. Seasonal freezing of the ground in the Lesotho Highlands might have reached depths of 2 meters or more below the surface. A few small glaciers did however develop during the LGM, in particular in south-facing slopes. In the Hex River Mountains, in the Western Cape, block streams and terraces found near the summit of Matroosberg evidences past periglacial activity which likely occurred during the LGM. Palaeoclimatological proxies indicate the region around Boomplaas Cave was wetter, with increased winter precipitation. The region of the Zambezi River catchment was colder relative to present and the local drop in mean temperature was seasonally uniform.

On the island of Mauritius in the Mascarenhas Archipelago, open wet forest vegetation dominated, contrasting with the dominantly closed-stratified-tall-forest state of Holocene Mauritian forests.

=== Asia ===
In northwestern Russia, the Fennoscandian ice sheet reached its LGM extent around 17,000 years ago, about five thousand years later than in Denmark, Germany and Western Poland. Outside the Baltic Shield, and in Russia in particular, the LGM ice margin of the Fennoscandian Ice Sheet was highly lobate. The main LGM lobes of Russia followed the Dvina, Vologda and Rybinsk basins respectively. Lobes originated as result of ice following shallow topographic depressions filled with a soft sediment substrate. The northern Ural region was covered in periglacial steppes.

Whereas southern Siberia was covered predominantly by the mammoth steppe biome, northern Siberia contained much more mesic and wet habitats, including mires, woodlands, and tundras.

There were ice sheets in modern Tibet (although scientists continue to debate the extent to which the Tibetan Plateau was covered with ice) as well as in Baltistan and Ladakh. In Southeast Asia, many smaller mountain glaciers formed, and permafrost covered Asia as far south as Beijing. Because of lowered sea levels, many of today's islands were joined to the continents: the Indonesian islands as far east as Borneo and Bali were connected to the Asian continent in a landmass called Sundaland. Palawan was also part of Sundaland, while the rest of the Philippine Islands formed one large island separated from the continent only by the Sibutu Passage and the Mindoro Strait.

The environment along the coast of South China was not very different from that of the present day, featuring moist subtropical evergreen forests, despite sea levels in the South China Sea being about 100 metres lower than the present day.

=== Australasia ===
A map showing the probable extent of land and water at the time of the last glacial maximum 20,000 years ago and when the sea level was likely more than 110 metres lower than it is today

The Australian mainland, New Guinea, Tasmania and many smaller islands comprised a single land mass. This continent is now sometimes referred to as Sahul. In the Bonaparte Gulf of northwestern Australia, sea levels were about 125 metres lower than present. Interior Australia saw widespread aridity, evidenced by extensive dune activity and falling lake levels. Eastern Australia experienced two nadirs in temperature. Lacustrine sediments from North Stradbroke Island in coastal Queensland indicated humid conditions. Data from Little Llangothlin Lagoon likewise indicate the persistence of rainforests in eastern Australia at this time. Rivers maintained their sinuous form in southeastern Australia and there was increased aeolian deposition of sediment in compared to today. The Flinders Ranges likewise experienced humid conditions, as did Kangaroo Island. In southwestern Western Australia, forests disappeared during the LGM.

Between Sahul and Sundaland – a peninsula of South East Asia that comprised present-day Malaysia and western and northern Indonesia – there remained an archipelago of islands known as Wallacea. The water gaps between these islands, Sahul and Sundaland were considerably narrower and fewer in number than in the present day.

The two main islands of New Zealand, along with associated smaller islands, were joined as one landmass. Virtually all of the Southern Alps were under permanent ice cover, with alpine glaciers extending from them into much of the surrounding high country.

=== Europe ===
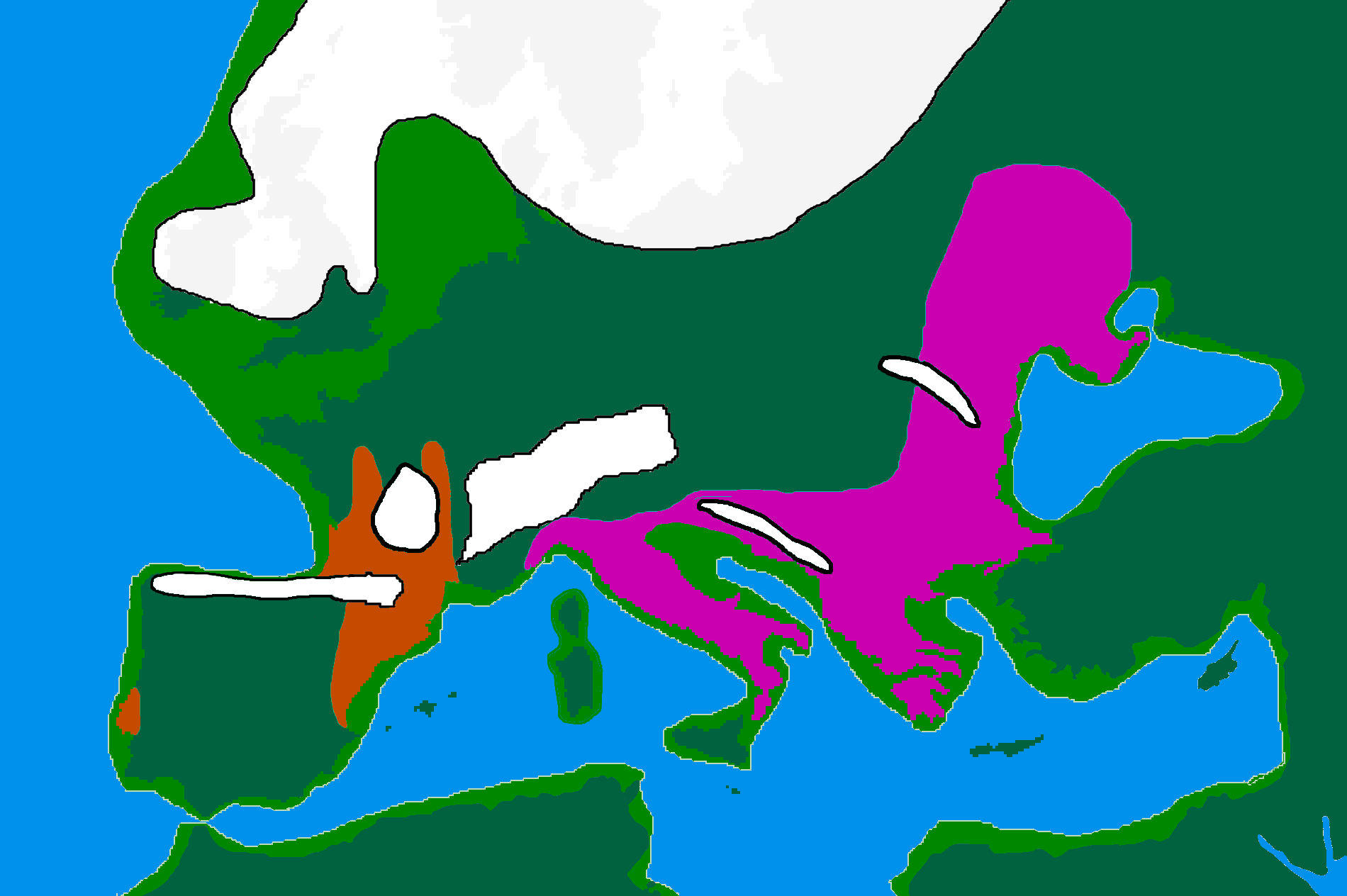
The Last Glacial Maximum refugia, around 20,000 years ago Solutrean culture Epigravettian culture

Reconstructions of the LGM climate in the Western Palearctic, based on rodent associations, suggest that cooling was significantly greater in winter than in summer, consistent with findings from other proxies like pollen. The rodent-based model estimated an average mean annual temperature anomaly of −5.3 °C compared with present-day temperatures, with the mean temperature of the coldest month exhibiting a change of almost −7 °C, while the mean temperature of the warmest month anomaly reached only −3.4 °C. Spatial analysis of these reconstructions indicates a pronounced latitudinal gradient, alongside regional differences, suggesting that temperature anomalies were higher in northwestern Europe but smaller in southwestern and eastern Europe compared to results from some general circulation models.

Northern Europe was largely covered by ice, with the southern boundary of the ice sheets passing through Germany and Poland. This ice extended northward to cover Svalbard and Franz Josef Land and northeastward to occupy the Barents Sea, the Kara Sea, and Novaya Zemlya, ending at the Taymyr Peninsula in what is now northwestern Siberia. Warming commenced in northern latitudes around 20,000 years ago, but it was limited and considerable warming did not take place until around 14,600 years ago.

Permafrost covered Europe south of the ice sheet down to as far south as present-day Szeged in Southern Hungary. Ice covered the whole of Iceland. In addition, ice covered Ireland along with roughly the northern half of the British Isles with the southern boundary of the ice sheet running approximately from the south of Wales to the north east of England, and then across the now submerged land of Doggerland to Denmark. Central Europe had isolated pockets of relative warmth corresponding to hydrothermally active areas, which served as refugia for taxa not adapted to extremely cold climates.

In the Cantabrian Mountains of the northwestern corner of the Iberia, which in the present day have no permanent glaciers, the LGM led to a local glacial recession as a result of increased aridity caused by the growth of other ice sheets farther to the east and north, which drastically limited annual snowfall over the mountains of northwestern Spain. The Cantabrian alpine glaciers had previously expanded between around 60,000 and 40,000 years ago during a local glacial maximum in the region. In northeastern Iberia, the LGM was not the coldest part of MIS 2; the interval immediately after from 18,000 to 14,000 years ago was.

In northeastern Italy, in the region around Lake Fimon, Artemisia-dominated semideserts, steppes, and meadow-steppes replaced open boreal forests at the start of the LGM, specifically during Heinrich Stadial 3. The overall climate of the region became both drier and colder.

In the Sar Mountains, the glacial equilibrium-line altitude was about 450 meters lower than in the Holocene. In Greece, steppe vegetation predominated.

Megafaunal abundance in Europe peaked around 27,000 and 21,000 years ago; this bountifulness was attributable to the cold stadial climate.

During the LGM, Europe experienced a significant reduction in human population, with estimates suggesting a decline of up to 60%.

=== North America ===
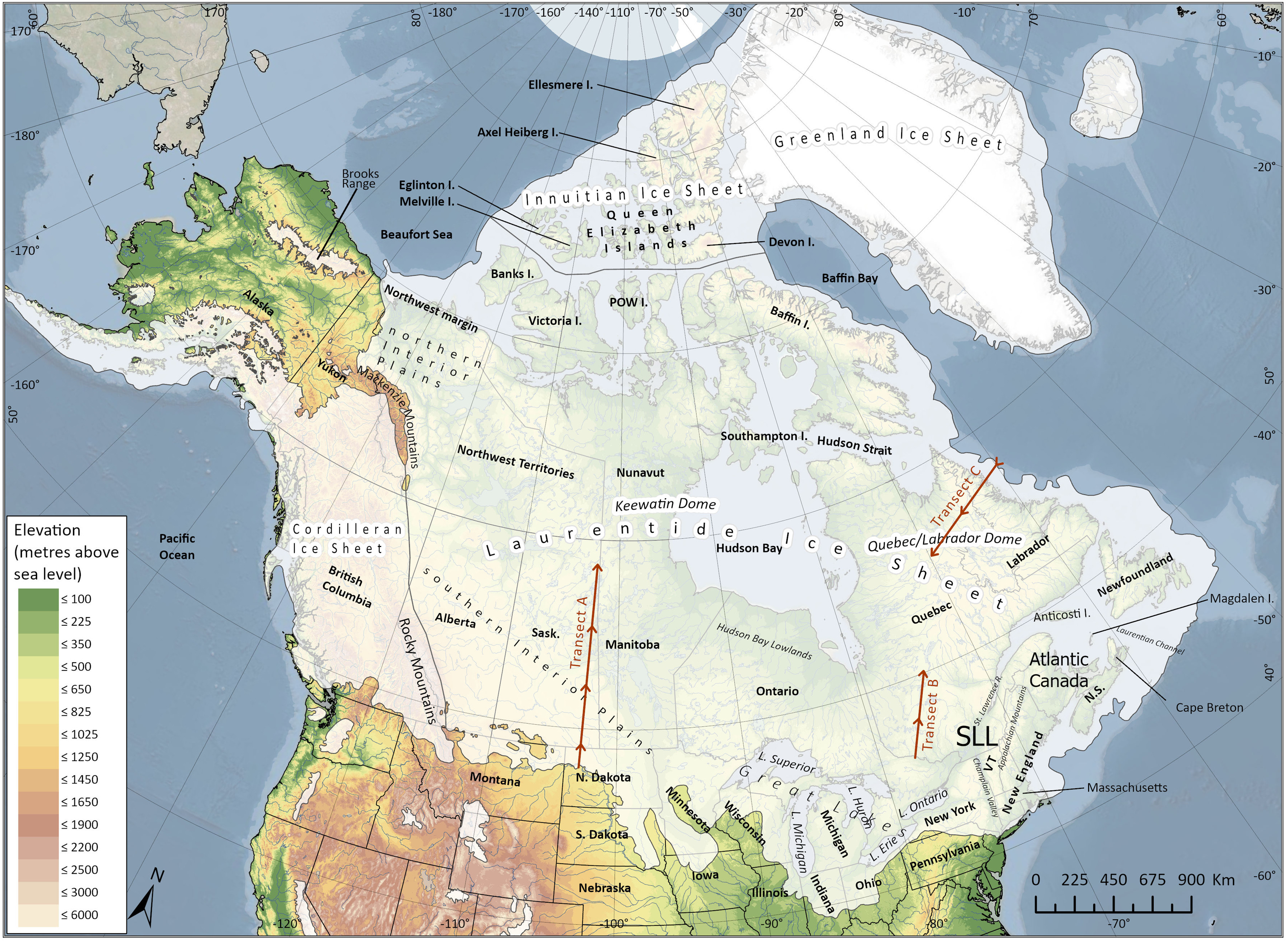
The maximum extent of North American ice sheets during the Last Glacial Maximum c. 20,000 years ago

In Greenland, the difference between LGM temperatures and present temperatures was twice as great during winter as during summer. Greenhouse gas and insolation forcings dominated temperature changes in northern Greenland, whereas Atlantic meridional overturning circulation (AMOC) variability was the dominant influence on southern Greenland's climate. Illorsuit Island was exclusively covered by cold-based glaciers.

Eastern Beringia was extremely cold and dry. July air temperatures in northern Alaska and Yukon were about 2–3 °C lower compared to today. Equilibrium line altitudes in Alaska suggest summer temperatures were 2–5 °C compared to preindustrial. Sediment core analysis from Lone Spruce Pond in southwestern Alaska show it was a pocket of relative warmth.

Following a preceding period of relative retreat from 52,000 to 40,000 years ago, the Laurentide Ice Sheet grew rapidly at the onset of the LGM until it covered essentially all of Canada east of the Rocky Mountains and extended roughly to the Missouri and Ohio Rivers, and eastward to Manhattan, reaching a total maximum volume of around 26.5 to 37 million cubic kilometres. At its peak, the Laurentide Ice Sheet reached 3.2 km in height around Keewatin Dome and about 1.7-2.1 km along the Plains divide. In addition to the large Cordilleran Ice Sheet in Canada and Montana, alpine glaciers advanced and (in some locations) ice caps covered much of the Rocky and Sierra Nevada Mountains further south. Latitudinal gradients were so sharp that permafrost did not reach far south of the ice sheets except at high elevations. Glaciers forced the early human populations who had originally migrated from northeast Siberia into refugia, reshaping their genetic variation by mutation and drift. This phenomenon established the older haplogroups found among Native Americans, and later migrations are responsible for northern North American haplogroups.

Eastern North America became drier. In southeastern North America, between the southern Appalachian Mountains and the Atlantic Ocean, there was an enclave of unusually warm climate.

=== South America ===
In the Southern Hemisphere, the Patagonian Ice Sheet covered the whole southern third of Chile and adjacent areas of Argentina. On the western side of the Andes the ice sheet reached sea level as far north as in the 41 degrees south at Chacao Channel. The western coast of Patagonia was largely glaciated, but some authors have pointed out the possible existence of ice-free refugia for some plant species. On the eastern side of the Andes, glacier lobes occupied the depressions of Seno Skyring, Seno Otway, Inútil Bay, and Beagle Channel. On the Straits of Magellan, ice reached as far as Segunda Angostura.

During the LGM, valley glaciers in the southern Andes (38–43° S) merged and descended from the Andes occupying lacustrine and marine basins where they spread out forming large piedmont glacier lobes. Glaciers extended about 7 km west of the modern Llanquihue Lake, but not more than 2 to 3 km south of it. Nahuel Huapi Lake in Argentina was also glaciated by the same time. Over most of the Chiloé Archipelago, glacier advance peaked 26,000 years ago, forming a long north–south moraine system along the eastern coast of Chiloé Island (41.5–43° S). By that time the glaciation at the latitude of Chiloé was of ice sheet type contrasting to the valley glaciation found further north in Chile.

Despite glacier advances much of the area west of Llanquihue Lake was still ice-free during the Last Glacial Maximum. During the coldest period of the Last Glacial Maximum vegetation at this location was dominated by Alpine herbs in wide open surfaces. The global warming that followed caused a slow change in vegetation towards a sparsely distributed vegetation dominated by Nothofagus species. Within this parkland vegetation Magellanic moorland alternated with Nothofagus forest, and as warming progressed even warm-climate trees began to grow in the area. It is estimated that the tree line was depressed about 1 km relative to present day elevations during the coldest period, but it rose gradually until around 19,300 years ago. At that time a cold reversal caused a replacement of much of the arboreal vegetation with Magellanic moorland and Alpine species. On Isla Grande de Chiloé, Magellanic moorland and closed-canopy Nothofagus forests were both present during the LGM, but the former disappeared by the late LGM.

Little is known about the extent of glaciers during Last Glacial Maximum north of the Chilean Lake District. To the north, in the dry Andes of Central and the Last Glacial Maximum is associated with increased humidity and the verified advance of at least some mountain glaciers. Montane glaciers in the northern Andes reached their peak extent around 27,000 years ago. In northwestern Argentina, pollen deposits record the altitudinal descent of the treeline during the LGM.

Amazonia was much drier than in the present. δD values from plant waxes from the LGM are significantly more enriched than those in the present and those dating back to MIS 3, evidencing this increased aridity. Eastern Brazil was also affected; the site of Guanambi in Bahia was much drier than today.

=== Atlantic Ocean ===
AMOC was weaker and more shallow during the LGM. Sea surface temperatures in the western subtropical gyre of the North Atlantic were around 5 °C colder compared to today. Intermediate depth waters of the North Atlantic were better ventilated during the LGM by Glacial North Atlantic Intermediate Water (GNAIW) relative to its present-day ventilation by upper North Atlantic Deep Water (NADW). GNAIW was nutrient poor compared to present day upper NADW. Below GNAIW, southern source bottom water that was very rich in nutrients filled the deep North Atlantic.

Due to the presence of immense ice sheets in Europe and North America, continental weathering flux into the North Atlantic was reduced, as measured by the increased proportion of radiogenic isotopes in neodymium isotope ratios.

There is controversy whether upwelling off the Moroccan coast was stronger during the LGM compared to today. Though coccolith size increases in Calcidiscus leptoporus suggest stronger trade winds during the LGM caused there to be increased coastal upwelling of the northwestern coast of Africa, planktonic foraminiferal δ^{13}C records show upwelling and primary productivity were not enhanced during the LGM except in transient intervals around 23,200 and 22,300 years ago.

In the western South Atlantic, where Antarctic Intermediate Water forms, sinking particle flux was heightened as a result of increased dust flux during the LGM and sustained export productivity. The increased sinking particle flux removed neodymium from shallow waters, producing an isotopic ratio change.

Evidence from sediment cores in the Scotia Sea suggests the Antarctic Circumpolar Current was weaker during the LGM than during the Holocene. The Antarctic Polar Front (APF) was located much farther to the north compared to its present-day location. Studies suggest it could have been placed as far north as 43°S, reaching into the southern Indian Ocean.

=== Pacific Ocean ===
On Hawaii Island, geologists have long recognized deposits formed by glaciers on Mauna Kea during recent ice ages. The latest work indicates that deposits of three glacial episodes since 200,000 to 150,000 years ago are preserved on the volcano. Glacial moraines on the volcano formed around 70,000 years ago and from around 40,000 to 13,000 years ago. If glacial deposits were formed on Mauna Loa, they have long since been buried by younger lava flows.

Low sea surface temperature (SST) and sea surface salinity (SSS) in the East China Sea during the LGM suggests the Kuroshio Current was reduced in strength relative to the present. Abyssal Pacific overturning was weaker during the LGM than in the present day, although it was temporarily stronger during some intervals of ice sheet retreat. The El Niño–Southern Oscillation (ENSO) was strong during the LGM. Evidence suggests that the Peruvian Oxygen Minimum Zone in the eastern Pacific was weaker than it is in the present day, likely as a result of increased oxygen concentrations in seawater permitted by cooler ocean water temperatures, though it was similar in spatial extent.

The outflow of North Pacific Intermediate Water through the Tasman Sea was stronger during the LGM.

In the Great Barrier Reef along the coast of Queensland, reef development shifted seaward due to the precipitous drop in sea levels, reaching a maximum distance from the present coastline as sea levels approached their lowest levels around 20,700–20,500 years ago. Microbial carbonate deposition in the Great Barrier Reef was enhanced due to low atmospheric CO_{2} levels.

=== Indian Ocean ===
The deep waters of the Indian Ocean were significantly less oxygenated during the LGM compared to the Middle Holocene. The deep southern Indian Ocean in particular was an enormous carbon sink, partially explaining the very low pCO_{2} of the LGM. The intermediate waters of the southeastern Arabian Sea were poorly ventilated relative to today because of the weakened thermohaline circulation.

== Late Glacial Period ==
The Late Glacial Period followed the LGM and preceded the Holocene, which started around 11,700 years ago.

== See also ==
- Climate: Long range Investigation, Mapping, and Prediction – Research project
- Penultimate Glacial Period – Glacial age that occurred before the Last Glacial Period
- Mousterian Pluvial – Obsolete term for a prehistoric wet and rainy period in North Africa
- Holocene glacial retreat – Period of global deglaciation
- Oldest Dryas – Abrupt climatic cooling event during the last glacial retreat
- Older Dryas – Geological period of the Earth
- Bølling–Allerød warming – Interglacial period about 14,000 years ago
  - Bølling oscillation
  - Allerød oscillation
- Younger Dryas – Time period c. 12,900–11,700 years ago
- African humid period – Holocene climate period during which northern Africa was wetter than today
- 8.2-kiloyear event – Rapid global cooling about 8,200 years ago
- 5.9 kiloyear event – North Atlantic ice rafting events
- 4.2-kiloyear event – Severe climatic event starting around 2200 BC
- Older Peron – Global sea-level high-stand during the Holocene Epoch
- Piora Oscillation – Abrupt cold and wet period in the Holocene Epoch
- Little Ice Age – Climatic cooling after the Medieval Warm Period (16th–19th centuries)
- Sea level rise – Rise in sea levels due to climate change
- Black Sea deluge hypothesis – Hypothetical flood scenario
- Timeline of glaciation – Chronology of the major ice ages of the Earth
