= Alloborborus =

Scientific classification
- Kingdom: Animalia
- Phylum: Arthropoda
- Class: Insecta
- Order: Diptera
- Family: Sphaeroceridae
- Subfamily: Copromyzinae
- Genus: Alloborborus; Duda, 1923

Type species
- Copromyza pallifrons Fallén, 1820

Synonyms
- Trichopoda Lioy, 1864

Genus of flies

Alloborborus is a genus of flies belonging to the family Sphaeroceridae.

== Species ==
- A. pallifrons (Fallén, 1820)
