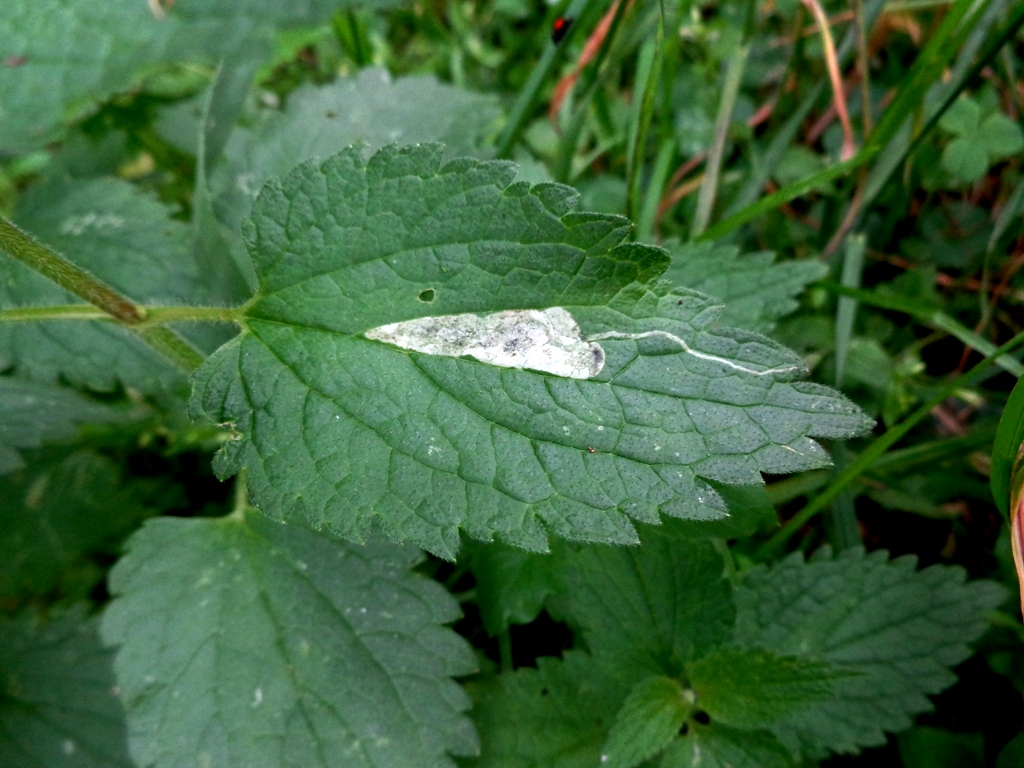
- Amauromyza labiatarum

Scientific classification
- Kingdom: Animalia
- Phylum: Arthropoda
- Class: Insecta
- Order: Diptera
- Family: Agromyzidae
- Subfamily: Phytomyzinae
- Genus: Amauromyza; Hendel, 1931

Type species
- Agromyza lamii Kaltenbach, 1858

Synonyms
- Campanulomyza Nowakowski, 1962; Irenomyia Nowakowski, 1960; Melanophytobia Hering, 1960; Redia Lioy, 1864

= Amauromyza =

Genus of flies

Amauromyza is a genus of flies in the family Agromyzidae.

== Species ==
- Amauromyza abnormalis (Malloch, 1913)
- Amauromyza acuta Sasakawa & Fan, 1985
- Amauromyza albidohalterata (Malloch, 1916)
- Amauromyza aliena (Malloch, 1914)
- Amauromyza angulicornis Zlobin, 1997
- Amauromyza anomala Spencer, 1981
- Amauromyza auriceps (Melander, 1913)
- Amauromyza balcanica (Hendel, 1931)
- Amauromyza belamcandae Sasakawa, 1981
- Amauromyza bifida Sasakawa & Fan, 1985
- Amauromyza boliviensis Sasakawa, 1992
- Amauromyza caliginosa (Spencer, 1963)
- Amauromyza carlinae (Hering, 1944)
- Amauromyza chamaebalani (Hering, 1960)
- Amauromyza chenopodivora Spencer, 1971
- Amauromyza clinopodii Sasakawa, 1998
- Amauromyza confondata Spencer, 1986
- Amauromyza crucifera Sasakawa, 2007
- Amauromyza elaeagni (Rohdendorf-Holmanova, 1959)
- Amauromyza elsinorensis Spencer, 1981
- Amauromyza flavida Spencer, 1975
- Amauromyza flavifrons (Meigen, 1830)
- Amauromyza fuscibasis (Malloch, 1934)
- Amauromyza gigantissima (Spencer, 1959)
- Amauromyza gyrans (Fallén, 1823)
- Amauromyza indecisa (Malloch, 1913)
- Amauromyza insularis Spencer, 1981
- Amauromyza karli (Hendel, 1927)
- Amauromyza knowltoni Spencer, 1986
- Amauromyza labiatarum (Hendel, 1920)
- Amauromyza lamii (Kaltenbach, 1858)
- Amauromyza leonuri Spencer, 1971
- Amauromyza lucens Spencer, 1981
- Amauromyza luteiceps (Hendel, 1920)
- Amauromyza madrilena (Spencer, 1957)
- Amauromyza maltensis Cerný, 2004
- Amauromyza meridionalis (Spencer, 1975)
- Amauromyza mihalyii Spencer, 1971
- Amauromyza monfalconensis (Strobl, 1909)
- Amauromyza morionella (Zetterstedt, 1848)
- Amauromyza nevadensis Spencer, 1981
- Amauromyza nigripennis (Sasakawa, 1961)
- Amauromyza nipponensis (Sasakawa, 1955)
- Amauromyza obscura (Rohdendorf-Holmanova, 1959)
- Amauromyza papuensis Spencer, 1966
- Amauromyza paragyrans Papp, 2019
- Amauromyza plectranthi (Sasakawa, 1961)
- Amauromyza pleuralis (Malloch, 1914)
- Amauromyza pterocaula Valladares, 1998
- Amauromyza queenslandica Spencer, 1977
- Amauromyza rameli Cerný, 2011
- Amauromyza ramosa Sasakawa, 2013
- Amauromyza ranchograndensis Spencer, 1973
- Amauromyza remus Spencer, 1981
- Amauromyza riparia Sehgal, 1971
- Amauromyza romulus Spencer, 1981
- Amauromyza schusteri Spencer, 1981
- Amauromyza scleritica Spencer, 1981
- Amauromyza shepherdiae Sehgal, 1971
- Amauromyza soosi Zlobin, 1985
- Amauromyza stachysi Guglya, 2021
- Amauromyza stroblii (Hendel, 1920)
- Amauromyza triseta (Spencer, 1959)
- Amauromyza verbasci (Bouché, 1847)
