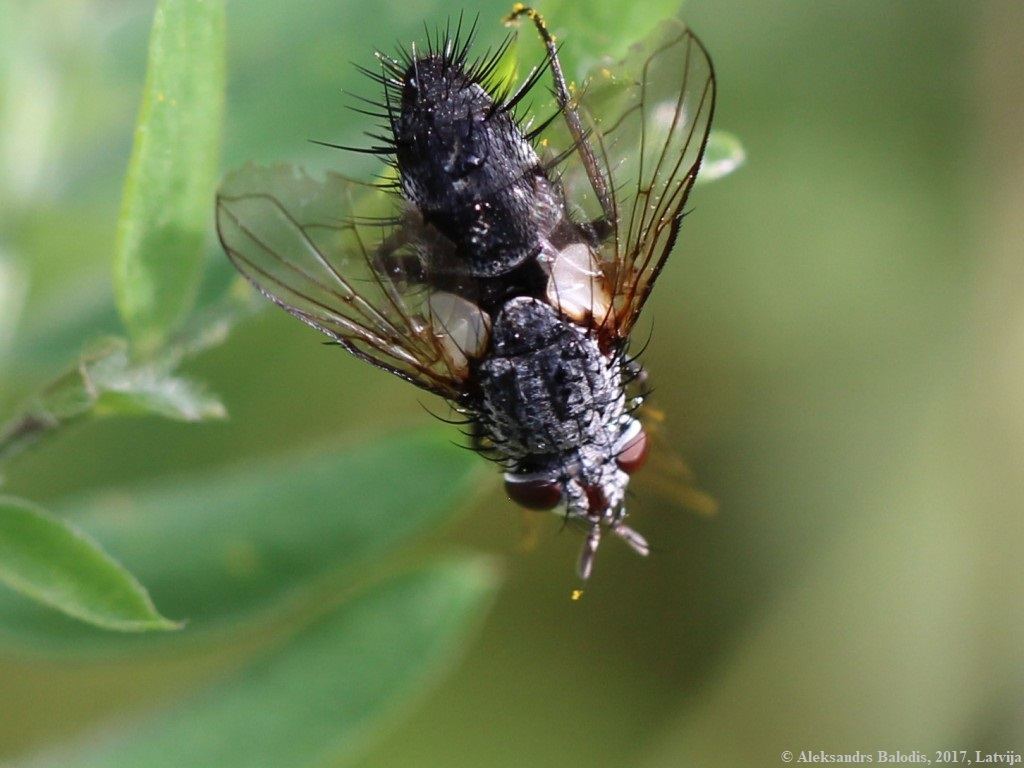
- Demoticus plebejus

Scientific classification
- Kingdom: Animalia
- Phylum: Arthropoda
- Class: Insecta
- Order: Diptera
- Family: Tachinidae
- Subfamily: Tachininae
- Tribe: Leskiini
- Genus: Demoticus; Macquart, 1854

Type species
- Tachina plebeja Fallén, 1810

Synonyms
- Demeticus Lioy, 1864

= Demoticus =

Genus of flies

Demoticus is a genus of flies in the family Tachinidae.

== Species ==
- Demoticus amorphus Villeneuve, 1911
- Demoticus plebejus (Fallén, 1810)
- Demoticus signatipalpis Richter, 2002
