= Trichosphaerocera =

Scientific classification
- Kingdom: Animalia
- Phylum: Arthropoda
- Class: Insecta
- Order: Diptera
- Family: Sphaeroceridae
- Subfamily: Sphaerocerinae
- Genus: Trichosphaerocera; Papp, 1978

Type species
- Trichosphaerocera africana Papp, 1978

Genus of flies

Trichosphaerocera is a genus of flies belonging to the family Sphaeroceridae.

== Species ==
- Trichosphaerocera africana Papp, 1978
