= Rufolimosina =

Scientific classification
- Kingdom: Animalia
- Phylum: Arthropoda
- Class: Insecta
- Order: Diptera
- Family: Sphaeroceridae
- Genus: Phthitia
- Subgenus: Rufolimosina Papp, 2008

Type species
- Phthitia ornata Papp, 2008

Subgenus of flies

Rufolimosina is a subgenus of flies belonging to the family Sphaeroceridae.

== Species ==
- P. ornata Papp, 2008
- P. oswaldi Papp, 2008
