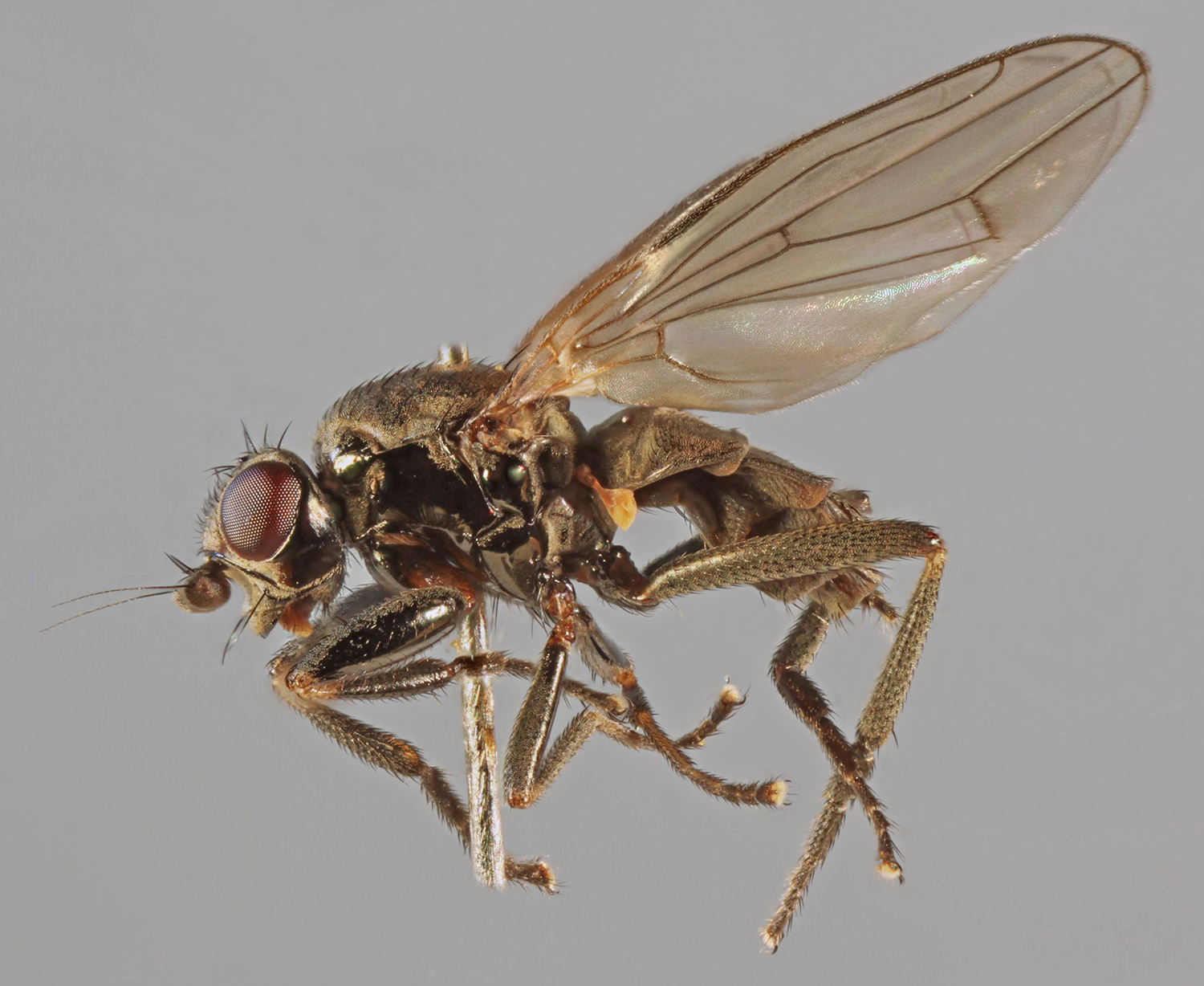

Scientific classification
- Domain: Eukaryota
- Kingdom: Animalia
- Phylum: Arthropoda
- Class: Insecta
- Order: Diptera
- Family: Sphaeroceridae
- Genus: Lotophila
- Species: L. atra

Binomial name
- Lotophila atra (Meigen, 1830)

Synonyms
- Borborus geniculata (Macquart, 1835)

= Lotophila atra =

Species of fly

Lotophila atra is a species of fly in the family Sphaeroceridae, the lesser dung flies. It is found in the Palearctic.

The larvae live in a wide range of moist decaying organic materials where they feed on micro-organisms.
