= Eriocharis lanaris =

Scientific classification
- Kingdom: Animalia
- Phylum: Arthropoda
- Class: Insecta
- Order: Coleoptera
- Suborder: Polyphaga
- Infraorder: Cucujiformia
- Family: Cerambycidae
- Genus: Eriocharis
- Species: E. lanaris

Binomial name
- Eriocharis lanaris (Blanchard, 1874)

Species of beetle

Eriocharis lanaris is a species of beetle in the family Cerambycidae. It was described by Blanchard in 1874.
