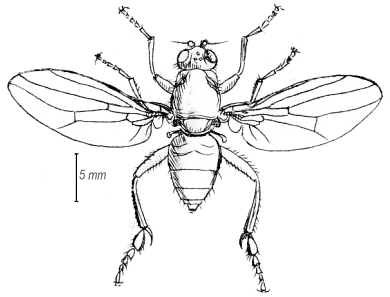

Scientific classification
- Kingdom: Animalia
- Phylum: Arthropoda
- Class: Insecta
- Order: Diptera
- Family: Sphaeroceridae
- Genus: Sphaerocera
- Species: S. curvipes

Binomial name
- Sphaerocera curvipes Latreille, 1805

= Sphaerocera curvipes =

Species of fly

Sphaerocera curvipes is a species of lesser dung flies, insects in the family Sphaeroceridae.

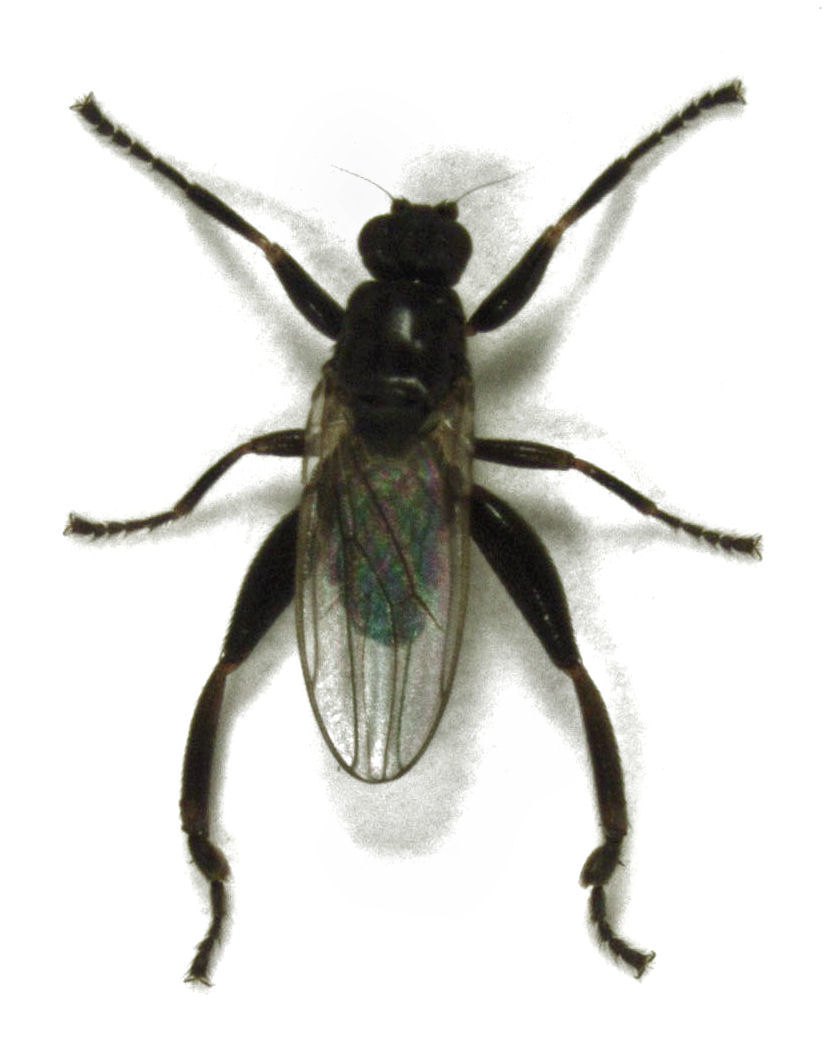
