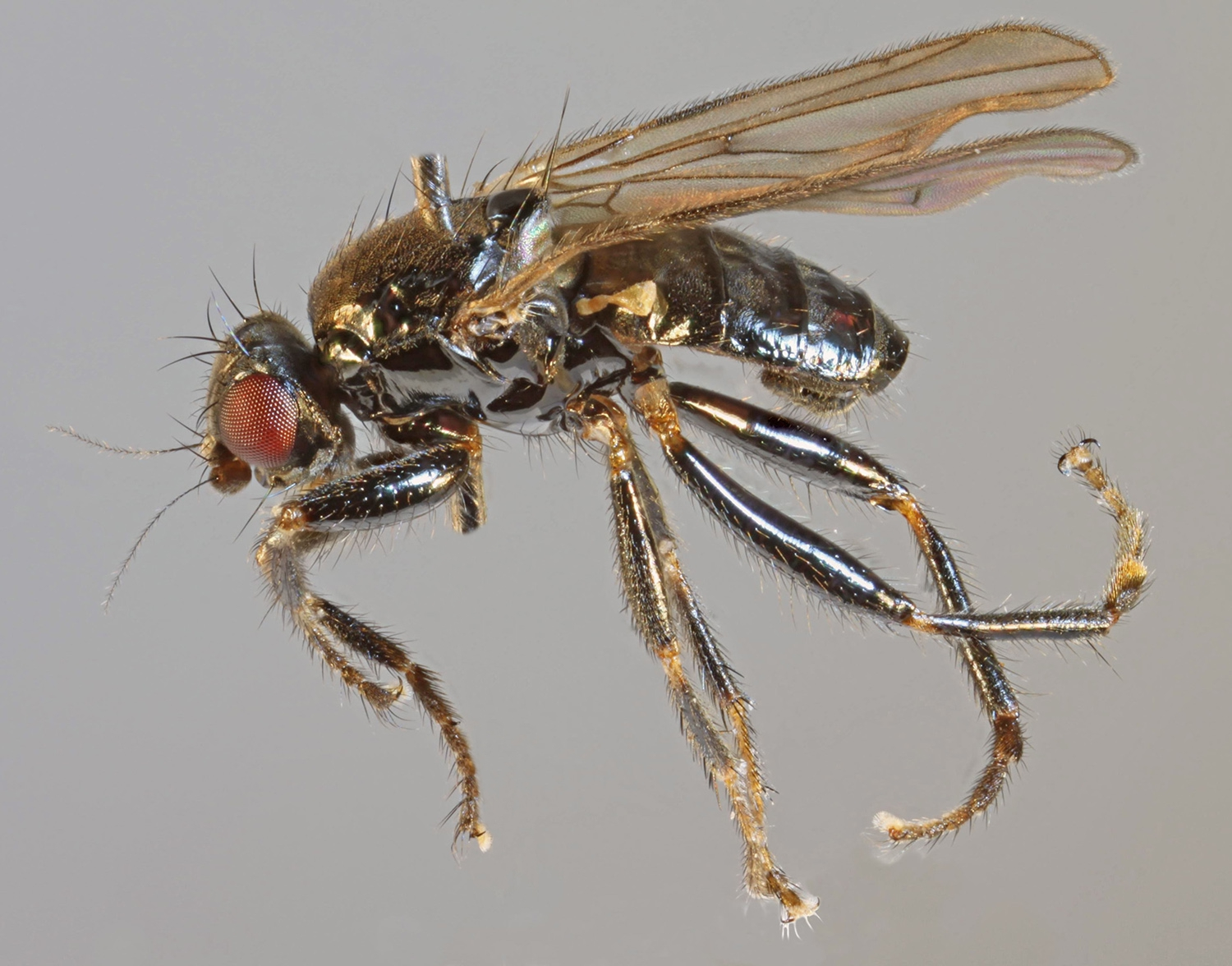
- Crumomyia fimetaria

Scientific classification
- Kingdom: Animalia
- Phylum: Arthropoda
- Class: Insecta
- Order: Diptera
- Family: Sphaeroceridae
- Subfamily: Copromyzinae
- Genus: Crumomyia; Macquart, 1835

Type species
- Borborus glacialis Meigen, 1830

Synonyms
- Apterina Macquart, 1835; Eriosoma Lioy, 1864; Fungobia Lioy, 1864; Saprobius Rondani, 1880; Speomyia Bezzi, 1914; Stratioborborus Duda, 1923; Paraspeomyia Duda, 1938

= Crumomyia =

Genus of flies

Crumomyia is a genus of flies belonging to the family Sphaeroceridae.

== Species ==
- C. absoloni (Bezzi, 1914)
- C. annulus (Walker, 1849)
- C. cavernicola (Papp & Roháček, 1983)
- C. deemingi (Hackman, 1965)
- C. fimetaria (Meigen, 1830)
- C. gelida (Hackman, 1965)
- C. glabrifrons (Meigen, 1830)
- C. glacialis (Meigen, 1830)
- C. hentscheli (Duda, 1938)
- C. hissarica Kuznetzova, 1993
- C. hungarica (Duda, 1938)
- C. immensa (Spuler, 1925)
- C. longiptera Kuznetzova, 1989
- C. maculipennis (Spuler, 1925)
- C. microps Roháček& Papp, 2000
- C. nartshukae Kuznetzova, 1989
- C. nigra (Meigen, 1830)
- C. nipponica (Richards, 1964)
- C. nitida (Meigen, 1830)
- C. notabilis (Collin, 1902)
- C. parentela (Séguy, 1963)
- C. pedestris (Meigen, 1830)
- C. peishulensis Kuznetzova, 1989
- C. pilosa Norrbom & Kim, 1985
- C. pollinodorsata (Papp, 1974)
- C. promethei (Nartshuk, 1970)
- C. pruinosa (Richards, 1932)
- C. rohaceki Norrbom & Kim, 1985
- C. roserii (Rondani, 1880)
- C. setitibialis (Spuler, 1925)
- C. subaptera (Malloch, 1923)
- C. tyrphophila Roháček, 1999
- C. zlobini Kuznetzova, 1995
- C. zuskai (Roháček, 1976)
