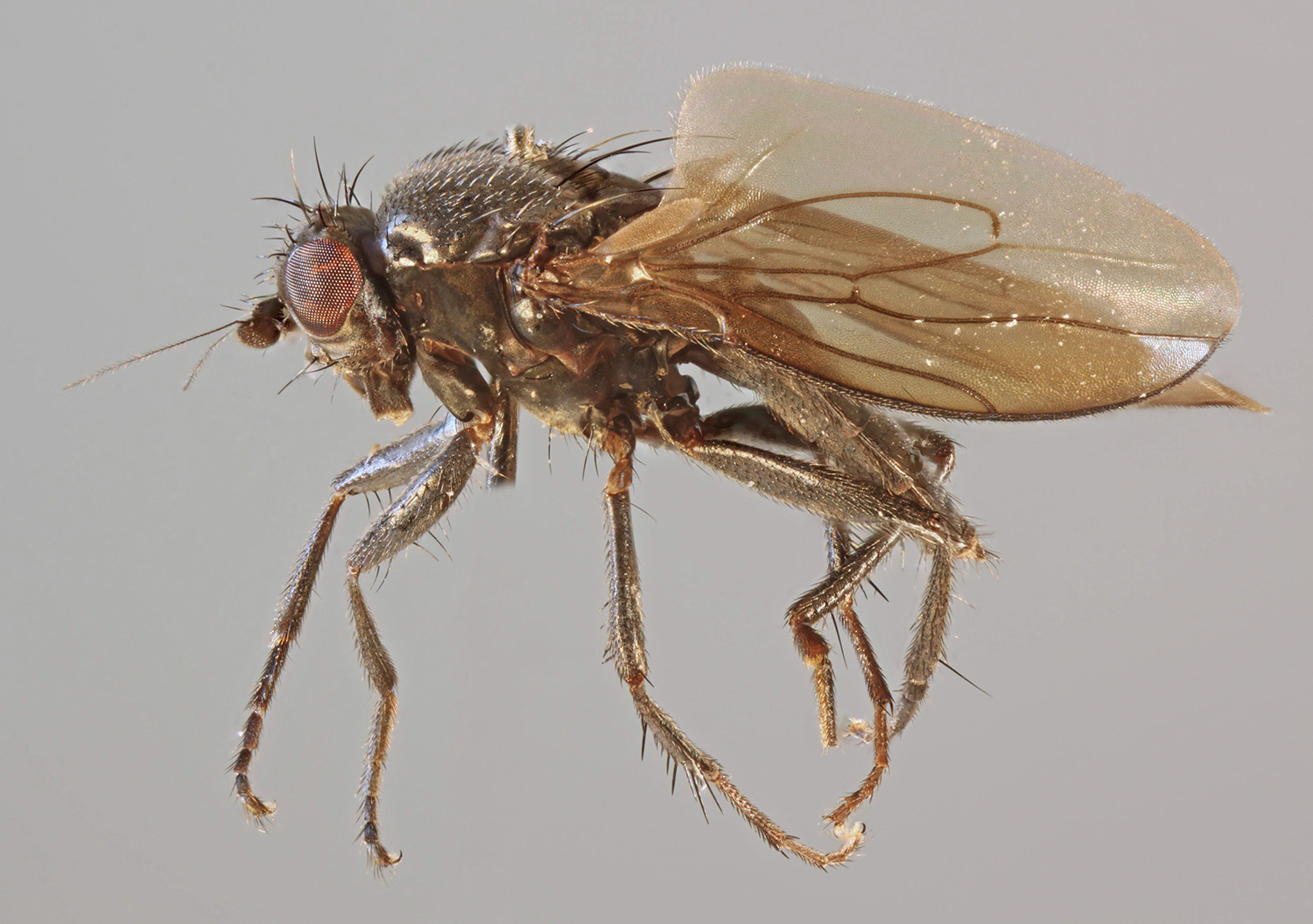

Scientific classification
- Kingdom: Animalia
- Phylum: Arthropoda
- Class: Insecta
- Order: Diptera
- Family: Sphaeroceridae
- Genus: Limosina
- Species: L. silvatica

Binomial name
- Limosina silvatica (Meigen, 1830)

Synonyms
- Borborus silvaticus Meigen, 1830

= Limosina silvatica =

Species of fly

Limosina silvatica is a species of fly in the family Sphaeroceridae, the lesser dung flies. It is found in the Palearctic. The larvae live in a wide range of moist decaying organic materials where they feed on micro-organisms.
