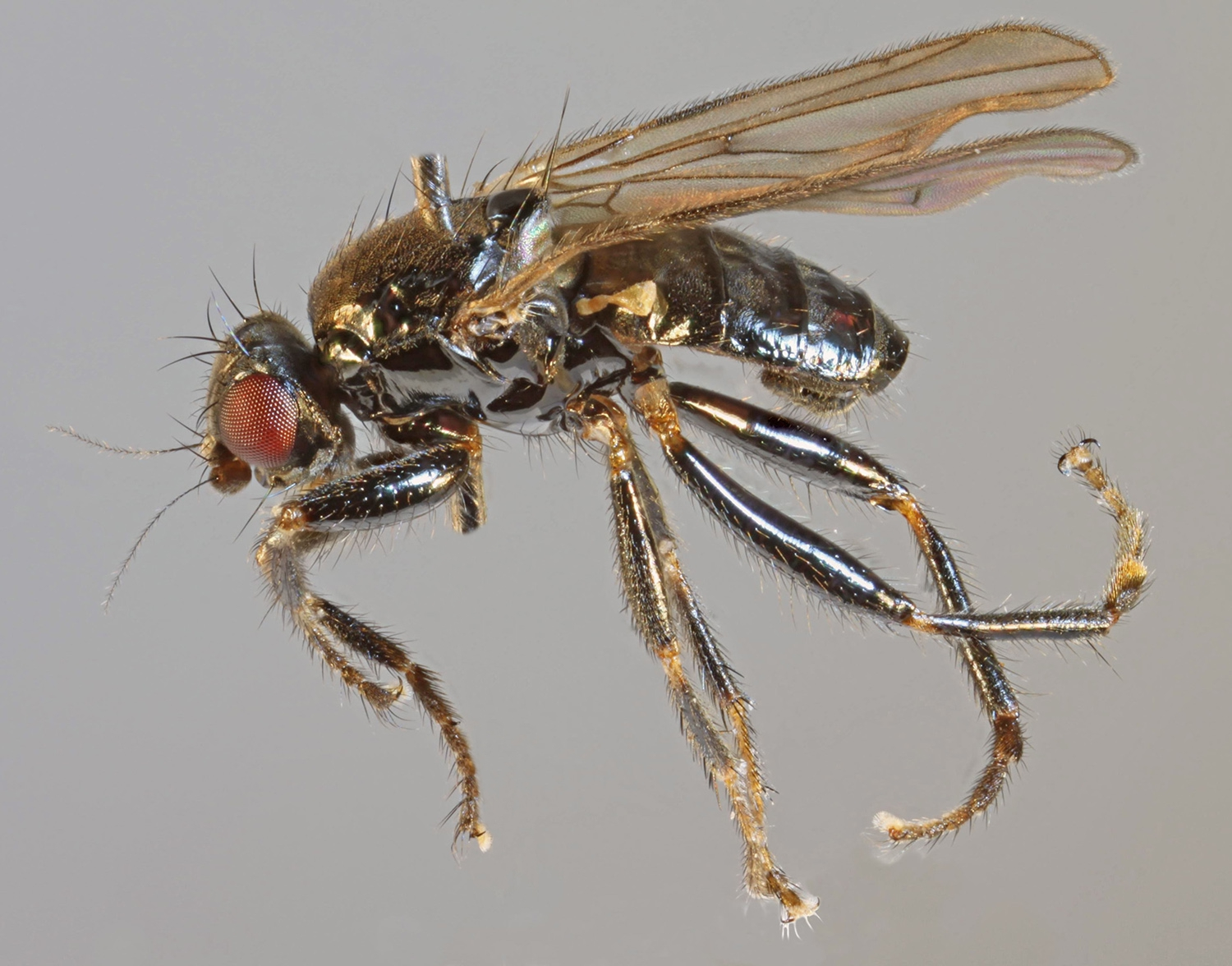

Scientific classification
- Kingdom: Animalia
- Phylum: Arthropoda
- Class: Insecta
- Order: Diptera
- Family: Sphaeroceridae
- Genus: Crumomyia
- Species: C. fimetaria

Binomial name
- Crumomyia fimetaria (Meigen, 1830)

Synonyms
- Borborus fimetarius Meigen, 1830; Borborus suillorum Haliday, 1836; Borborus costatus Meigen, 1838; Copromyza umbripennis Zetterstedt, 1847

= Crumomyia fimetaria =

Species of fly

Crumomyia fimetaria is a species of fly in the family Sphaeroceridae, the lesser dung flies. It is found in the Palearctic. The larvae live in a wide range of moist decaying organic materials where they feed on micro-organisms.
