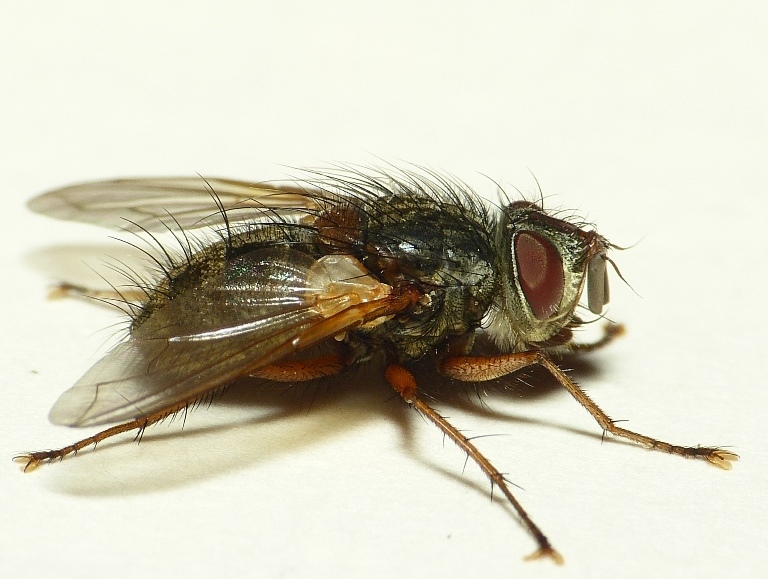
- Phryno vetula

Scientific classification
- Kingdom: Animalia
- Phylum: Arthropoda
- Class: Insecta
- Order: Diptera
- Family: Tachinidae
- Subfamily: Exoristinae
- Tribe: Goniini
- Genus: Phryno
- Species: P. vetula

Binomial name
- Phryno vetula (Meigen, 1824)

Synonyms
- Tachina vetula Meigen, 1824; Exorista fulvipes Rondani, 1859; Phryno agilis Robineau-Desvoidy, 1830; Phryno aurulenta Robineau-Desvoidy, 1849; Phryno brunea Robineau-Desvoidy, 1830; Tachina fulvipes Meigen, 1824

= Phryno vetula =

Species of fly

Phryno vetula is a species of bristle fly in the family Tachinidae.

== Distribution ==
British Isles, Czech Republic, Hungary, Lithuania, Poland, Romania, Slovakia, Ukraine, Denmark, Bosnia and Herzegovina, Bulgaria, Croatia, Greece, Italy, Spain, Turkey, Austria, Belgium, France, Germany, Netherlands, Switzerland, Russia, Transcaucasia, China.
