= Safaria =

Scientific classification
- Kingdom: Animalia
- Phylum: Arthropoda
- Class: Insecta
- Order: Diptera
- Family: Sphaeroceridae
- Subfamily: Sphaerocerinae
- Genus: Safaria; Richards, 1950

Type species
- Safaria forcipata Richards, 1950

Genus of flies

Safaria is a genus of flies belonging to the family of the Sphaeroceridae.

== Species ==
- Safaria abyssinica Richards, 1951
- Safaria brachyptera Richards, 1966
- Safaria chelata Richards, 1950
- Safaria cornuta (Duda, 1926)
- Safaria forcipata Richards, 1950
- Safaria kistneri Richards, 1968
- Safaria liberiensis Richards, 1968
- Safaria saegeri (Vanschuytbroeck, 1959)
