= Phthitia (Phthitia) =

Scientific classification
- Kingdom: Animalia
- Phylum: Arthropoda
- Clade: Pancrustacea
- Class: Insecta
- Order: Diptera
- Family: Sphaeroceridae
- Genus: Phthitia
- Subgenus: Phthitia; Enderlein, 1938

Type species
- Phthitia venosa Enderlein, 1938

Synonyms
- Phtitia Hackman, 1969; Pterodrepana Enderlein, 1938; Aubertinia Richards, 1951

Subgenus of flies

Phthitia is a subgenus of flies belonging to the family Sphaeroceridae.

== Species ==
- P. alexandri Richards, 1955
- P. charpentieri Marshall & Smith, 1995
- P. cortesi Marshall & Smith, 1995
- P. gonzalezi Marshall & Smith, 1995
- P. miradorensis Marshall & Smith, 1995
- P. sanctaehelenae (Richards, 1951)
- P. selkirki (Enderlein, 1938)
- P. venosa Enderlein, 1938
