= Eriocharis devestivus =

Scientific classification
- Domain: Eukaryota
- Kingdom: Animalia
- Phylum: Arthropoda
- Class: Insecta
- Order: Coleoptera
- Suborder: Polyphaga
- Infraorder: Cucujiformia
- Family: Cerambycidae
- Genus: Eriocharis
- Species: E. devestivus

Binomial name
- Eriocharis devestivus Monné & Martins, 1973

Species of beetle

Eriocharis devestivus is a species of beetle in the family Cerambycidae. It was described by Monné & Martins in 1973.
