= Phthitia (Kimosina) =

Scientific classification
- Kingdom: Animalia
- Phylum: Arthropoda
- Clade: Pancrustacea
- Class: Insecta
- Order: Diptera
- Family: Sphaeroceridae
- Genus: Phthitia
- Subgenus: Kimosina; Roháček, 1983

Type species
- Limosina plumosula Rondani, 1880

Synonyms
- Kimosina Roháček, 1982

Subgenus of flies

Kimosina is a subgenus of flies belonging to the family Sphaeroceridae.

== Species ==
- P. antillensis Marshall in Marshall & Smith, 1992
- P. antipoda (Roháček, 1984)
- P. bicalyx Marshall in Marshall & Smith, 1992
- P. bicornis Su & Liu, 2009
- P. cercipilis Marshall in Marshall & Smith, 1992
- P. chilenica (Duda, 1925)
- P. ciliata (Duda, 1918)
- P. digiseta Marshall in Marshall & Smith, 1992
- P. digistylus Marshall in Marshall & Smith, 1992
- P. emarginata Marshall, 2009
- P. glabrescens (Villeneuve, 1917)
- P. levigena (Spuler, 1925)
- P. lineasterna Marshall in Marshall & Smith, 1992
- P. lobocercus Marshall in Marshall & Smith, 1992
- P. longisetosa (Dahl, 1909)
- P. luteocercus Marshall in Marshall & Smith, 1992
- P. luteofrons Marshall in Marshall & Smith, 1992
- P. merida Marshall in Marshall & Smith, 1992
- P. mulroneyi Marshall in Marshall & Smith, 1992
- P. nigrifacies Marshall in Marshall & Smith, 1992
- P. notthomasi Marshall in Marshall & Smith, 1992
- P. obunca Marshall in Marshall & Smith, 1992
- P. occimosa Marshall in Marshall & Smith, 1992
- P. ovicercus Marshall in Marshall & Smith, 1992
- P. plesiocercus Marshall, 2009
- P. plumosula (Rondani, 1880)
- P. sicana (Munari, 1988)
- P. soikai (Munari, 1990)
- P. spinicalyx Marshall in Marshall & Smith, 1992
- P. squamosa Marshall in Marshall & Winchester, 1999
- P. thomasi (Harrison, 1959)
