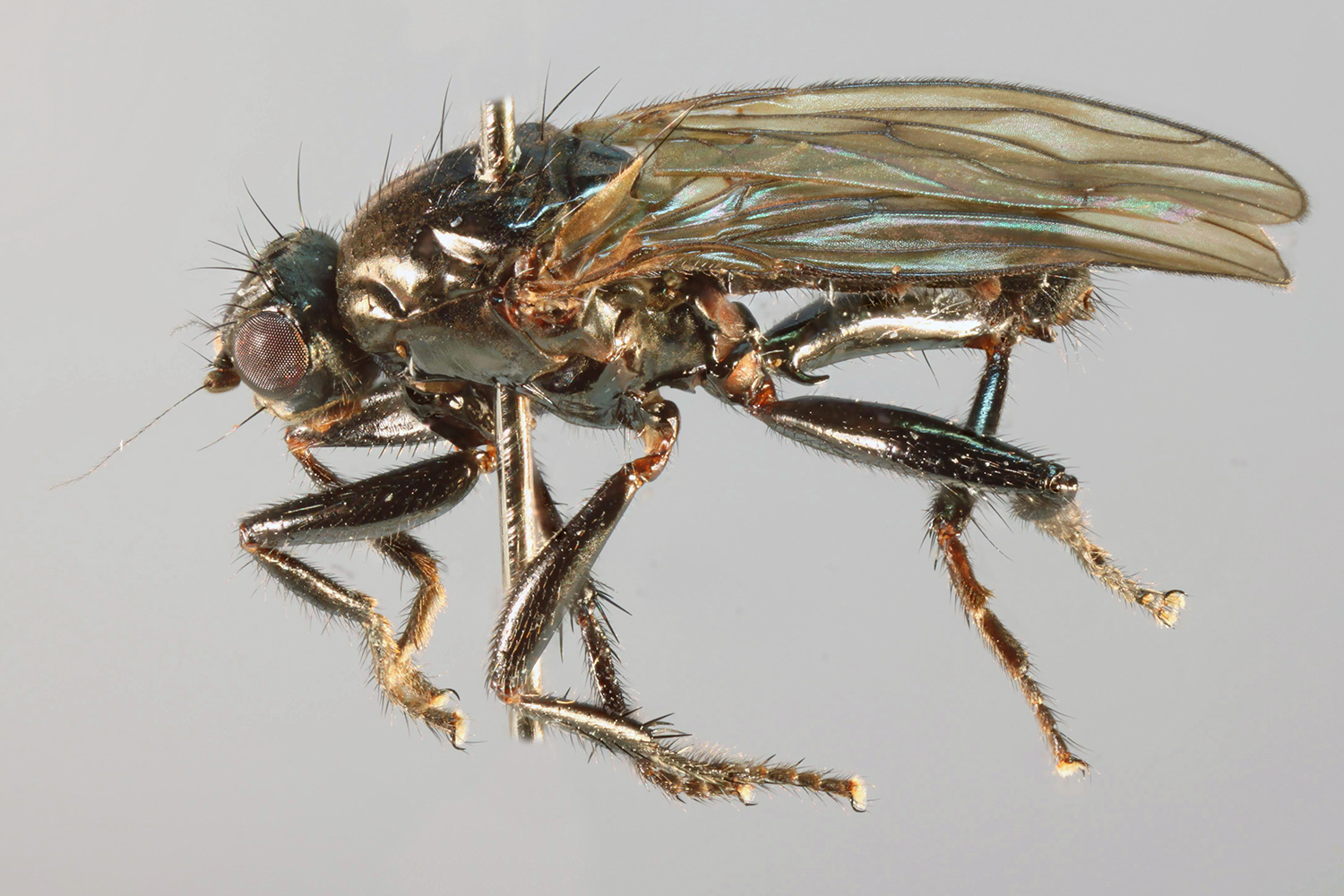

Scientific classification
- Kingdom: Animalia
- Phylum: Arthropoda
- Class: Insecta
- Order: Diptera
- Family: Sphaeroceridae
- Genus: Crumomyia
- Species: C. nitida

Binomial name
- Crumomyia nitida Meigen, 1830

= Crumomyia nitida =

Species of fly

Crumomyia nitida is a species of fly in the family Sphaeroceridae, the lesser dung flies. It is found in the Palearctic. The larvae live in a wide range of moist decaying organic materials where they feed on micro-organisms.
