= Phthitia (Alimosina) =

Scientific classification
- Kingdom: Animalia
- Phylum: Arthropoda
- Clade: Pancrustacea
- Class: Insecta
- Order: Diptera
- Family: Sphaeroceridae
- Genus: Phthitia
- Subgenus: Alimosina; Roháček, 1983

Type species
- Borborus empiricus Hutton, 1901

Synonyms
- Alimosina Roháček, 1982

Subgenus of flies

Alimosina is a subgenus of flies belonging to the family Sphaeroceridae.

== Species ==
- P. empirica (Hutton, 1901)
- P. rennelli (Harrison, 1964)
