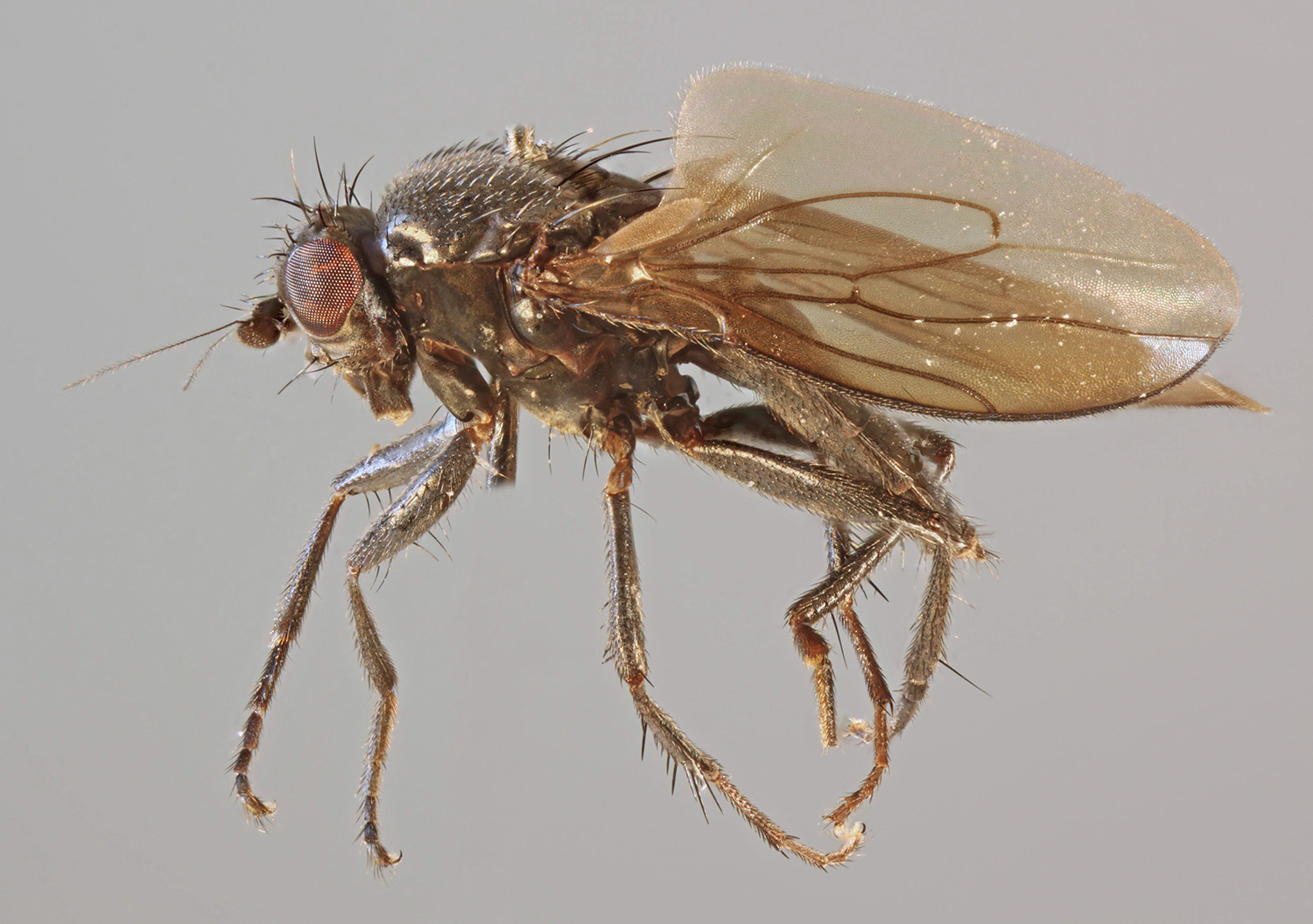
- Limosina silvatica

Scientific classification
- Kingdom: Animalia
- Phylum: Arthropoda
- Class: Insecta
- Order: Diptera
- Family: Sphaeroceridae
- Subfamily: Limosininae
- Genus: Limosina; Macquart, 1835

Type species
- Borborus silvaticus Meigen, 1830

Synonyms
- Trichogaster Lioy, 1864; Scotophilella Duda, 1918

= Limosina =

Genus of flies

Limosina is a genus of flies belonging to the family Sphaeroceridae.

== Species ==
These 160 species belong to the genus Limosina:

Subgenus Kimosina
Limosina antipoda (Roháček, 1984)
Limosina levigena (Spuler, 1925)
Limosina pappi (Roháček, 1983)
Limosina rennelli (Harrison, 1964)
Limosina sicana (Munari, 1988)
Limosina thomasi (Harrison, 1959)
Subgenus Limosina

Limosina anomala (Richards, 1966)
Limosina boliviensis (Duda, 1925)
Limosina carbonicolor (Richards, 1959)
Limosina cherangani (Richards, 1938)
Limosina chilenica (Duda, 1925)
Limosina citrina (Richards, 1968)
Limosina consanguinea Blanchard, 1854
Limosina costata (Richards, 1968)
Limosina curvitarsis (Duda, 1925)
Limosina darwini (Richards, 1931)
Limosina dolichoptera (Richards, 1963)
Limosina flavibacca (Duda, 1925)
Limosina fusca (Duda, 1925)
Limosina fuscana (Richards, 1965)
Limosina halterata (Richards, 1966)
Limosina heteroneuroides (Duda, 1925)
Limosina keniaca (Richards, 1965)
Limosina kivuensis Vanschuytbroeck, 1950
Limosina longipennis (Duda, 1925)
Limosina maculata Vanschuytbroeck, 1950
Limosina minimella (Richards, 1965)
Limosina mollis (Richards, 1963)
Limosina nigroscutellata (Duda, 1925)
Limosina niveipennis Malloch, 1913
Limosina obscuripennis (Hackman, 1967)
Limosina opaca (Duda, 1925)
Limosina orbicularis Becker, 1919
Limosina pallicornis (Malloch, 1914)
Limosina paraminima (Duda, 1925)
Limosina paramoesta (Duda, 1925)
Limosina phycophila (Richards, 1963)
Limosina piscina (Richards, 1938)
Limosina plumbea (Duda, 1925)
Limosina plumiseta (Duda, 1925)
Limosina propulsa (Duda, 1925)
Limosina pumila Williston, 1896
Limosina quadrisetosa (Malloch, 1914)
Limosina regularis (Malloch, 1914)
Limosina subbrevipennis Frey, 1954
Limosina umbrosa (Richards, 1968)
Limosina xanthographa (Richards, 1959)

Subgenus Scotophilella
Limosina pseudoleucoptera Duda, 1924
Limosina simplicipes (Duda, 1918)
Limosina villosa Duda, 1918
Not assigned to a subgenus

Limosina abbreviata (Fallén, 1823)
Limosina aeneiventris Stenhammar, 1854
Limosina agilis (Contarini, 1847)
Limosina alloneura (Richards, 1952)
Limosina arcuata Macquart, 1835
Limosina atrata (Robineau-Desvoidy, 1830)
Limosina baezi Papp, 1977
Limosina bequaerti (Villeneuve, 1917)
Limosina bovina (Robineau-Desvoidy, 1830)
Limosina brunneiptera Papp, 1973
Limosina cadaverina (Robineau-Desvoidy, 1830)
Limosina calcarifera Roháček, 1975
Limosina cambrica (Richards, 1929)
Limosina ciliata Duda, 1918
Limosina claripennis (Robineau-Desvoidy, 1830)
Limosina coei Deeming, 1969
Limosina collini (Richards, 1929)
Limosina coprina (Robineau-Desvoidy, 1830)
Limosina curtiventris Stenhammar, 1854
Limosina czernyi Duda, 1918
Limosina czizeki Duda, 1918
Limosina denticulata Duda, 1924
Limosina diadema Stenhammar, 1854
Limosina divergens Papp, 1973
Limosina dudai Papp, 1978
Limosina duplisetaria Papp, 1973
Limosina eclecta Papp, 1973
Limosina flavescens (Lioy, 1864)
Limosina flaviceps Zetterstedt, 1847
Limosina ghaznavi Papp, 1978
Limosina glabra Meigen, 1838
Limosina glabrocercata Papp, 1973
Limosina glarescens (Villeneuve, 1917)
Limosina hackmani Roháček, 1977
Limosina hirtipes (Robineau-Desvoidy, 1830)
Limosina horrida Roháček, 1978
Limosina hungarica (Villeneuve, 1917)
Limosina impressa Meigen, 1838
Limosina interima Papp, 1973
Limosina karelica Papp, 1979
Limosina kaszabi Papp, 1973
Limosina latipes Duda, 1925
Limosina limpidipennis (Robineau-Desvoidy, 1830)
Limosina lineatarsata Papp, 1973
Limosina litoralis Stenhammar, 1854
Limosina longecostata Duda, 1938
Limosina longicornuta Papp, 1973
Limosina ludibunda (Robineau-Desvoidy, 1830)
Limosina lutea (Richards, 1963)
Limosina macrosetitarsalis Papp, 1974
Limosina magna Brunetti, 1913
Limosina manicata (Richards, 1927)
Limosina meijerei Duda, 1918
Limosina merdaria (Robineau-Desvoidy, 1830)
Limosina meszarosi Papp, 1974
Limosina microtophila Papp, 1973
Limosina minima Macquart, 1835
Limosina moesta Villeneuve, 1918
Limosina monorbiseta Deeming, 1969
Limosina nitens Stenhammar, 1854
Limosina nitida (Robineau-Desvoidy, 1830)
Limosina notatipennis Brunetti, 1924
Limosina nudipes (Robineau-Desvoidy, 1830)
Limosina obtusipennis Stenhammar, 1854
Limosina pallipes (Robineau-Desvoidy, 1830)
Limosina palmata (Richards, 1927)
Limosina paraczizeki Papp, 1973
Limosina paraflavipes Papp, 1973
Limosina parafungicola Papp, 1974
Limosina paralbinveris Papp, 1973
Limosina paralineatarsata Papp, 1973
Limosina parapenetralis Papp, 1973
Limosina parapusio Dahl, 1909
Limosina paratalparum Papp, 1973
Limosina paravitripennis Papp, 1973
Limosina pseudoalbinervis Papp, 1973
Limosina pseudoluteilabris Papp, 1973
Limosina pseudonivalis Dahl, 1909
Limosina pseudosetitarsalis Papp, 1973
Limosina pteremoides Papp, 1973
Limosina ptermoides Papp, 1973
Limosina pumilio (Meigen, 1830)
Limosina putris (Robineau-Desvoidy, 1830)
Limosina quisquilia Haliday, 1836
Limosina rohaceki Papp, 1978
Limosina rozkosnyi Roháček, 1975
Limosina rufa Duda, 1925
Limosina rufilabris Stenhammar, 1854
Limosina rufipes Meigen, 1838
Limosina scutellata (Meigen, 1835)
Limosina secundaria Duda, 1918
Limosina setilaterata Papp, 1973
Limosina setitarsalis Papp, 1973
Limosina silvatica (Meigen, 1830)
Limosina similissima Papp, 1974
Limosina simplex (Richards, 1929)
Limosina soikai (Munari, 1990)
Limosina spinifemorata Papp, 1973
Limosina spinosa Collin, 1930
Limosina splendens (Duda, 1928)
Limosina subinerea (Brullé, 1833)
Limosina submaculata Duda, 1938
Limosina talparum (Richards, 1927)
Limosina tenebrosa Brunetti, 1924
Limosina terrestris Papp, 1979
Limosina tibialis (Robineau-Desvoidy, 1830)
Limosina tristis Meigen, 1838
Limosina unica Papp, 1973
Limosina v-atrum (Villeneuve, 1917)
Limosina verticella Stenhammar, 1854
