= Amauromyza pleuralis =

Scientific classification
- Kingdom: Animalia
- Phylum: Arthropoda
- Class: Insecta
- Order: Diptera
- Family: Agromyzidae
- Subfamily: Phytomyzinae
- Genus: Amauromyza
- Species: A. pleuralis

Binomial name
- Amauromyza pleuralis (Malloch, 1914)

Species of fly

Amauromyza pleuralis is a species of fly in the family Agromyzidae.

== Distribution ==
Canada, United States.
