= Collimosina =

Scientific classification
- Kingdom: Animalia
- Phylum: Arthropoda
- Class: Insecta
- Order: Diptera
- Family: Sphaeroceridae
- Genus: Phthitia
- Subgenus: Collimosina Roháček, 1983

Type species
- Limosina spinosa Collin, 1930

Synonyms
- Collimosina Roháček, 1982

Subgenus of flies

Collimosina is a subgenus of flies belonging to the family Sphaeroceridae.

== Species ==
- P. quadricercus Marshall in Marshall & Smith, 1992
- P. spinosa (Collin, 1930)
