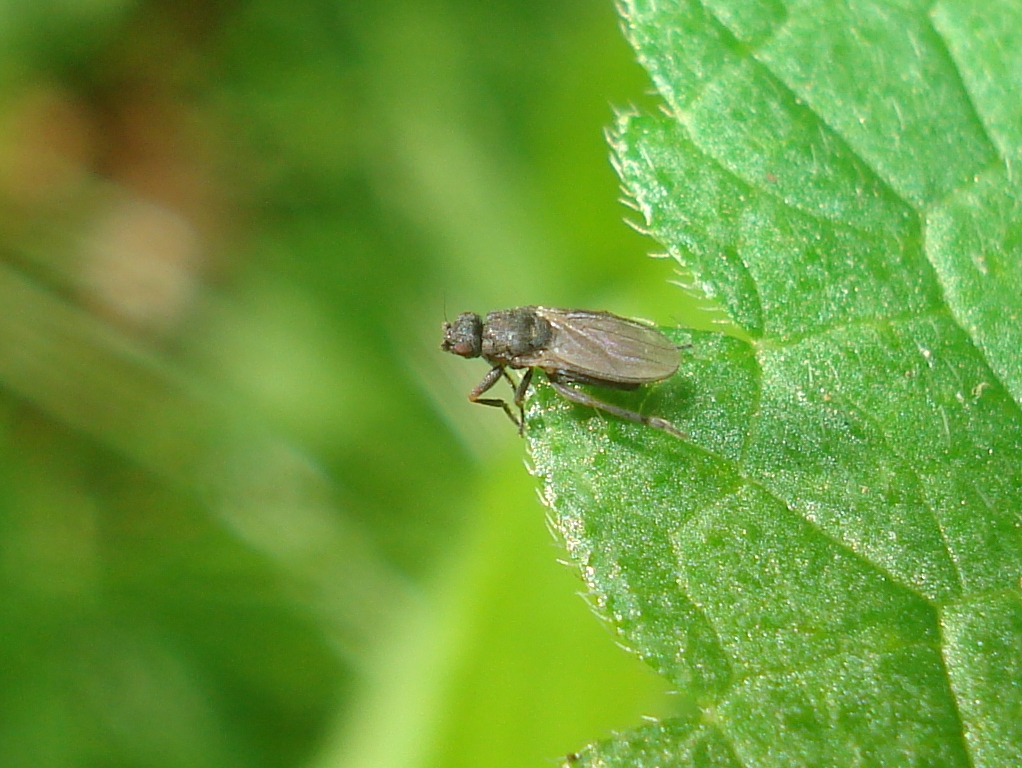
- Ischiolepta sp.

Scientific classification
- Kingdom: Animalia
- Phylum: Arthropoda
- Class: Insecta
- Order: Diptera
- Family: Sphaeroceridae
- Subfamily: Sphaerocerinae
- Genus: Ischiolepta; Lioy, 1864

Type species
- Borborus denticulatus Meigen, 1838

Synonyms
- Ischiogaster Richards, 1930; Lotobia Richards, 1930

= Ischiolepta =

Genus of flies

Ischiolepta is a genus of flies belonging to the family Sphaeroceridae.

== Species ==
- I. baloghi Papp, 2003
- I. barberi Han & Marshall, 1992
- I. biuncialis Dong, Yang & Hayashi, 2007
- I. crenata (Meigen, 1838)
- I. cyrtopyge Buck & Marshall, 2002
- I. denticulata (Meigen, 1830)
- I. draskovitsae Rohček & Papp, 1984
- I. flava (Vanschuytbroeck, 1951)
- I. horrida Papp, 1973
- I. hyalophora Buck & Marshall, 2002
- I. indica Papp, 1993
- I. intermedia Han & Kim, 1990
- I. ischnocnemis Buck & Marshall, 2002
- I. janssensi (Vanschuytbroeck, 1948)
- I. lama Han & Marshall, 1992
- I. loebli Rohček & Papp, 1984
- I. longispina Papp, 1973
- I. micropyga (Duda, 1938)
- I. minuscula Papp, 1993
- I. nitida (Duda, 1920)
- I. oedopoda Papp, 1972
- I. orientalis (de Meijere, 1908)
- I. pansa Han & Kim, 1990
- I. peregovitsi Papp, 2003
- I. polyankistrion Buck & Marshall, 2002
- I. pusilla (Fallén, 1820)
- I. scabifer Buck & Marshall, 2002
- I. scabra (Spuler, 1924)
- I. scabricula (Haliday, 1836)
- I. stuarti Han & Kim, 1990
- I. vanschuytbroecki Papp, 1978
- I. vaporariorum (Haliday, 1836)
