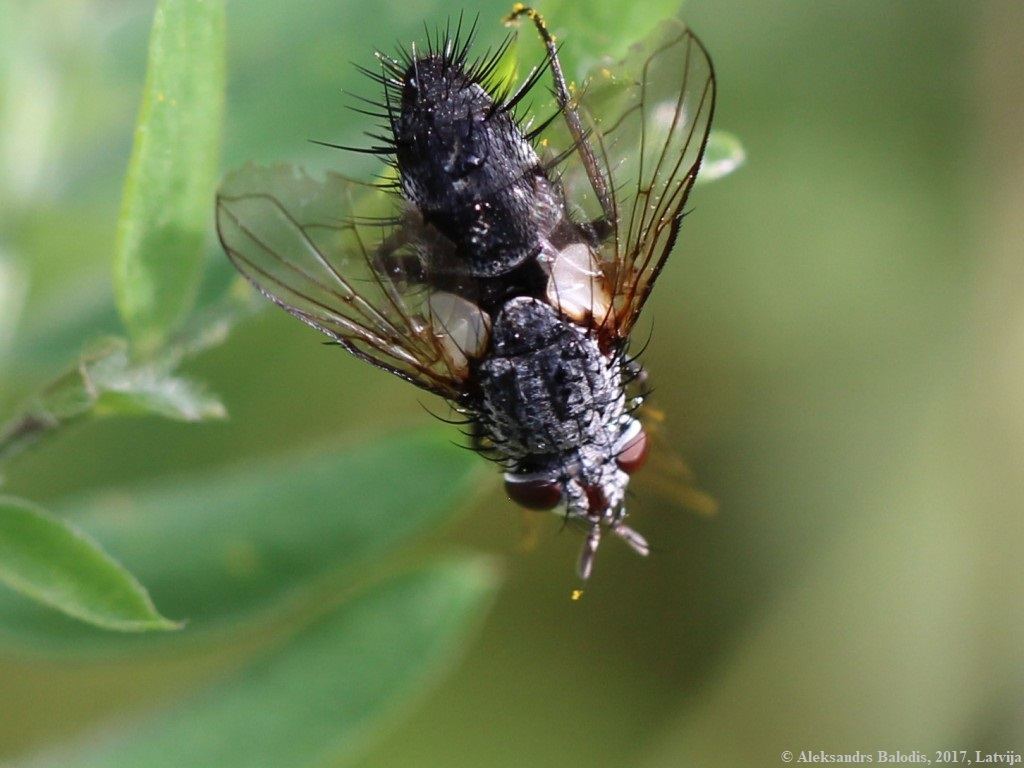

Scientific classification
- Kingdom: Animalia
- Phylum: Arthropoda
- Class: Insecta
- Order: Diptera
- Family: Tachinidae
- Subfamily: Tachininae
- Tribe: Leskiini
- Genus: Demoticus
- Species: D. plebejus

Binomial name
- Demoticus plebejus (Fallén, 1810)

Synonyms
- Tachina plebejus Fallén, 1810; Tachina hospes Meigen, 1835; Myobia aequa Meigen, 1838; Tachina mesula Walker, 1849; Myobia arcuata Macquart, 1854; Myobia pulverulenta Macquart, 1854

= Demoticus plebejus =

Species of fly

Demoticus plebejus is a species of bristle fly in the family Tachinidae.

== Distribution ==
China, British Isles, Czech Republic, Estonia, Hungary, Latvia, Poland, Romania, Slovakia, Ukraine, Denmark, Finland, Norway, Sweden, Bosnia and Herzegovina, Bulgaria, Croatia, Italy, Serbia, Slovenia, Spain, Austria, Belgium, France, Germany, Netherlands, Switzerland, Russia, Transcaucasia.
