= Lotobia =

Scientific classification
- Kingdom: Animalia
- Phylum: Arthropoda
- Class: Insecta
- Order: Diptera
- Family: Sphaeroceridae
- Subfamily: Sphaerocerinae
- Genus: Lotobia; Lioy, 1864

Type species
- Borborus pallidiventris Meigen, 1830

Synonyms
- Allosphaerocera Hendel, 1920

Genus of flies

Lotobia is a genus of flies belonging to the family Sphaeroceridae.

== Species ==
- L. africana (Becker, 1907)
- L. alpina Kim & Han, 1990
- L. arcuata (Séguy, 1933)
- L. asiatica Hayashi & Papp, 2004
- L. dolabrata Kim & Han, 1990
- L. dura Vanschuytbroeck, 1959
- L. elegans Vanschuytbroeck, 1959
- L. endrodyi Papp, 1978
- L. eritima Kim & Han, 1990
- L. flavofemorata Kim & Han, 1990
- L. halidayi Kim & Han, 1990
- L. kivuensis Vanschuytbroeck, 1948
- L. kovacsi Papp, 1978
- L. latipes Hayashi & Papp, 2004
- L. moyoensis Vanschuytbroeck, 1959
- L. nigeriana Han & Kim, 1996
- L. nigra Kim & Han, 1990
- L. pallidiventris (Meigen, 1830)
- L. saegeri Kim & Han, 1990
- L. simia (Séguy, 1933)
- L. similiter Vanschuytbroeck, 1959
- L. southafricana Han & Kim, 1996
- L. supraelegans Hayashi & Papp, 2004
- L. temboensis Vanschuytbroeck, 1959
- L. turbatrix Kim & Han, 1990
- L. upembaensis Vanschuytbroeck, 1959
- L. wittei Kim & Han, 1990
