= Climate: Long range Investigation, Mapping, and Prediction =

Research project

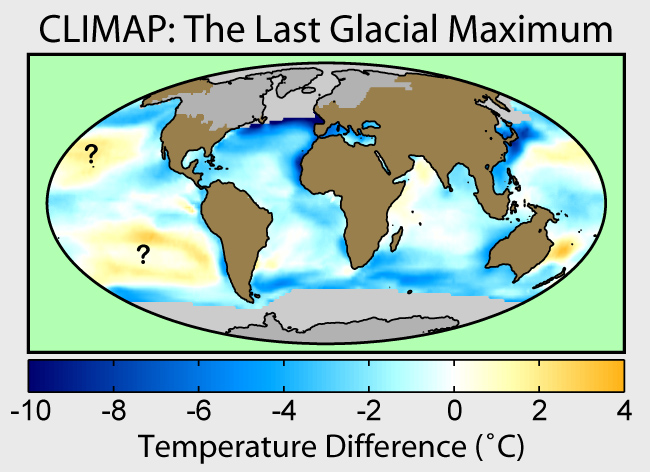
CLIMAP map of ice sheets, sea temperature changes, and changes in the outline of coastal regions during the last glacial.

Climate: Long range Investigation, Mapping, and Prediction, known as CLIMAP, was a major research project of the 1970s and 80s to produce a map of climate conditions during the Last Glacial Maximum. The project was funded by the National Science Foundation as part of the International Decade of Ocean Exploration (1970s) and is based in large part of the collection and analysis of a very large number of sediment cores to create a snapshot of conditions across the oceans. The CLIMAP project also resulted in maps of vegetative zones across the continents and the estimated extent of glaciation at the time. Most CLIMAP results aim to describe the Earth as it was 18 thousand years ago, but there was also an analysis to look at conditions during the previous interglacial—120 thousand years ago (CLIMAP 1981).

CLIMAP has been a cornerstone of paleoclimate research and remains the most used sea surface temperature reconstruction of the global ocean during the last glacial maximum (Yin and Battisti 2001), but it has also been persistently controversial. CLIMAP resulted in estimates of global cooling of only 3.0 ± 0.6 °C relative to the modern day (Hoffert and Covey 1992). The climate change during an ice age that occurs far from the continental ice sheets themselves is believed to be primarily controlled by changes in greenhouse gases, hence the conditions during the last glacial maximum provide a natural experiment for measuring the impact of changes in greenhouse gases on climate. The cited estimates of 3.0 °C implies a climate sensitivity to carbon dioxide changes at the low end of the range proposed by the Intergovernmental Panel on Climate Change.

However, CLIMAP also suggested that some of the tropics and in particular much of the Pacific Ocean were warmer than they are today. To date, no climate model has been able to reproduce the proposed warming in the Pacific (Yin and Battisti 2001), with most preferring a several degree cooling. Also, it appears that climate models which are forced to match the CLIMAP sea surface measurements are too warm to match estimates for changes at continental locations (Pinot et al. 1999). This suggests that either climate model design is missing some important unknown factor, or CLIMAP systematically overestimated the temperatures in the tropical oceans during the last glacial, though there is at present no consistent explanation for why or how this should have happened. Unfortunately cost and difficulty of collecting sediment cores from the open Pacific has limited the availability of samples that might help to confirm or disprove these observations. If the Pacific reconstruction is assumed to be in error, it would result in a larger climate sensitivity to changes in greenhouse gases.
