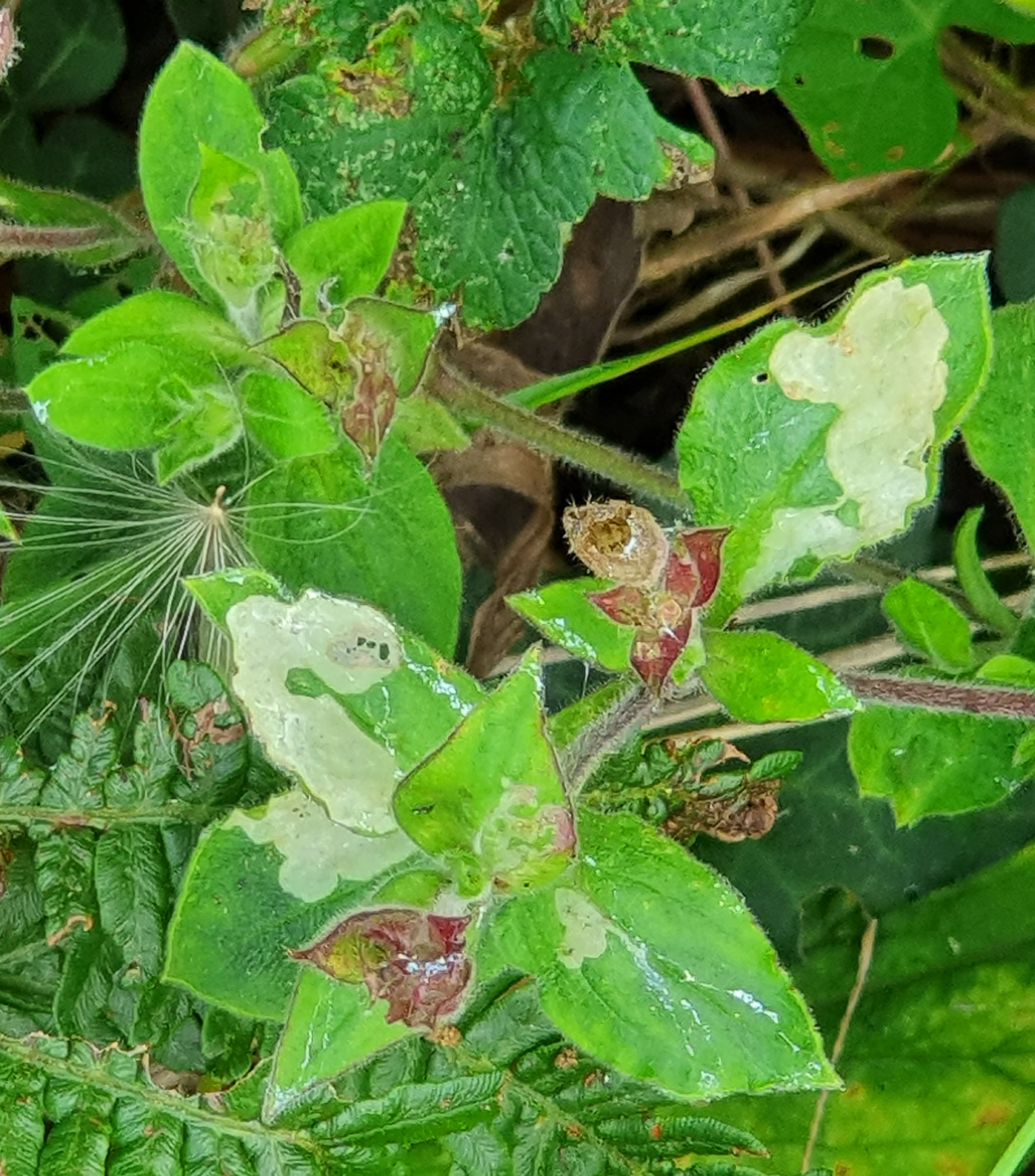
- Amauromyza flavifrons mines on red campion

Scientific classification
- Kingdom: Animalia
- Phylum: Arthropoda
- Class: Insecta
- Order: Diptera
- Family: Agromyzidae
- Genus: Amauromyza
- Species: A. flavifrons

Binomial name
- Amauromyza flavifrons (Meigen, 1830)

Synonyms
- Agromyza exigua Meigen, 1830; Agromyza xanthocephala Brischke, 1881; Phytomyza betae Macquart, 1855

= Amauromyza flavifrons =

Species of fly

Amauromyza flavifrons is a species of fly in the family Agromyzidae.

== Distribution ==
Canada, United States, Palaearctic.
