= Afromyia =

Scientific classification
- Kingdom: Animalia
- Phylum: Arthropoda
- Class: Insecta
- Order: Diptera
- Family: Sphaeroceridae
- Subfamily: Sphaerocerinae
- Genus: Afromyia; Kim, 1968

Type species
- Sphaerocera ruandana Vanschuytbroeck, 1948

Genus of flies

Afromyia is a genus of flies belonging to the family Sphaeroceridae.

== Species ==
- Afromyia flavimana Papp, 1978
- Afromyia ghanensis Papp, 1978
- Afromyia jeanneli (Richards, 1938)
- Afromyia longipes (Richards, 1951)
- Afromyia ruandana (Vanschuytbroeck, 1948)
- Afromyia wittei (Vanschuytbroeck, 1948)
