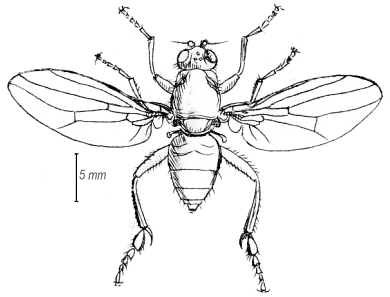
- Sphaeocera curvipes

Scientific classification
- Kingdom: Animalia
- Phylum: Arthropoda
- Class: Insecta
- Order: Diptera
- Family: Sphaeroceridae
- Subfamily: Sphaerocerinae
- Genus: Sphaerocera; Latreille, 1804

Type species
- Sphaerocera curvipes Latreille, 1804

Synonyms
- Cypsela Meigen, 1800; Borborus Meigen, 1803

= Sphaerocera =

Genus of flies

Sphaerocera is a genus of flies belonging to the family Sphaeroceridae.

== Species ==
- Sphaerocera curvipes Latreille, 1805
- Sphaerocera elephantis Hayashi, 1990
- Sphaerocera flaviceps Malloch, 1925
- Sphaerocera monilis Haliday, 1836
- Sphaerocera pseudomonilis Nishijima & Yamazaki, 1984
- Sphaerocera tuberculosa Kim, 1968
