= Parasphaerocera =

Scientific classification
- Kingdom: Animalia
- Phylum: Arthropoda
- Class: Insecta
- Order: Diptera
- Family: Sphaeroceridae
- Subfamily: Sphaerocerinae
- Genus: Parasphaerocera; Spuler, 1924

Type species
- Sphaerocera bimaculata Williston, 1896

Genus of flies

Parasphaerocera is a genus of insects belonging to the family Sphaeroceridae.

== Species ==
- P. ampla Kim, 1972
- P. baloghi Papp, 1978
- P. bimaculata (Williston, 1896)
- P. chimborazo (Richards, 1965)
- P. cooki Kim, 1972
- P. costaricensis Papp, 1978
- P. curiosa Kim, 1972
- P. currani Kim, 1972
- P. dobzhanskyi Kim, 1972
- P. ecuadoria (Richards, 1965)
- P. facialis Papp, 1978
- P. flavicoxa (Malloch, 1925)
- P. guttula (Richards, 1965)
- P. insolita Kim, 1972
- P. levicastilli (Richards, 1965)
- P. megaventralis Kim, 1972
- P. monomaculata Kim, 1972
- P. nigrifemur (Malloch, 1925)
- P. pallipes (Malloch, 1914)
- P. paratransversa Papp, 1978
- P. parva Kim, 1972
- P. prosovaripes Kim, 1972
- P. sabroskyi Kim, 1972
- P. simplex Kim, 1972
- P. subdissecta Papp, 1978
- P. subguttula Papp, 1978
- P. tertia (Richards, 1965)
- P. transversa (Richards, 1965)
- P. transversalis (Richards, 1965)
- P. trapezina (Richards, 1965)
- P. varipes (Malloch, 1925)
- P. xiphosternum (Richards, 1965)
- P. zicsii Papp, 1978
