= Eriocharis =

Scientific classification
- Domain: Eukaryota
- Kingdom: Animalia
- Phylum: Arthropoda
- Class: Insecta
- Order: Coleoptera
- Suborder: Polyphaga
- Infraorder: Cucujiformia
- Family: Cerambycidae
- Tribe: Trachyderini
- Genus: Eriocharis; Aurivillius, 1912

Genus of beetles

Eriocharis is a genus of beetles in the family Cerambycidae, containing the following species:

- Eriocharis devestivus Monné & Martins, 1973
- Eriocharis lanaris (Blanchard, 1847)
- Eriocharis richardii (Dupont, 1838)
