= Neosphaerocera =

Scientific classification
- Kingdom: Animalia
- Phylum: Arthropoda
- Class: Insecta
- Order: Diptera
- Family: Sphaeroceridae
- Subfamily: Sphaerocerinae
- Genus: Neosphaerocera; Kim, 1972

Type species
- Sphaerocera flavicoxa Malloch, 1925

Genus of flies

Neosphaerocera is a genus of flies belonging to the family Sphaeroceridae.

== Species ==
- Neosphaerocera boraceiensis Mourgues-Schurter, 1981
- Neosphaerocera breviradiata (Papp, 1978)
- Neosphaerocera flavicoxa (Malloch, 1925)
- Neosphaerocera diadelpha Mourgues-Schurter, 1981
- Neosphaerocera novaeteutoniae Mourgues-Schurter, 1981
- Neosphaerocera paraflavicoxa (Papp, 1978)
- Neosphaerocera parvula (Papp, 1978)
- Neosphaerocera richardsi (Kim, 1968)
- Neosphaerocera similis (Kim, 1972)
