= Lago di Fimon =

Lake in Veneto, Italy

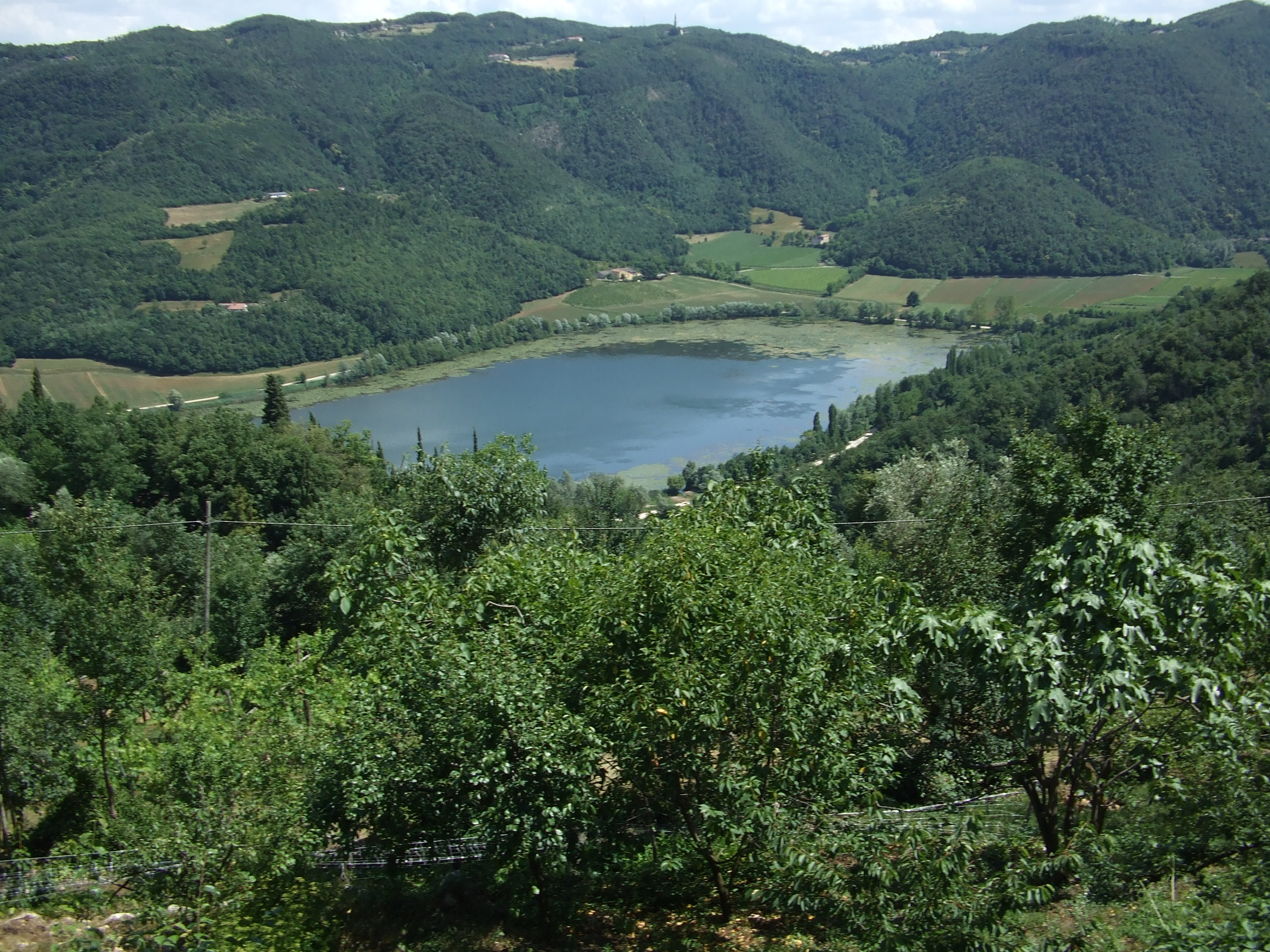

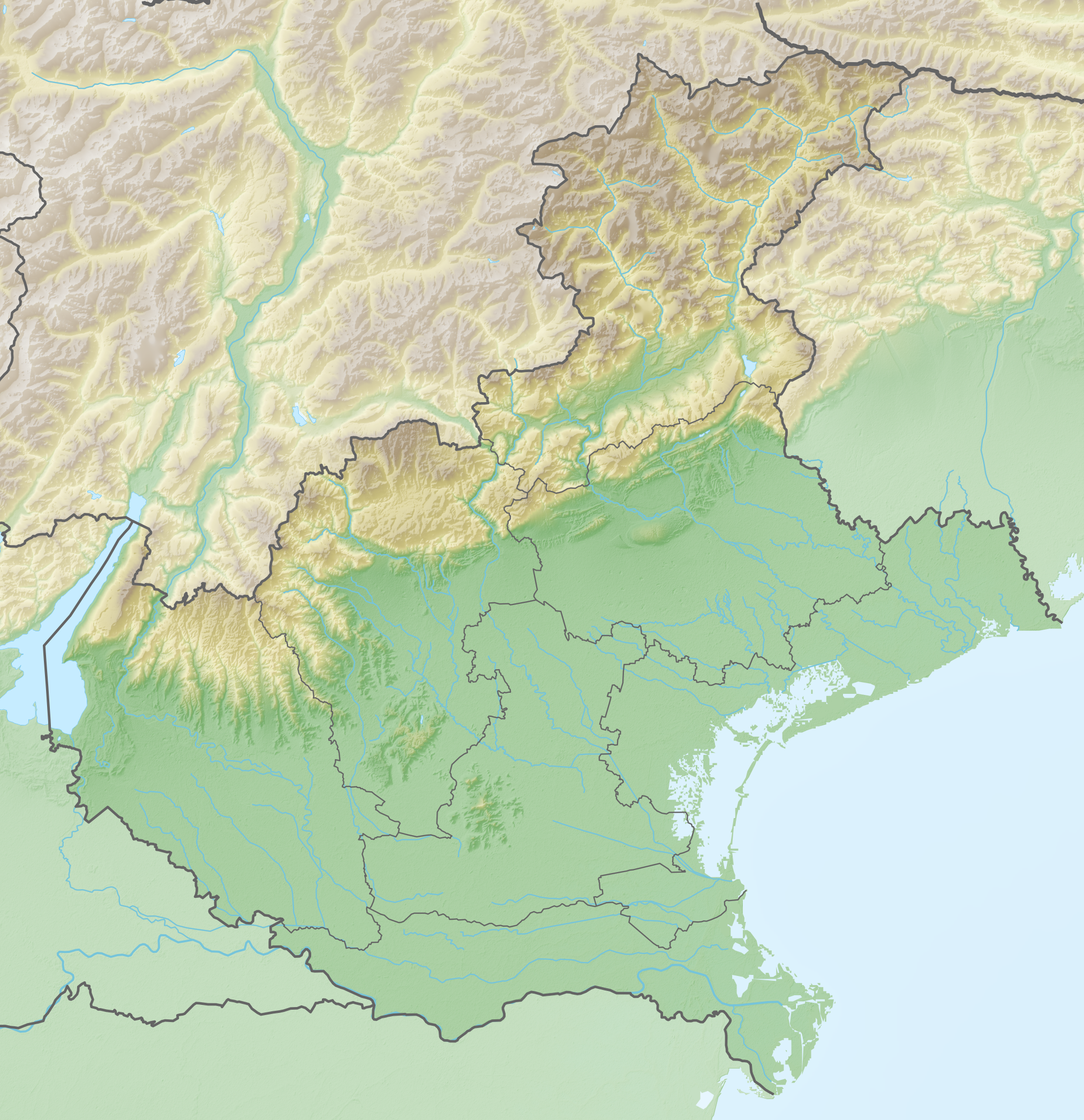
- Location within Veneto
- Location: Province of Vicenza, Veneto
- Coordinates: 45°28′10″N 11°32′34″E
- Basin countries: Italy
- Surface area: 0.51 km^{2} (0.20 sq mi)

Lago di Fimon is a lake in the Province of Vicenza, Veneto, Italy. Its surface area is 0.51 km^{2}. It is largely theorized to have glacial origins.
