= Paolo Lioy =

Italian naturalist and politician

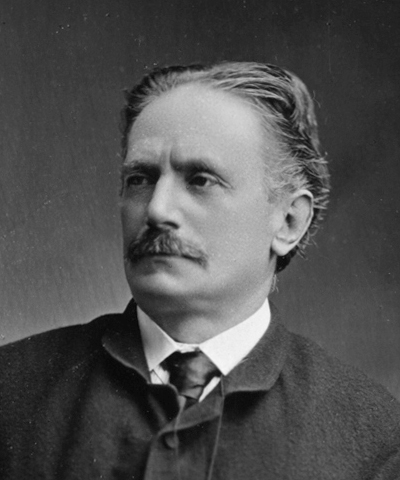
- Born: 31 July 1834; Vicenza, Italy
- Died: 27 January 1911 (aged 76); Vancimuglio di Grumolo delle Abbadesse, Italy
- Occupations: Naturalist, politician
- Known for: Popular science books, archaeological discoveries
- Notable work: La vita nell'universo, Le abitazioni lacustri di Fimon
- Spouse: Giulia de Beaumont

Paolo Lioy (31 July 1834, Vicenza – 27 January 1911, Vancimuglio di Grumolo delle Abbadesse) was an Italian naturalist, redshirt patriot and politician.

== Career ==
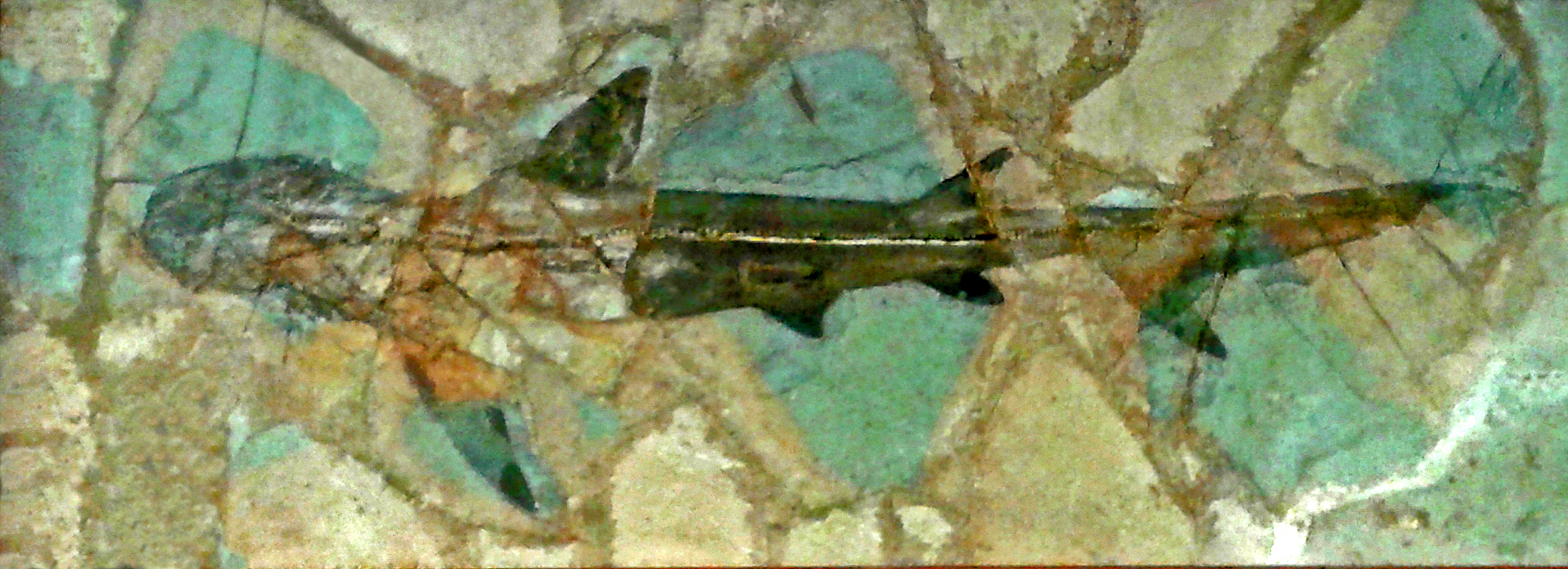
Alopiopsis a genus of Eocene fish named by Paolo Lioy in 1865

After graduating from high school, Lioy studied law in Padua. In 1853 he demonstrated his childhood interest in the natural sciences, by taking part in the reorganization of collections of the natural history section of Museo naturalistico archeologico in Vicenza

At this time he was also engaged in writing articles and political activism in favor of the unification of Italy.

In 1857, he married the daughter of an officer of Bourbon, Giulia de Beaumont.

In 1859 he published La vita nell'universo (Life in the universe), the first of his several popular science books and translated into French.

From 1862 to 1869 he served as Secretary of the Accademia Olimpica di Vicenza.

In 1864 he began excavations in the valleys around Arcugnano, looking for remains of prehistoric settlements, thus giving rise to a series of archaeological finds that continued in the next century, well after his death. Based on data collected in 1876 he published the book Le abitazioni lacustri di Fimon ( Fimon Lake dwellings), which had once again international resonance.

From 1865 he also studied fossils from Monte Bolca.

In 1866 because his involvement with Garibaldi the Austrian authorities forced him to leave. He moved to Milan along with other political refugees. His exile lasted a few months, after which he returned to Vicenza where he was appointed Provveditorato agli studi and became a Deputy, although again only for a few months.

He served as councillor from 1866 to 1902 and from 1867 to 1905 provincial Councillor. From 1870 he was elected to 6 consecutive legislatures, until 1888.

In 1905 he was appointed senatore del Regno (Senator of the Kingdom).

His scientific and literary activity continued despite political commitments, throughout his life, which ended in 1911.

For his calling for a general audience and literary abilities, Paolo Lioy was nicknamed by his contemporaries "il poeta della natura" (the poet of nature).

== Honours ==
- Order of the Crown of Italy

== Works ==
=== Books ===
- Lo studio della storia naturale (1857)
- La vita nell'universo (1859)
- Escursione nel cielo (1864)
- Escursione sotterra (1868)
- Spiritismo e magnetismo (1869)
- Chi dura vince – racconto (1871)
- Conferenze scientifiche (1872)
- Elettori e deputati (1874)
- Le abitazioni lacustri di Fimon (1876)
- Quattro novelle (1876)
- In montagna (1880, ed. Zanichelli)
- Il primo passo nella colpa, (1882), che è un'autobiografia
- Altri tempi (1883)
- Notte (1883)
- Sui laghi (1883)
- Nell'ombra (1883)
- I bacilli del colera (1884)
- In alto (1889)
- Alpinismo (1890)
- Spiriti del pensiero (1892)
- Ditteri italiani (1895)
- Piccolo mondo ignoto (1900)
- Storia naturale in campagna (1901)
- Rimembranze giovanili (1904)
- Linneo, Darwin, Agassiz: nella Vita Intima (1904)
- Il libro della notte (1905)
- Apparizioni e ricordi (1908)

=== Papers ===
- Sopra una straordinaria invasione di ditteri della famiglia degli Empiti (Prima parte) Atti della Società italiana di Scienze Naturali 1864 Vol. 6 Fasc. 3 p. 380
- Sopra una straordinaria invasione di ditteri della famiglia degli Empiti (Continuazione e fine) Atti della Società italiana di Scienze Naturali 1864 Vol. 6 Fasc. 4p.385
- Sopra una malattia che attacca la mosca domestica e sulla causa che la produce Atti della Società italiana di Scienze Naturali 1864 Vol. 6 Fasc. 4 p. 397
- Sulle cause di una invasione di Ditteri della famiglia degli Empiti e sulla convenienza di avere presenti nello studio delle vicende paleontologiche i fenomeni somiglianti che accadono nel mondo organico contemporaneo Atti della Società italiana di Scienze Naturali 1864 Vol.7 Fasc.1 p. 90
- Di una stazione lacustre scoperta nel lago di Fimon Atti della Società italiana di Scienze Naturali 1864 Vol. 7 Fasc. 1 p. 167
- Sopra alcuni vertebrati fossili del Vicentino Atti della Società italiana di Scienze Naturali 1865 Vol. 8 Fasc. 4 p. 391
- Cenni sopra uno scheletro completo di coccodrillo fossile scoperto in Monte Purga di Bolca (Crocodilus Vicetinus, Lioy)Atti della Società italiana di Scienze Naturali 1865 Vol. 8 Fasc. 4 p. 393
- Sopra alcuni avanzi di Plagiostomi fossili del Vicentino e specialmente sull'Alopiopsis Plejodon, Lioy (Galeus Cuvieri, Ag.) (Tav. IV)Atti della Società italiana di Scienze Naturali 1865 Vol. 8 Fasc. 4 p 398
- Cenni sulle marne fossilifere di Chiavon nel Vicentino Atti della Società italiana di Scienze Naturali 1865 Vol. 8 Fasc. 4 p. 406
- Sulle Clupee fossili di Bolca 1865 Atti della Società italiana di Scienze Naturali Vol. 8 Fasc. 4 p. 410
- Sopra un dente di rinoceronte fossile trovato nell'arenaria grigia di Bolzano nel Bellunese Atti della Società italiana di Scienze Naturali 1865 Vol. 8 Fasc. 4 p. 415
- La stazione lacustre di Fimon Atti della Società italiana di Scienze Naturali 1865 Vol. 8 Fasc.4 p. 418
- Sulle condizioni fisiche ed economiche del Vicentino. Discorso d'apertura della Riunione 1Atti della Società italiana di Scienze Naturali 868 Vol. 11 Fasc. 3 p. 425
- I Coccodrilli fossili del Veneto. Atti del Reale Istituto Veneto Scienze Lettere ed Arti 1896, serie 7, 54: 753–783.
