= Hackman =

A hackman is a term for a coachman.

Hackman may also refer to:

- Hackman (company), a cutlery firm founded in Finland in 1790
- Hackman (surname), includes a list of people with the surname
- Hackman's Gate, hamlet in Worcestershire, England
- Samuel E. Hackman Building, historic building in Hartsburg, Missouri
