= Uganda National Council for Science and Technology =

Government agency established in 1990

Agency overview
- Formed: 1990; 36 years ago
- Jurisdiction: Government of Uganda
- Headquarters: Kampala, Uganda
- Parent agency: Ministry of Science, Technology and Innovation, Government of Uganda
- Website: https://www.uncst.go.ug/

Uganda National Council for Science and Technology (UNCST) is a partly independent government agency established in 1990 under the Uganda National Council for Science and Technology Act (Cap. 209). It is mandated to advise the Government of Uganda, develop and implement policies for science, technology and research, and coordinate national research and development activities to support Uganda’s socio-economic transformation.

== Location ==
Uganda National Council for Science and Technology is located at Plot 6, Kimera Road, Ntinda, Kampala, Uganda, with a postal address of P.O. Box 6884, Kampala.

== History ==
The Uganda National Council for Science and Technology (UNCST) was established in 1990 by an Act of Parliament (Cap 209 of the Laws of Uganda) as a partly independent government agency responsible for guiding and coordinating science, technology, and research development in Uganda.

At its formation, UNCST was placed under the government ministry responsible for science and technology (now the Ministry of Science, Technology and Innovation under the Office of the President), which provides its policy guidance and oversight.

== Administration ==
NCST operates under the Ministry of Science, Technology and Innovation in the Office of the President, and it is governed by a governing council, which provides strategic direction, policy oversight, and governance leadership.

The Uganda National Council for Science and Technology has had the following Governing Council Chairpersons: the 1st Governing Council was chaired by Prof. Herbert S. Kanabi Nsubuga (RIP), followed by Prof. John P. M. L. Ssebuwufu, who served as Chairperson for both the 2nd and 3rd Councils. The 4th Governing Council was chaired by Dr Theresa Sengooba from 2016 to July 2023, and in August 2024, Prof. Rhoda Wanyenze was appointed as the 5th Governing Council chairperson, with Prof. John Muyonga serving as Vice Chairperson.

== See also ==
- Ministry of Science, Technology and Innovation
- Office of the President
- Rhoda Wanyenze
