= Minister of Science, Technology and Innovation =

Minister of Science, Technology and Innovation may refer to:

- Minister of Science, Technology and Innovation (Argentina)
- Minister of Science, Technology and Innovation (Brazil)
- Minister of Science, Technology and Innovation (Colombia)
- Minister of Science, Technology and Innovation (Malaysia)
- Minister of Science, Technology and Innovation (South Africa)
- Minister of Science, Technology and Innovation (Uganda)

== See also ==
- Federal Ministry of Innovation, Science and Technology (Nigeria)
- Secretary of State for Science, Innovation and Technology (United Kingdom)
- Category:Science and technology ministries
