= Judith Waudo =

Judith Ndombi Waudo (born 27 May 1958) is a Kenyan scholar and professor of nutrition. She is the director for the Office of Gender Equality and Empowerment at Kenyatta University. She is the head of the university’s Centre for Women’s Economic Empowerment, as well as a full professor in the Department of Food, Nutrition and Dietetics. She leads a Bill & Melinda Gates Foundation–funded project on women’s economic empowerment in Kenya. She has contributed to the development of United Nations economic empowerment tools. Waudo was a reviewer of Kenya’s national policies on women’s economic empowerment. At the university, she chairs the University Rankings Committee and is a member of the University Scholarships Committee. She also serves as an expert panelist at the International Science Council to promote gender equality in scientific organizations.

== Education ==
Waudo earned a Doctor of Philosophy in Nutrition Education from the University of Alberta, Edmonton, Canada (1989–1993). She holds a Master of Science in Nutrition Education from Iowa State University, United States (1982–1984), and a Bachelor of Science in Foods and Nutrition from Central University College in Iowa, United States (1978–1982).

== Career ==
Waudo is a full professor in the Department of Food, Nutrition and Dietetics at Kenyatta University, with more than 38 years of teaching and research experience. She has written about 30 scholarly publications on nutrition, health, education, and gender.

She leads the Bill & Melinda Gates Foundation–funded project 'What Works to Improve Women’s Economic Empowerment in Kenya'. She has contributed to developing United Nations economic empowerment tools for women. Waudo has participated in the review of Kenya’s national policies on women’s economic empowerment and has conducted research on sexual harassment. The Center for Gender Equality and Empowerment, directed by Waudo, developed a digital app for anonymous filing and reporting of sexual gender-based violence for staff and students at Kenyatta University.

In addition to her academic work, she chairs the Technical Committee of the African Centre for Transformative and Inclusive Leadership at Kenyatta University. She is chair of the University Rankings Committee and a member of the University Scholarships Committee. Waudo serves as an expert panelist on gender equality in scientific organizations for the International Science Council.
