= Antrops =

Scientific classification
- Kingdom: Animalia
- Phylum: Arthropoda
- Clade: Pancrustacea
- Class: Insecta
- Order: Diptera
- Family: Sphaeroceridae
- Subfamily: Copromyzinae
- Genus: Antrops; Enderlein, 1909

Type species
- Antrops truncipennis Enderlein, 1909

Synonyms
- Anthrops Hackman, 1969

Genus of flies

Antrops is a genus of flies belonging to the family Sphaeroceridae from Chile (Magallanes, Cape Horn), Falkland Islands & South Georgia Island.

== Species ==
- Antrops truncipennis Enderlein, 1909
