= Phạm Quốc Anh =

Vietnamese politician

Deputy, National Assembly (Vietnam)
- In office 2007–2011

Personal details
- Born: 11 April 1940 (age 86) Binh Minh Commune, Khoái Châu District, Hung Yen Province, Vietnam
- Occupation: Lawyer, politician
- Known for: President of the Vietnam Lawyers Association

Phạm Quốc Anh (born 11 April 1940) is a Vietnamese lawyer and former deputy of the Vietnamese National Assembly.

== Biography ==
Phạm Quốc Anh was born on 11 April 1940 in Binh Minh Commune, Khoái Châu District, Hung Yen Province, Vietnam. He belongs to the Vietnamese ethnic group. He joined the Communist party on 26 November 1961. He qualified as a Chemical engineer and Bachelor of Laws. Quốc Anh became President of the Vietnam Lawyers Association and Vice President of the Vietnam Union of Science and Technology Associations. He was a member of the Central Presidium of the Vietnamese Fatherland Front from 2004 to 2009.

He was a deputy in the XII National Assembly (2007–2011) and was a member of the Law Committee of the National Assembly. In his 2007 election manifesto he promised to make a positive contribution to the development of laws and monitoring the implementation of laws of the National Assembly. He would step up the activities of the Lawyers' Association in law propaganda and education to raise the people's awareness in the fight against criminal offenses, drugs and prostitution, economic crimes, violations of traffic safety laws and violations of State regulations. In November 2010 he spoke in the Assembly in favor of the independent audit plan, and of regulation of the professional association of auditors. The tasks for this association should be defined by the state, and the Ministry of Finance should be responsible for training and certifying auditors.

As of 2020 Quốc Anh worked for the Vietnam Lawyers Association in Hanoi. In 2020 the website of the International Council of Jurists showed Phạm Quốc Anh as one of the honorary secretaries of that organization.
