= Pius Bigirimana =

Ugandan author, retired civil servant and public administrator

Pius Bigirimana OSN
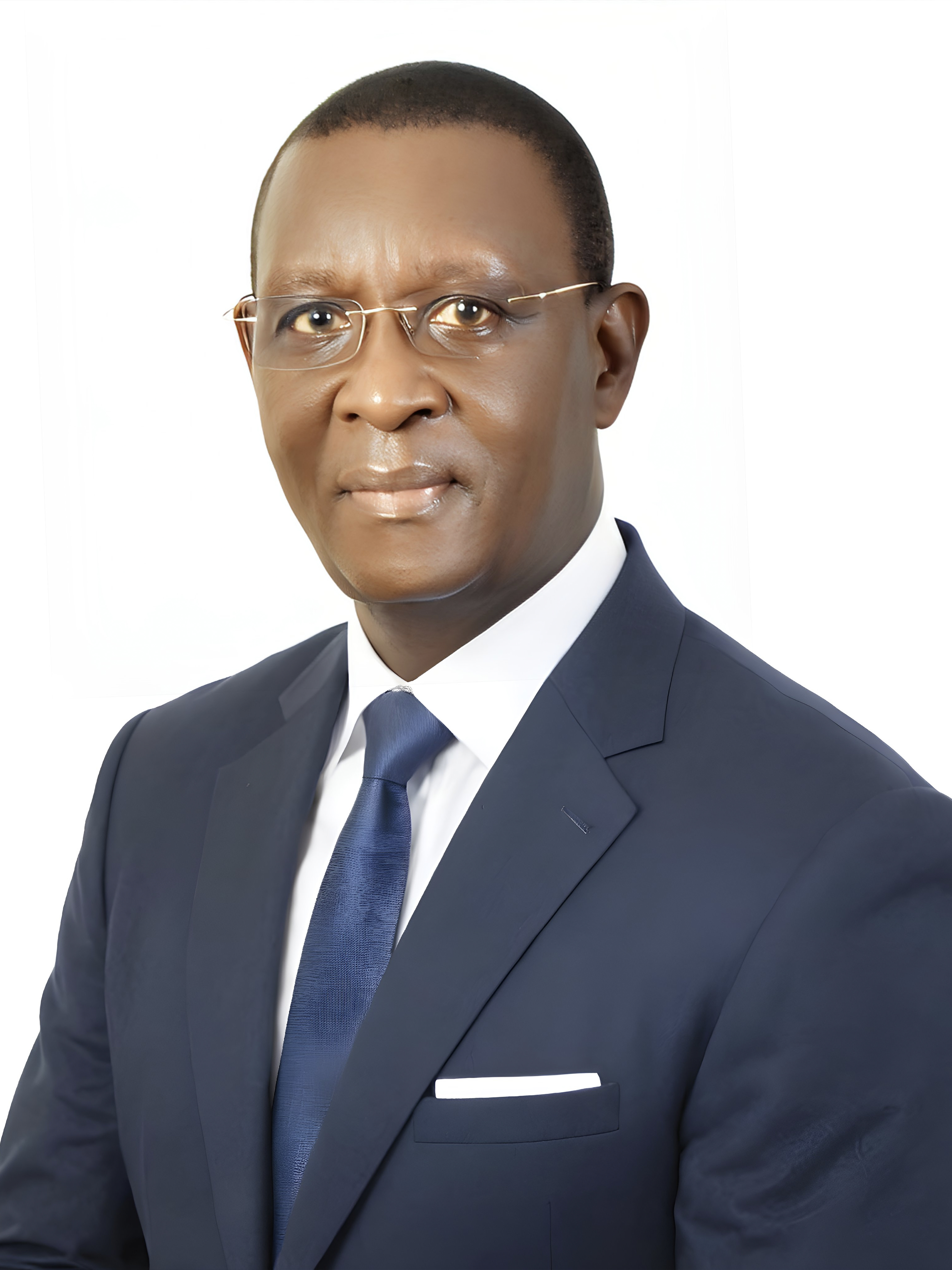

Permanent Secretary and Secretary to the Judiciary
- In office July 2019 – November 2026
- Appointed by: Yoweri Museveni
- Preceded by: Expedito Kagole Kivumbi
- Succeeded by: Doreen Silver Katusiime

Permanent Secretary – Ministry of Gender, Labour and Social Development
- In office 2013 – July 2019
- Appointed by: Yoweri Museveni
- Preceded by: Guwatudde Kintu Christine
- Succeeded by: James Ebitu

Board Member – International Labour Organization
- In office 2017–2019

Permanent Secretary – Office of the Prime Minister
- In office October 2008 – 2013
- Appointed by: Yoweri Museveni
- Preceded by: Edith Mwanje
- Succeeded by: Guwatudde Kintu Christine

Under Secretary – Ministry of Health
- In office 2006–2008

Under Secretary – Ministry of Public Service
- In office 2005–2006

Under Secretary – Ministry of Education and Sports
- In office 1999–2005

Principal Assistant Secretary – Office of the President
- In office 1993–1999

Assistant secretary – Office of the President
- In office 1988–1993

Senior Assistant Secretary – Ministry of Local Government
- In office Jun.1988–Nov.1988

Assistant Secretary – Ministry of Justice and Attorney General
- In office 1986–1987

Assistant District Commissioner Mbale
- In office 1984–1986

Assistant District Commissioner Kisoro
- In office 1983–1984

Personal details
- Born: 22 March 1958 (age 68) Kisoro District, Uganda
- Citizenship: Ugandan
- Spouse: Elizabeth Bigirimana
- Education: Bachelor’s degree in Political Science and Public Administration from Makerere University; Master of Arts in Development Administration from University of Manchester; Master of Business Administration from Eastern and Southern African Management Institute
- Occupation: Civil servant, public administrator, author
- Known for: Public Service leadership; Permanent Secretary
- Awards: Distinguished Order of the Source of Nile
- Website: Homepage

Pius Bigirimana (born 22 March 1958) is a retired Ugandan civil servant and public administratorwho served as the Permanent Secretary and Secretary to the Judiciary of Uganda from 2019 to 2026. Before this, he served as Permanent Secretary in both the Office of the Prime Minister and the Ministry of Gender, Labour and Social Development. While serving in the Ministry of Gender, Labour and Social Development, he joined social medica to interest youths in government programmes

His career began in the 1980s as an Assistant District Commissioner. Over the decades, he held several senior administrative roles within the Office of the President and various other ministries, eventually becoming Permanent Secretary in 2008.

His work has included roles in public administration and government programme implementation.

In May 2023, he was elected Vice President of the Uganda Association of Public Administration and Management, which is linked to the African Association for Public Administration and Management.

He is married to Elizabeth Bigirimana. In 2023, they marked their 25th wedding anniversary.

== Early life and education ==
=== Early life ===
Pius Bigirimana was born and raised in Uganda’s Kisoro District, to the late Peter Kalerangabo, during the post-independence period in Uganda. He was the seventh of ten children. His father was known locally for supporting formal education among his children.

==== Education ====
He started school at Gatete Primary School in Kisoro before moving to Mutolere Primary School where he completed his primary education and completed his secondary studies at St. Mary’s College, Rushoroza.

Bigirimana was admitted to Makerere University from where he graduated with a Bachelor of Arts in Political Science and Public Administration degree in 1983. He later obtained a Postgraduate Diploma in Development Administration in 1988 and Master of Arts in Development Administration in 1991 from the University of Manchester. In 2010, Bigirimana completed a Master of Business Administration (MBA) from the Eastern and Southern African Management Institute in Arusha, Tanzania.

== Career ==
=== Early public service ===
Pius Bigirimana’s career began in the Kisoro District as an Assistant District Commissioner. By 1984, he had transitioned to Mbale District in the same capacity. His roles also included serving as an Assistant Secretary and Personal Assistant to the Minister of Justice and Attorney General.

He took on the role of Senior Assistant Secretary in the Ministry of Local Government followed by a post as Principal Assistant Secretary in the Office of the President. His experience as an Under Secretary is diverse, having served across the Ministries of Education and Sports, Defence, Public Service, and Health.

=== Permanent Secretary appointments ===
==== Office of the Prime Minister (2008–2013) ====
In October 2008, Bigirimana was appointed Permanent Secretary for the Office of the Prime Minister (OPM). For five years, he acted as the chief administrative and accounting officer, overseeing the coordination of various government programs.

He helped implement the Peace, Recovery, and Development Plan and the Northern Uganda Social Action Fund, both aimed at rebuilding communities after conflict.

He was associated with conceptualization and development of the Uganda Annual Government Performance Review.

Between 2006 and 2007, he worked on restructuring how Global Fund and GAVI finances were managed to improve transparency following previous funding issues in the health sector.

While his time at the OPM involved public scrutiny regarding donor funds for Northern Uganda, Bigirimana sought to clear his name through the legal system. In 2021, the High Court ruled in his favor in a defamation case related to those reports.

===== Ministry of Gender, Labour and Social Development (2013–2019) =====
Following his tenure at the OPM, Bigirimana spent six years as Permanent Secretary in the Ministry of Gender, Labour and Social Development. He is associated with creating and launching the Youth Livelihood Programme, the Uganda Women Entrepreneurship Programme, and the Green Jobs Programme.

===== Judiciary of Uganda (2019–present) =====
In July 2019, Bigirimana was appointed Permanent Secretary and Secretary to the Judiciary of Uganda. In this role, he manages the administrative functions of the courts, including budgets, personnel, procurement, and planning.

During his tenure, the Judiciary has introduced Electronic Court Case Management Information System, which allows for digital filing and case tracking, constructed court buildings, including new homes for the Supreme Court and Court of Appeal, as well as upgrading local Magistrates' Courts, and expanded the use of video conferencing tools to connect courts with prisons, allowing for more efficient remote proceedings.

On November 9, 2026, he was retired from his position following a major civil service reshuffle and restructuring of permanent secretaries announced by President Yoweri Museveni. He was succeeded as the Permanent Secretary and Secretary to the Judiciary by Doreen Silver Katusiime, who was redeployed from the Ministry of Tourism, Wildlife and Antiquities.

Office	Position	Term start	Term end
Office of the Prime Minister (Uganda)	Permanent Secretary	October 2008	2013
Ministry of Gender, Labour and Social Development (Uganda)	Permanent Secretary	2013	July 2019
Judiciary of Uganda	Permanent Secretary and Secretary to the Judiciary	July 2019	November 2026

== Regional and professional roles ==
Beyond his national duties, Bigirimana has represented Uganda in regional judicial administration bodies across Southern and Eastern Africa. In these roles, he participated in regional forums on court administration and cooperation among member states.

== Literary work ==
Bigirimana has written on governance, leadership, and social integrity. Some of his published titles include: From Tears to Cheers, Youth Livelihood, Corruption: A Tale of Wolves in Sheep’s Clothing, Unchained: A Public Servant with a Private Sector Mindset, A small book with big quotes, Abundance Mentality, and Naked Truth.

== Legal proceedings ==
In 2021, the High Court of Uganda ruled in Bigirimana's favor regarding a defamation lawsuit against Monitor Publications Limited. The court awarded him damages and issued a permanent injunction to prevent the publication of further defamatory material against him.

== Anti-corruption activities and controversies ==
During his tenure at the Office of the Prime Minister, Bigirimana, according to media reports, raised concerns about financial irregularities in the Office of the Prime Minister’s accounting systems through internal memoranda, which were later examined during investigations into the OPM funds scandal. Several media reports described his role in reporting these issues as that of a whistleblower within government.

In 2014, Bigirimana published Corruption: A Tale of Wolves in Sheep’s Clothing, a book addressing issues of governance, accountability, and the management of public resources. He later published Unchained: A Public Servant with a Private Sector Mindset, which also discusses public administration and institutional reform.

While serving as Permanent Secretary to the Judiciary, Bigirimana reported suspected irregular payments for investigation. Public statements during this period referenced financial discipline, procurement compliance, and administrative accountability within the institution.

== Community involvement ==
According to Nile Post and ChimpReports, Bigirimana has supported various community-driven projects in Kisoro District where he has been particularly active in local health initiatives, including efforts to develop and improve regional health facilities.

== Awards and honours ==
In December 2021, Bigirimana was awarded an Honorary Doctorate in Leadership and Management. This honour was conferred by the Geofidel Institute of Leadership and Management (United Kingdom) in collaboration with Stratford University (United States) to recognize his leadership and service.

He is also a recipient of the Distinguished Order of the Source of the Nile (Class One), one of Uganda’s highest national honours for outstanding service to the state. He was formally decorated with this award during the 2023 Labour Day celebrations.
