= Vehicle registration plates of Uganda =

Uganda
- Country: Uganda
- Country code: EAU
- Colour (front): Black on white
- Colour (rear): Black on white

Uganda requires its residents to register their motor vehicles and display vehicle registration plates. A serial letter is shown in the right part of the plate.

Old Uganda Government vehicles are written with red paint on a yellow/orange or white background. They all start with UG, followed by a number then a letter code to identify the ministry, department, or agency.

Image	First issued	Design	Slogan	Serial format	Serials issued	Notes
	1990					
						Police

Government vehicle are identified with the following codes:

- A- Ministry of Agriculture, Animal Industry and Fisheries
- B- Electoral Commission & Human Rights Commission
- C- Office of the President / State House of Uganda
- D- Ministry of Defence and Veteran Affairs
- E- Ministry of Education and Sports
- F- Ministry of Finance, Planning and Economic Development
- G-Ministry of Internal Affairs
- H- Parliament of Uganda/ Office of the Auditor General
- I- Ministry of Ministry of East African Community Affairs
- J- Ministry of Judiciary and Constitutional Affairs
- K- Ministry of Energy and Mineral Development
- L- Ministry of Lands, Housing and Urban Development
- M- Ministry of Health
- N- Ministry of Information and Communications Technology
- O- Ministry of Science, Technology and Innovation
- Q- Ministry of Public Service
- R- Ministry of Local Government
- S- Ministry of Water and Environment
- T- Uganda Ministry of Tourism, Wildlife and Antiquities
- U- Uganda Prisons Service
- W- Ministry of Works and Transport
- X- Ministry of Foreign Affairs
- Y- Ministry of Gender, Labour and Social Development
- Z- Office of the Prime Minister

Previously, Uganda had three agencies responsible for handling issues of license plates and these were; Uganda Revenue Authority (URA), Chief Mechanical Engineer (CME) and the Military Licensing Board (MLB). However, with effect from 1 July 2023 all vehicle registration functions were fully handed over to the Ministry of Works and Transport (MoWT) from Uganda Revenue Authority a move that had been in the pipeline for three years.

== Transition to Digital number plates ==
Uganda faced security challenges such as the several high-profile murders like that of Major Mohammed Kiggundu in November 2016, the Uganda Police spokesperson AIGP Felix Kaweesi in March 2017, Arua Municipality legislator Hon. Ibrahim Abiriga in June 2018, and that of former Buyende district Police Commander Muhamad Kirumira in September 2018 and the failed assassination of former army commander Gen. Katumba Wamala that claimed the life of his daughter in June 2021. All these murders seemed to have one common characteristic which was assailants following victims in their cars, shooting them and the move away with help of boda boda (motor bikes). This led to the birth of ideas of such as installing surveillance cameras in major towns and highways and also the use of digital number plates on all motor vehicles to ease tracking of criminals that had made it a habit to use vehicles to flee scenes of crime and ultimately combat crime.The ideas were majorly fronted by the President of Uganda Rtd. Gen. Yoweri Museveni who even re-echoed the same in his 2021 state of the nation address.

Government of Uganda in 2021 signed an agreement with a Russian firm Joint Stock Global Security Company to deliver the Intelligent Transport Monitoring System (ITMS) to be used in the tracking of motor vehicles in Uganda However the process that led to contracting the company was contested and even probed by the parliamentary committee on physical infrastructure and later to a classified Committee of the House However the probe and findings did not hinder government from continuing with the plan and the digital number plates drive was successfully launched in November 2023 by Security Minister Rtd Maj. Gen. Jim Muhwezi and his Works and Transport counterpart Gen. Edward Katumba Wamala starting with the installations of the technology enhanced plates on government owned vehicles.

Below is a description of the new codes on the digital registration plates for government ministries, departments and agencies vehicles according to the traffic and road safety (Registration plates) (amendment) (No.3) Regulations, 2024;

Digital Registration Plates
Code	Government agency
UG 01 00001	OFFICE OF THE PRESIDENT
UG 02 00001	EDUCATION SERVICE COMMISSION
UG 03 00001	ELECTORAL COMMISSION
UG 04 00001	EQUAL OPPORTUNITIES COMMISSION
UG 05 00001	HEALTH SERVICES COMMISSION
UG 06 00001	JUDICIAL SERVICES COMMISSION
UG 07 00001	LOCAL GOVERNMENT COMMISSION
UG 08 00001	PUBLIC SERVICE COMMISSION
UG 09 00001	UGANDA HUMAN RIGHTS COMMISSION
UG 10 00001	UGANDA LAND COMMISSION
UG 11 00001	UGANDA LAW REFORM COMMISSION
UG 12 00001	MINISTRY OF AGRICULTURE ANIMAL INDUSTRY AND FISHERIES
UG 16 00001	INSPECTORATE OF GOVERNMENT
UG 18 00001	MINISTRY OF DEFENCE AND VETERAN AFFAIRS
UG 19 00001	MINISTRY OF EDUCATION AND SPORTS
UG 20 00001	MINISTRY OF FINANCE PLANNING AND ECONOMIC DEVELOPMENT
UG 21 00001	MINISTRY OF INTERNAL AFFAIRS
UG 22 00001	CLERK TO PARLIAMENT
UG 23 00001	AUDITOR GENERAL
UG 24 00001	MINISTRY OF JUSTICE AND CONSTITUTIONAL AFFAIRS
UG 25 00001	COURTS OF JUDICATURE
UG 26 00001	DIRECTORATE OF PUBLIC PROSECUTIONS
UG 27 00001	LAW DEVELOPMENT CENTER
UG 29 00001	MINISTRY OF ENERGY AND MINERAL DEVELOPMENT
UG 30 00001	MINISTRY OF LANDS, HOUSING AND URBAN DEVELOPMENT
UG 31 00001	MINISTRY OF HEALTH
UG 32 00001	MINISTRY OF INFORMATION, COMMUNICATION AND NATIONAL GUIDANCE
UG 33 00001	MINISTRY OF PUBLIC SERVICE
UG 34 00001	MINISTRY OF LOCAL GOVERNMENT
UG 35 00001	MINISTRY OF WATER AND ENVIRONMENT
UG 36 00001	MINISTRY OF TOURISM, WILDLIFE AND ANTIQUITIES
UG 37 00001	MINISTRY OF TRADE, INDUSTRIES AND CO-OPERATIVES
UG 38 00001	MINISTRY OF WORKS AND TRANSPORT
UG 39 00001	MINISTRY OF FOREIGN AFFAIRS
UG 40 00001	MINISTRY OF GENDER LABOUR AND SOCIAL DEVELOPMENT
UG 41 00001	OFFICE OF THE PRIME MINISTER
UP 00001	UGANDA POLICE FORCE
UU 00001	UGANDA PRISONS SERVICE
