= Hackmann =

Hackmann is a surname of German origin, originating as an occupational surname for a butcher or woodcutter. Notable people with the surname include:

- Barbara Ann Hackmann (1943 – c. 1967), American homicide victim
- Heide Hackmann, South African interim director and CEO
- Hermann Hackmann (1913-1994), German war criminal

== See also ==
- Hackman (surname)
