= Kiira Motors Corporation =

Ugandan state-owned automotive company

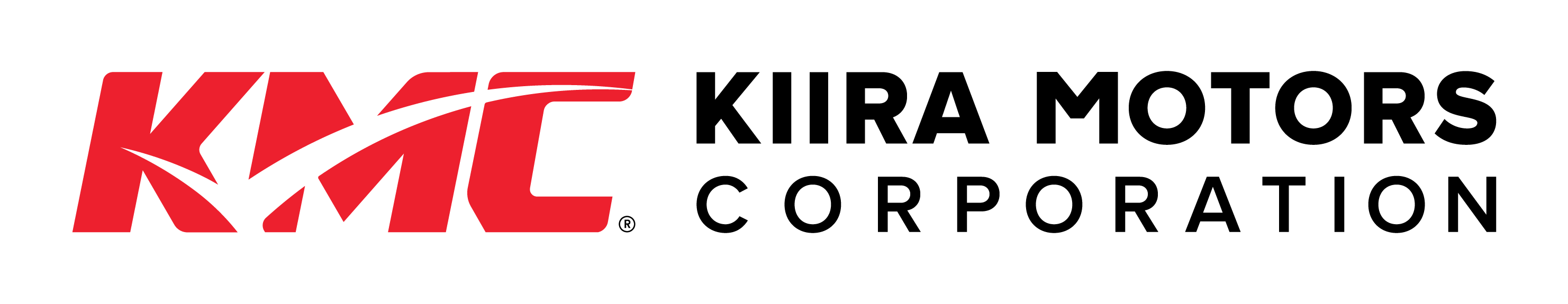
- Type: State enterprise
- Industry: Automotive
- Founded: 2014
- Headquarters: Kiira Vehicle Plant, Jinja, Uganda
- Area served: Uganda and Saudi Arabia
- Key people: Sandy Stevens Tickodri-Togboa (Executive Chairman); Paul Isaac Musasizi (Chief Executive Officer)
- Products: Automobiles
- Owner: Government of Uganda (96%); Makerere University(4%)
- Website: kiiramotors.com

Kiira Motors Corporation or KMC is a state-owned automotive manufacturer in Uganda. It was established to develop the country's automotive industry and commercialise the Kiira Electric Vehicle Project. The equity partner is the Government of the Republic of Uganda represented by the Ministry of Science, Technology and Innovation. The Office of the President holds 96 percent of the initial stock and Makerere University holds 4 percent.

Africa's first electric vehicle was developed under the Kiira Electric Vehicle Project in 2011. KMC developed Africa's first hybrid vehicle, the Kiira EVS, in 2014 and Africa's first solar electric bus, the Kayoola Solar Bus in 2016.

KMC's market entry products are the Kayoola EVS a fully electric low Floor City Bus with a range of 300 kilometers on a full charge and the Kayoola Coach, a premium highway coach available in both electric and diesel powertrains.

== History ==
The origins of Kiira Motors Corporation date to 2007, when a team at Makerere University's Faculty of Technology participated in the Vehicle Design Summit (VDS), an international project involving more than 31 universities and colleges. The project aimed to design a five-seat plug-in hybrid electric vehicle, known as the Vision 200, for the Indian market.

The three-year project was led by the Massachusetts Institute of Technology (MIT) in the United States. Makerere University was the only participating institution from Africa. Its team, based in the Faculty of Technology (now the College of Engineering, Design, Art and Technology), was responsible for designing and integrating the vehicle's low-power electronics and data networking systems.

Following its participation in the Vision 200 project, the Makerere University team began developing plans to design and build a vehicle in Uganda, drawing on the experience gained through the project and other international collaborations.

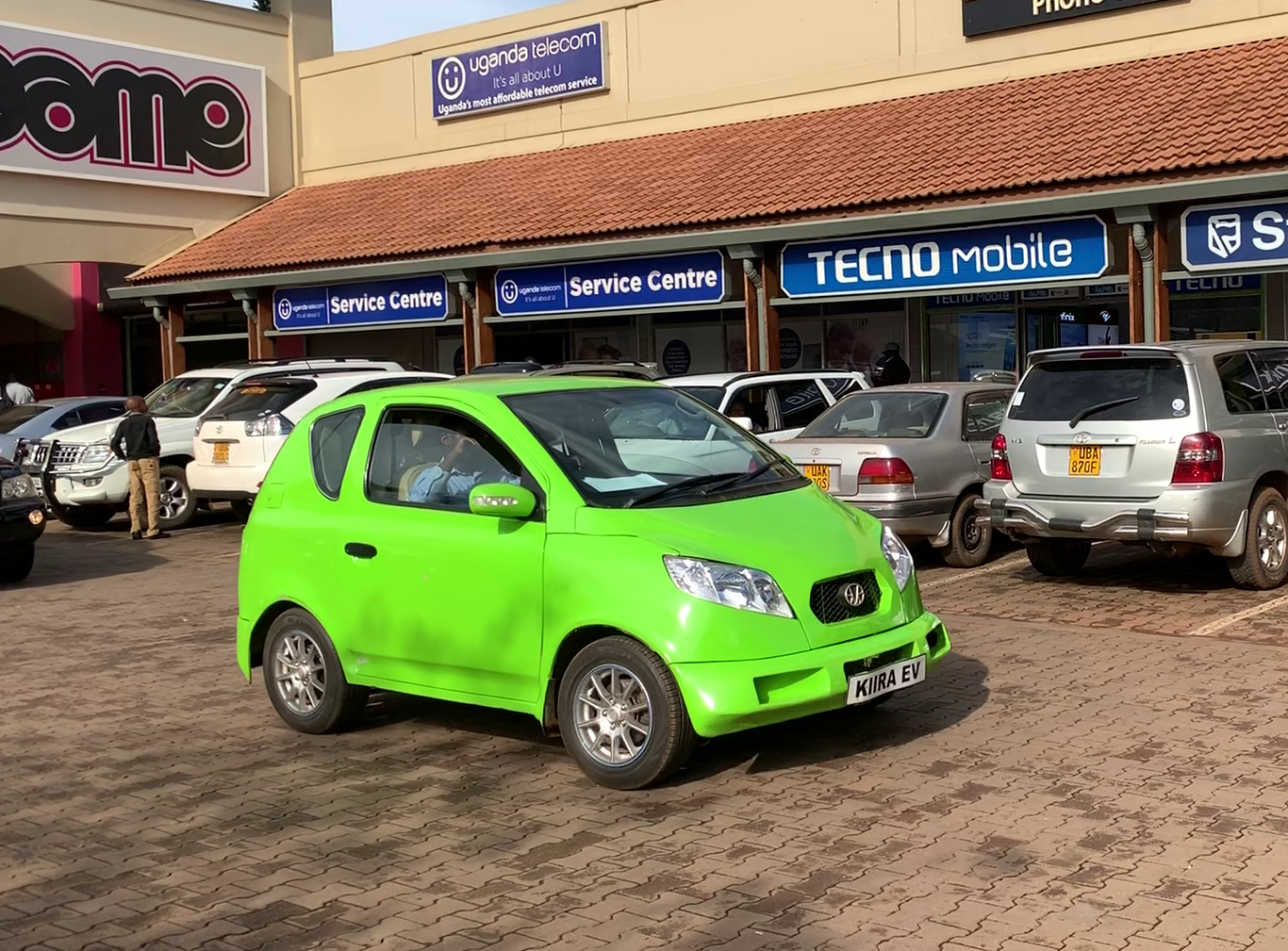
The Kiira EV in Kampala

The Center for Research in Transport Technologies (CRTT) was then conceived under Makerere University in December 2008 and approved as part of the University Structures effective 1 January 2011. The strategic goal of CRTT was to advance research and innovation in transportation technologies on land, air and sea with specific emphasis on green mobility solutions for Africa. The Kiira EV Project was the first project implemented under CRTT. The Kiira EV, Africa's first electric vehicle, was completed by the team and launched by Yoweri Museveni, the President of the Republic of Uganda, on 24 November 2011.

The successful execution of the Kiira EV Project led to the establishment of the Kiira Motors Project as a government initiative for Automotive Industry Development aimed at Establishing a Vehicle Plant in Uganda. The Kiira Motors Project started the Kiira Vehicle Technology Innovation Program through which the Kiira EV SMACK, the first Electric Hybrid Vehicle designed and built in Africa, was developed and unveiled at a very high-profile event at the Kenyatta International Convention Centre in Nairobi, Kenya in November 2014.

The team then designed and built the Kayoola Solar Bus, the first Electric Solar Bus designed and built in Africa. The Kayoola Solar Bus was launched by Yoweri Museveni on 16 February 2016 at the Kampala Serena Hotel.

Kiira Motors conducted a Pre-Investment Analysis (The KMC Business Case) to affirm the viability of vision Vehicles Made in Uganda. This informed the development of the Kiira Motors Corporation Business Strategy and subsequently Business Plan. The KMC Pre-Investment Analysis (Business Case) was launched by the Uganda Prime Minister Ruhakana Rugunda on 7 December 2015 at the President's Office Conference Hall.

== Commercial Production ==
Cabinet of Uganda sitting on Monday 9 April 2018 at Statehouse Entebbe approved the roadmap for the Commercialization of the Kiira Electric Vehicle Project. This is to be undertaken in a phased manner with the market-entry point being assembly of vehicles (including electric vehicles) in partnership with reputable vehicle manufacturers. Cabinet approved a Seed Fund of US$40 Million (USh 143.7 Billion) over a period of four years starting in the Financial Year 2018/19 with an allocation of USh 24 Billion under the Ministry of Science, Technology and Innovation. The decision was facilitated by a comprehensive appraisal and approval of a Feasibility Study for Setting Up and Operating the Kiira Vehicle Plant by the Ministry of Finance, Planning and Economic Development. Cabinet also authorised the Minister of Science, Technology and Innovation to put in place the necessary Institutional Framework for the Commercialization of the Kiira Electric Vehicle Project and mandated the Ministry of Science, Technology and Innovation to establish and oversee the project governance and management structures.

== Kiira Vehicle Plant ==
The government of Uganda, acting through the Uganda Investment Authority (UIA), allocated 100 acres for the establishment of the Kiira Vehicle Plant, located at the Jinja Industrial and Business Park, Plot No. 701, Block 2 Kagogwa Village, Mawoito Parish, Kakira Town Council, Jinja District.

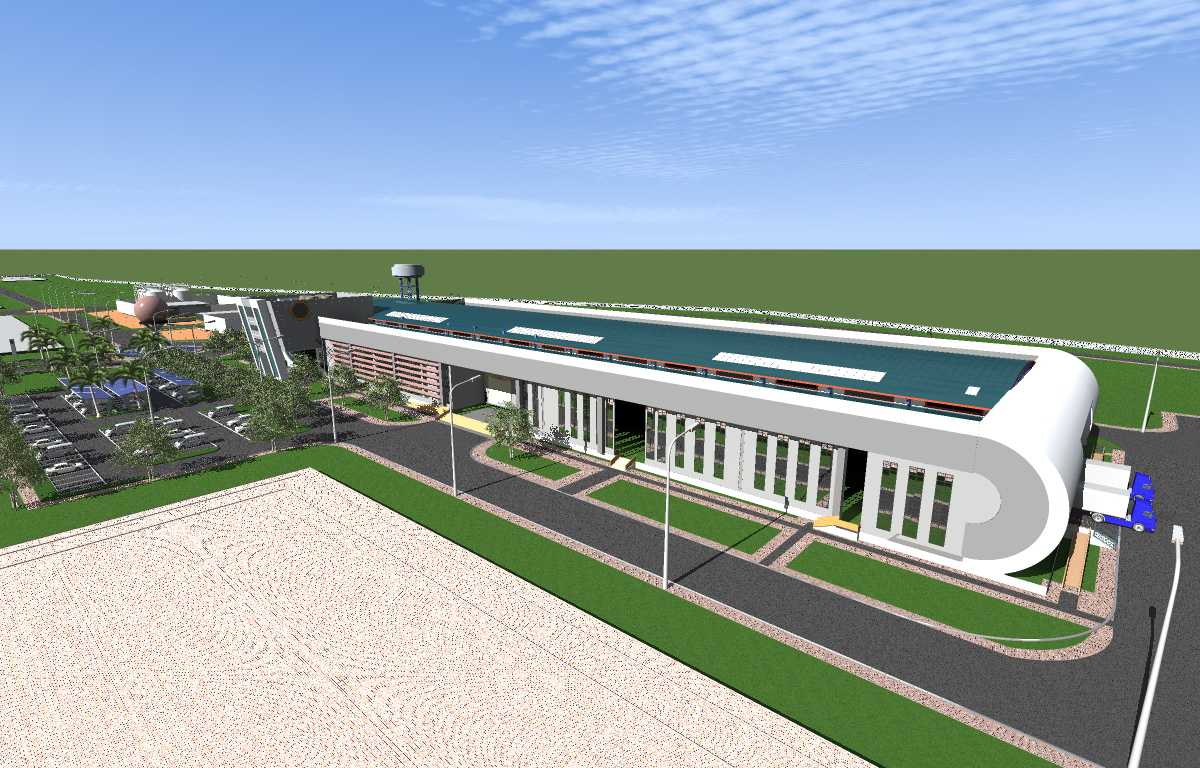
Artistic Impression of the Kiira Vehicle Plant

Kiira Motors Corporation and National Enterprise Corporation (NEC) signed a Memorandum of Understanding for Construction of the Kiira Vehicle Plant Start-Up Facilities (Phase I) at the Jinja Industrial and Business Park based on the Force Account Mechanism provided for under Section 95(A) of the PPDA Act, 2003 (as amended). This was subsequent to clearance of the MOU by the Solicitor General. The Kiira Vehicle Plant Site was handed over to NEC on 18 January 2019, who deployed security and commenced work on 11 February 2019. Construction is expected to take two and a half (2.5) Years with completion slated for June 2021.

The project included the construction of an assembly shop, office and research facilities, storage areas, vehicle parking facilities, access roads and supporting infrastructure. Other works included site clearance, perimeter fencing, drainage, water and electricity distribution, and waste management systems. The contract provided for a 12-month defects liability period following practical completion of the project.

The construction and installation of a 3.7 kilometres (2 mi) long 33kV medium voltage electricity line connecting the Kiira Vehicle Plant Site to the national electricity grid was completed, tested and commissioned by Umeme. The construction and installation of a 5.4-kilometre (3 mi) long 6-inch water pipeline connecting the plant site to the municipal water supply system was completed, tested and commissioned by National Water and Sewerage Corporation.

Establishment of the Kiira Vehicle Plant is expected to catalyse investment by small and medium enterprises in the manufacture of vehicle parts, components and autonomy systems (brake pads, seats, bolts and nuts, bumpers, vehicle electronics, navigation system, among others). Kiira Motors Corporation has developed a roadmap for the Domestic Manufacture of Auto-Parts in Uganda and secured accreditation from PPDA for an alternative system for procurement of auto-parts suppliers providing for sample parts development and accreditation of the production part manufacturing system.

Establishment of the Kiira Vehicle Plant is projected to increase demand for the utilization of Uganda's natural resources such as steel from iron ore deposits; plastics from oil and gas, lithium-ion batteries from graphite, lithium and cobalt deposits, vehicle upholstery and interior padding from cotton and leather, glass from silica and sand, among others.

The Kiira Vehicle Plant's contribution to employment in Uganda is estimated at 940 jobs from the start-up investment. The full-scale plant operation is estimated to create over 2,000 direct jobs and 12,000 indirect jobs.

The Kiira Vehicle Plant start-up facilities will have an installed capacity of 5,000 vehicles annually.

In January 2020, the Daily Monitor newspaper reported that the Kayoola electric buses were, as of then, available for sale to the public. KMC plans to manufacture 5,000 electric vehicles annually, beginning in July 2021. The manufacturer plans to procure up to 90 percent of the components in Uganda. It is being assisted by CHTC Motor Company, a subsidiary of the state-owned Sinomach Automobile Company. The long-term plan is to reduce air pollution in Uganda's capital, Kampala.

In August 2021, the progress of construction of the manufacturing plant was reported at 85 percent, with completion expected in the fourth quarter of calendar year 2021. At that time, production of motor vehicles was expected to start during the first half of 2022.

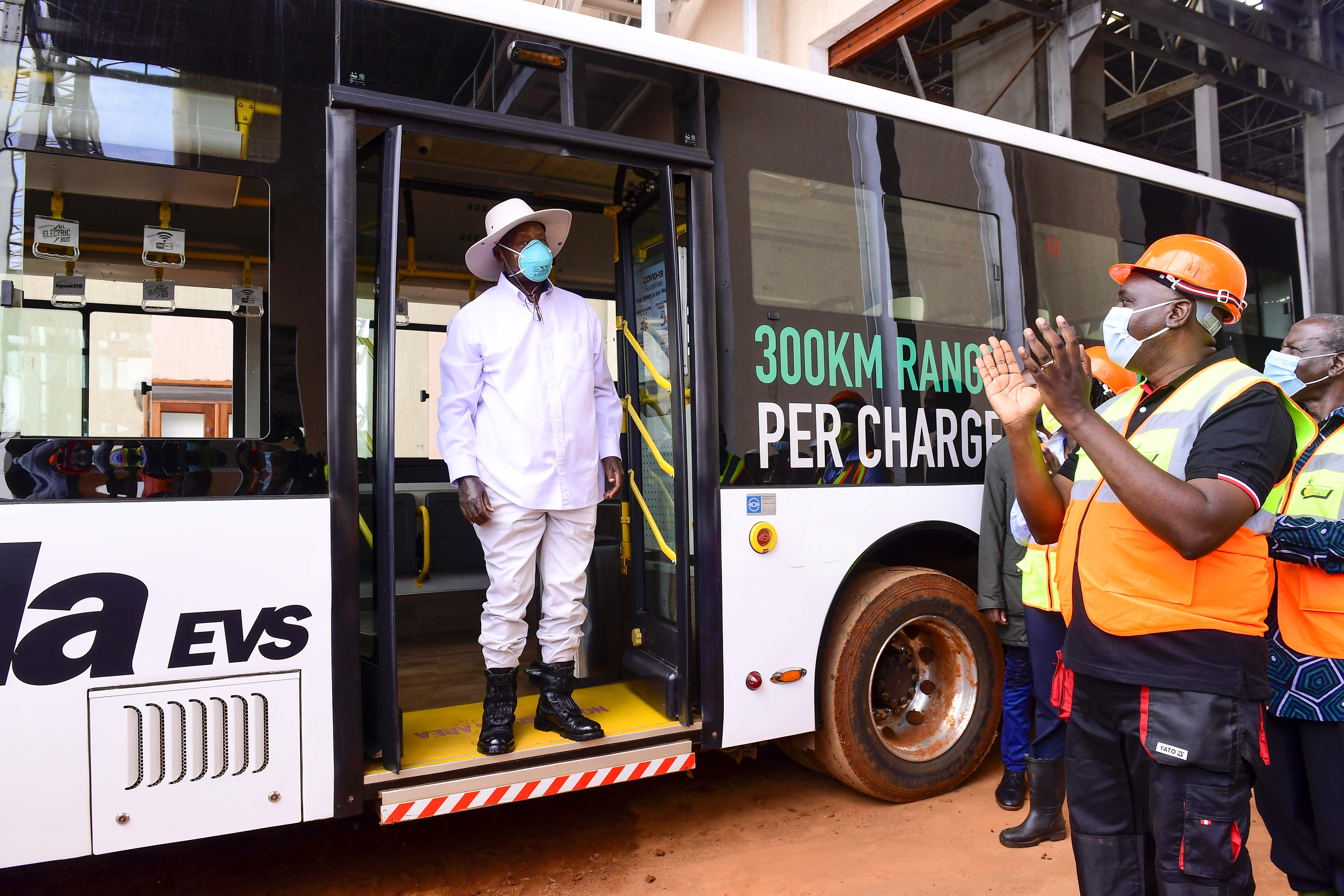
The President of Uganda aboard the Kayoola EVS after Laying the Foundation Stone at the Kiira Vehicle Plant

Yoweri Kaguta Museveni the President of the Republic of Uganda laid the Foundation Stone for the Kiira Vehicle Plant on 14 August 2021. The President at the event directed that there will no longer be any importation of fully built buses into Uganda.

In May 2022, the Ugandan Finance Ministry released the final Ush159 billion ($42 million) of the government's Ush218 billion ($58 million) investment package. This set the stage for completion of the manufacturing plant and the beginning of commercial production anticipated in June 2023. The completed plant was officially commissioned on 27 September 2025. At that time the company had manufactured 37 electric vehicles and 27 diesel buses.

== Products ==
=== Kayoola EVS ===
The Kayoola EVS is the market-entry product of Kiira Motors Corporation. The Kayoola EVS is a Fully Electric, Low Floor City Bus specifically designed for Urban Mass Transportation. At full charge, the Kayoola EVS has a range of up to 300 kilometers making it capable of handling the daily duty cycle. With a sitting capacity of up to 90 passengers.

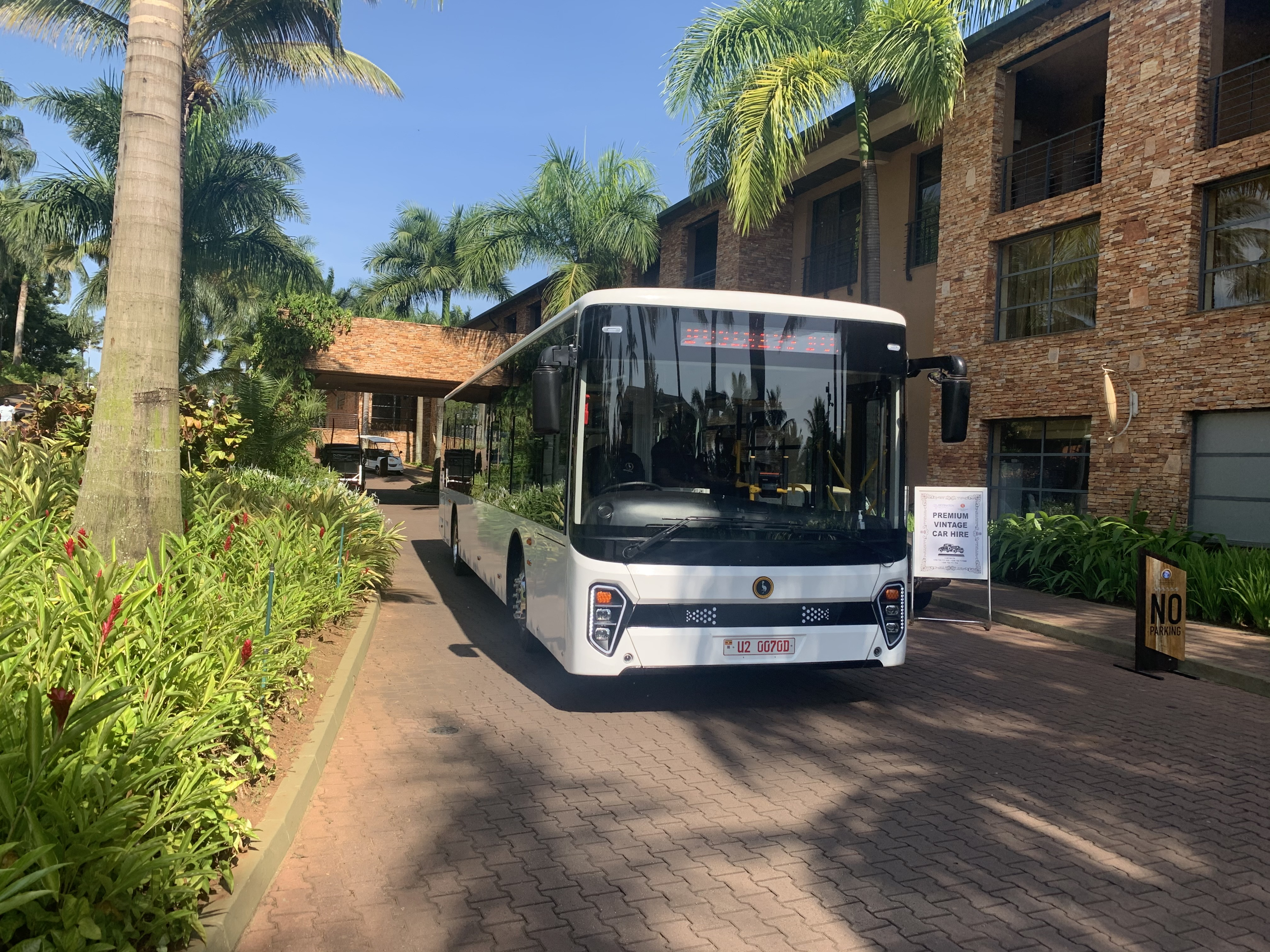
The Kayoola EVS

The Kayoola EVS buses were used to offer Airport Transfer Services between Entebbe International Airport and Munyonyo Commonwealth Resort for delegates during the EU-Uganda Business Forum in March 2020. The buses have also undertaken the following exhibition drills and select shuttle services in Uganda:

1. Transportation of Uganda Government Communication Officers from Ministry of Science, Technology and Innovation Offices in Kampala to the Kiira Vehicle Plant Site in Jinja covering a distance of over 230 kilometers;
2. Transportation of the Rt. Hon. Speaker of Parliament of Uganda from the Source of the Nile Bridge to the Kiira Vehicle Plant Site in Jinja covering a distance of over 20 kilometers;
3. Transportation of Delegates for the Uganda Europe Business Forum between Entebbe International Airport and Commonwealth Resort, Munyonyo in March 2020;
4. Transportation of Uganda Civil Aviation Authority Staff between Kampala and Entebbe International Airport.

As of June 2024, KMC in collaboration with Luweero Industries could manufacture the following varieties of Kayoola EVS buses:

The Varieties of Kayoola EVS Bus Models
Rank	Length	Capacity	Notes
1	18 metres (59 ft)	120	
2	12 metres (39 ft)	90	
3	10 metres (33 ft)	70	
4	8 metres (26 ft)	56	

At that time the company possessed 39 fully assembled buses (27 electric and 12 low-emission diesel). There were orders for about 100 buses from Tanzania, South Africa, Eswatini and Nigeria. The company and Luweero Industries Limited collaborated on fulfilling existing orders and pursuing additional contracts. In August 2024, the Daily Monitor reported that the manufacturing plant was 95 percent complete with commercial commissioning scheduled for October 2024.

=== Kayoola Coach ===
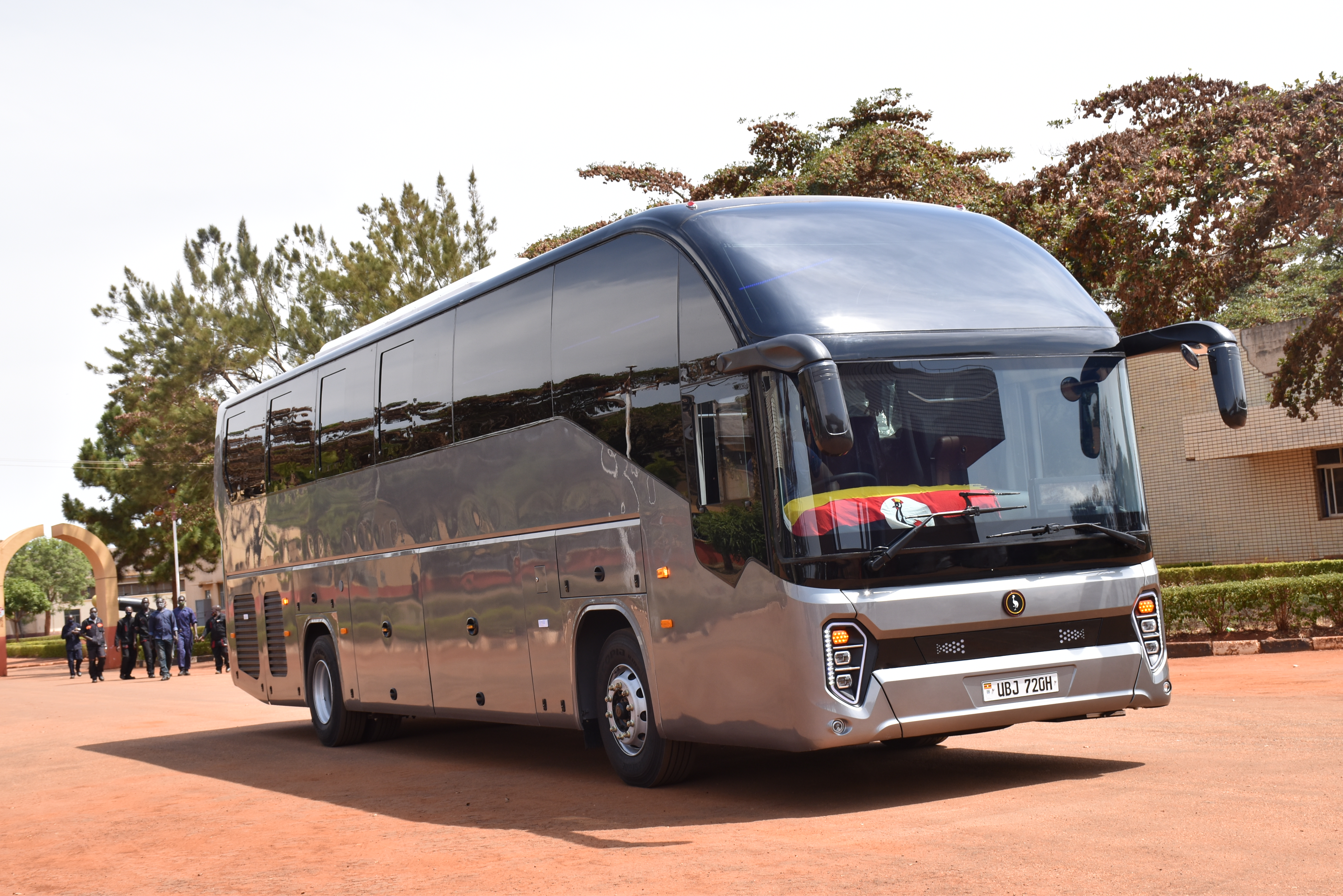
The Kayoola Diesel Coach

The Kayoola Coach is an intercity bus in Africa that is available in both Electric and Diesel variations. The Kayoola Diesel Coach is powered by a 6-cylinder turbo charged inter cooled Cummins engine, providing over 375 horsepower, and able to achieve a top speed of 140 km/h.

=== Kiira EVS ===
The Kiira EVS, a vehicle designed and Built by Kiira Motors Corporation, is a four-seater executive vehicle built off the Kiira EV SMACK platform. The Kiira EVS has undertaken a nationwide tour in excess of 3,650 kilometers in Eastern, Northern and Western Uganda with exhibitions in Masaka, Mbarara, Kabale, Kisoro, Kibaale, Bushenyi, Jinja, Kampala, Pakwach, Nebbi, Arua, Koboko, Oraba, Gulu, Kitgum, Lira, Soroti, Katakwi, Moroto, Mbale, Iganga along with a grand expo at the Africa Now Summit 2019.

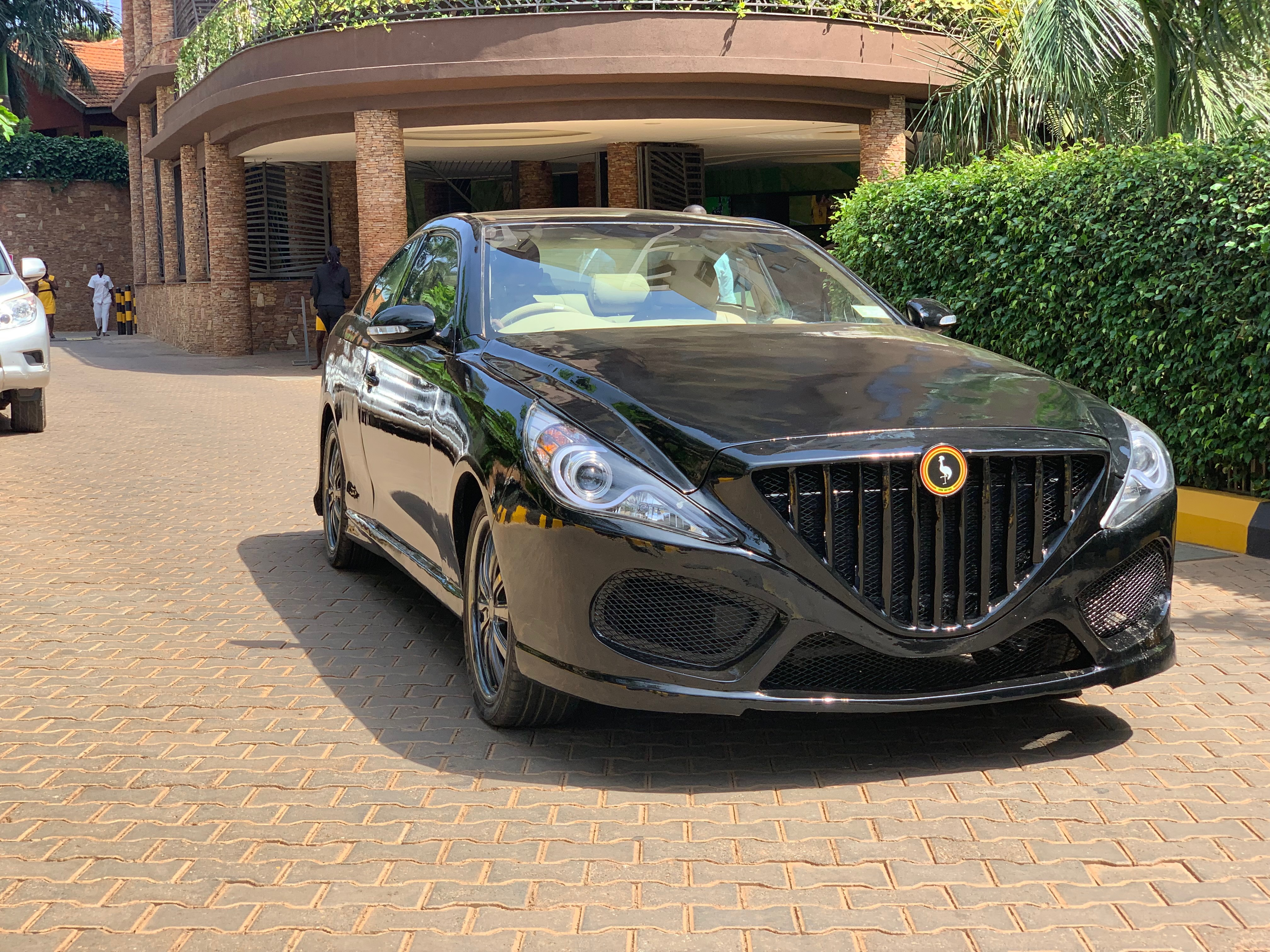
The Kiira EVS

== Awards ==
KMC was recognized for the initiatives in Green Mobility by Frost & Sullivan with the 2016 Frost & Sullivan Visionary Innovation Leadership Award in Sustainable Mobility.

KMC was awarded as the African Company of the Year in the 2021 African Business Leadership Awards.

== Kiira Vehicle Plant Open Day and E-mobility Expo 2024 ==
The Government of Uganda through the Science, Technology and Innovation Secretariat - Office of the President has taken definitive steps towards building a sustainable and scalable e-Mobility Ecosystem. The Government in the National e-Mobility Strategy aims at positioning Uganda as a net source rather than a consumer of e-Mobility Solutions in Africa.

Kiira Motors Corporation, a State Mobility Enterprise was established to champion value addition in the nascent Motor Vehicle Industry in Uganda through Technology Transfer, Contract Manufacturing and Supply Chain Localization. This strategic intervention is poised to contribute to the industrialization agenda envisaged to aid the socioeconomic transformation of Uganda.

Kiira Motors Corporation is honoured to host the Inaugural Kiira Vehicle Plant Open Day and E-Mobility Expo 2024 under the theme “The Future is Green; The Future is Now.” The Expo aims to gather industry leaders, policymakers, innovators, and the public to showcase the Plant's capabilities, products and share knowledge, and foster collaborations within the Mobility Ecosystem. Specifically, the event will:

1. Spotlight on the e-Mobility Ecosystem
2. Provide a platform to inform, Educate & drive Influence for the e- mobility Ecosystem
3. Public Accountability.
4. Connect with Key stakeholder of the Mobility Ecosystem in Uganda
5. Build Trust & Brand Equity

== Bulamu Ventilator ==
In April 2020, Makerere University, in close collaboration with KMC, ResilientAfrica Network, and in partnership with the Ministry of Science, Technology and Innovation started the development of an open design low-cost medical ventilator, called the Bulamu Ventilator, to fill the critical need for ventilators for Uganda and the region, in response to COVID-19. Once the ventilator is developed, tested and optimally operational, the consortium will develop capacity for its mass production. The ventilator will be applied beyond COVID-19 to other severe conditions that require assisted breathing. This technology will substantially improve the capacity for critical care in Uganda.

As of 30 June 2020, the consortium had undertaken Phase I of the development of the Bulamu Ventilator which included Technology Assessment & Open Design Adaptation, Systems Design and Specification, Development of Initial Engineering Prototype for Proof of Functionality and Development of Three (3) Engineering and Validation Prototypes.

Most of the raw materials used in manufacturing the vehicles are sourced locally in Uganda. It is expected to retail at about US$3,000, compared to US$25,000 for an imported medical ventilator.

== Governance ==
In May 2021, a new 13-person board of directors was installed. The board members of the company are as listed in the table below.

Board of Directors of Kiira Motors Corporation
Rank	Director	Position	Notes
1	Sandy Stevens Tickodri-Togboa	Executive Chairman	
2	David Omara Oleke Obong	Permanent Secretary; Ministry of Science, Technology and Innovation	
3	Barnabas Nawangwe	Vice Chancellor; Makerere University	
4	Yusuf Kiranda	Acting University Secretary for Makerere University	
5	Paul Isaac Musasizi	Chief Executive Officer	
6	Basil Ajer	Non-Executive Director	
7	Ronald Rwankangi	Non-Executive Director	
8	Sister Mary Grace Akiror	Non-Executive Director	
9	Aisha Naiga	Non-Executive Director	
10	Henry Alinaitwe	Non-Executive Director	
11	Christine Sekyana	Non-Executive Director	
12	Yudaya Babirye	Non-Executive Director	
13	Charles Barugahare	Non-Executive Director	
Total	13		

== Customers ==
Starting in September 2022, Kiira Motor Corporation began supplying both electric and diesel buses to Tondeka Metro Bus Service (TMBS), to establish a public rapid bus service in the Kampala metropolitan area. Starting with five diesel units, a total of 30 units are expected in 2022. Another 600 buses are planned to be delivered in 2023. The first phase of the TMBS system is planned to absorb 980 buses, with future stages requiring more units.
