= Vietnamese Pharmaceutical Association =

- Hội Dược học Việt Nam
- Abbreviation: VPA
- Formation: 1960
- Type: Professional association
- Headquarters: Vietnam
- Members: pharmacists and pharmaceutical workers
- Parent organization: Vietnam Union of Science and Technology Associations

Vietnamese Pharmaceutical Association (VPA, Vietnamese: Hội Dược học Việt Nam) is a voluntary social and professional association of pharmacists and pharmaceutical workers in Vietnam. It is a member of the Vietnam Union of Science and Technology Associations.

== History ==
In 1955, Vietnam Medical Association was founded with Professor Hồ Đắc Di as president.

In 1960, its name was changed into Vietnam General Association of Medicine, comprising a pharmaceutical section. Later, the Vietnam General Association of Medicine was changed into Vietnam General Association of Medicine and Pharmacy (VNGAMP), and Vietnamese Pharmaceutical Association is one of its members.

In 2002, Vietnamese Pharmaceutical Association was separated from VNGMP and became an independent association.

== Leaderships ==
- 1960–1984: Pharmacist Vũ Công Thuyết is the section head and then president.
- 1984–present: Pharmacist Nguyễn Duy Cương is the president.
