= Committee on Commissions, Statutory Authorities and State Enterprises =

Ugandan parliamentary committee overseeing statutory bodies and state enterprises

- COSASE
- Emblem of the Parliament of Uganda

Parliamentary oversight committee overview
- Formed: 1996
- Jurisdiction: Parliament of Uganda
- Headquarters: Parliament Building, Kampala, Uganda; 0.315°N 32.582°E
- Parliamentary oversight committee executive: Medard Lubega Sseggona (2024-2026), Joel Ssenyonyi (2021-2024), Chairperson
- Parent department: Parliament of Uganda
- Website: https://www.parliament.go.ug/

The Committee on Statutory Authorities, State Enterprises, and State-Owned Enterprises (COSASE) is a permanent accountability committee of the Parliament of Uganda. It oversees reports of the Auditor General and public corporations, state enterprises and statutory bodies' income and expenditure, and reports to Parliament for action and consideration.

== Mandate ==
COSASE's jurisdiction flows from Parliament's constitutional duty to monitor all expenditure of public funds and from the Rules of Procedure that establish financial accountability committees to examine Auditor General reports. The committee reviews audit findings and may examine the income and expenditure of any public corporation or state enterprise and related statutory authorities, then make recommendations to the House.

== Legal and institutional basis ==
Parliament's oversight mandate is grounded in Articles 90 and 164 of the Constitution of Uganda. The committee system and accountability committees are operationalized through the Parliament's Rules of Procedure, as reflected in official handbooks and guidance used by the institution. The Parliament's official committees portal documents COSASE activities, including appearances by agencies and enterprises in response to audit queries.

== Activities ==
COSASE holds public hearings, summons accounting officers and board members of statutory authorities and state enterprises, and issues reports to Parliament based on the Auditor General's findings and committee inquiries. Entities that have appeared before the committee include electricity distributors, agricultural agencies and regulatory commissions, among others, in connection with audit follow-up and value-for-money concerns.

== Notable inquiries ==
=== Bank of Uganda closures (2018–2019) ===
In 2018 and 2019 COSASE conducted public hearings into the closure of several commercial banks by the Bank of Uganda, taking evidence from central bank officials and affected shareholders. The committee tabled a report to Parliament recommending individual accountability of officials implicated in irregular closure processes, sparking wide public debate and subsequent calls for enforcement action.

=== Uganda Airlines oversight ===
In 2022 COSASE opened hearings into governance and operational matters at Uganda Airlines following audit concerns, including summoning airline leadership and seeking documentation on procurement and finances. Proceedings attracted national attention and debate on the scope and impact of parliamentary oversight over the carrier. Subsequent public and political commentary continued in later years as Parliament and government actors debated how to handle investigations related to the airline.

=== Other oversight actions ===
In 2025 the Speaker redirected a COSASE probe on works at the Nakivubo drainage channel to a separate fact-finding team, reflecting ongoing institutional debates about committee mandates and methods in high-profile inquiries. Statutory agencies and state enterprises routinely appear before COSASE to respond to Auditor General findings on financial statements and performance, as shown in public communications by government bodies after hearings.

== Criticism and reception ==
Observers and media have questioned the effectiveness of follow-through after COSASE probes, including delays or disputes over enforcement of recommendations adopted by Parliament in the aftermath of inquiries. Coverage of the Uganda Airlines hearings in 2022 highlighted tensions around openness, media access and potential risks to participants, which drew broader public discussion about parliamentary oversight practices.

== Chairpersons ==
Chairpersons of the Committee on Commissions, Statutory Authorities and State Enterprises (COSASE)
| Name | Term | Parliament | Notable activities |
|---|---|---|---|
| Abdu Katuntu | 2.5 years (ended January 2019) | 10th Parliament | Chaired COSASE and led the high-profile investigation into the closure of seven commercial banks by the Bank of Uganda. |
| Munyagwa Mubarak Sserunga | 2.5 years (began early 2019) | 10th Parliament | Replaced Abdu Katuntu as chairperson. |
| Joel Ssenyonyi | 2021 – January 2024 | 11th Parliament | Served as chairperson until his appointment as Leader of the Opposition and was known to have led hearings that sparked public interest like the Uganda Airlines oversight. |
| Medard Sseggona | January 2024 – present | 11th Parliament | Replaced Joel Ssenyonyi; noted for producing numerous committee reports within a single year. |

== See also ==
- Parliament of Uganda
- Office of the Auditor-General (Uganda)
- Public Accounts Committee (Uganda)
