= Hackman (surname) =

Hackman is an English surname of German origin (German: Hackmann). Notable people of the name include the following:

- Alfred Hackman (1811–1874), English librarian
- Barbara Franklin (née Hackman; b. 1940), U.S. Secretary of Commerce
- Gene Hackman (1930–2025), American actor and novelist
- James Hackman (1752–1779), English murderer
- Joseph "Buddy" Hackman (1906–1987), American multi-sport player and coach
- Kevin Hackman, ring name of professional wrestler Andy Leavine
- Luther Hackman (b. 1974), American baseball player
- Marika Hackman (b. 1992), English musician
- Paul Hackman (1952–1992), Canadian guitarist
- Robert Hackman (1941–2018), Ghanaian steeplechase runner
- Walter Hackman (1916–2001), Finnish entomologist

== See also ==
- Hackmann, surname
