= Metaborborus =

Scientific classification
- Kingdom: Animalia
- Phylum: Arthropoda
- Class: Insecta
- Order: Diptera
- Family: Sphaeroceridae
- Subfamily: Copromyzinae
- Genus: Metaborborus; Vanschuytbroeck, 1948

Type species
- Borborus calcaratus Vanschuytbroeck, 1948

Synonyms
- Dudaborborus Papp, 1980

Genus of flies

Metaborborus is a genus of flies belonging to the family Sphaeroceridae.

== Species ==
- M. calcaratus (Vanschuytbroeck, 1948)
- M. flavior (Vanschuytbroeck, 1959)
- M. glaber Norrbom & Kim, 1985
- M. hackmani Norrbom & Kim, 1985
- M. mitus Norrbom & Kim, 1985
- M. parastichosus Norrbom & Kim, 1985
- M. pilifer (Vanschuytbroeck, 1948)
- M. pollinosus (Hackman, 1965)
- M. ruwenzoriensis Norrbom & Kim, 1985
- M. saliens (Duda, 1923)
- M. schumanni (Papp, 1980)
- M. spinifer (Vanschuytbroeck, 1948)
- M. stichosus Norrbom & Kim, 1985
- M. superciliosus Norrbom & Kim, 1985
- M. trichosus Norrbom & Kim, 1985
- M. wittei Norrbom & Kim, 1985
