= Bataringaya Basil Rwankwene =

Ugandan politician and accountant

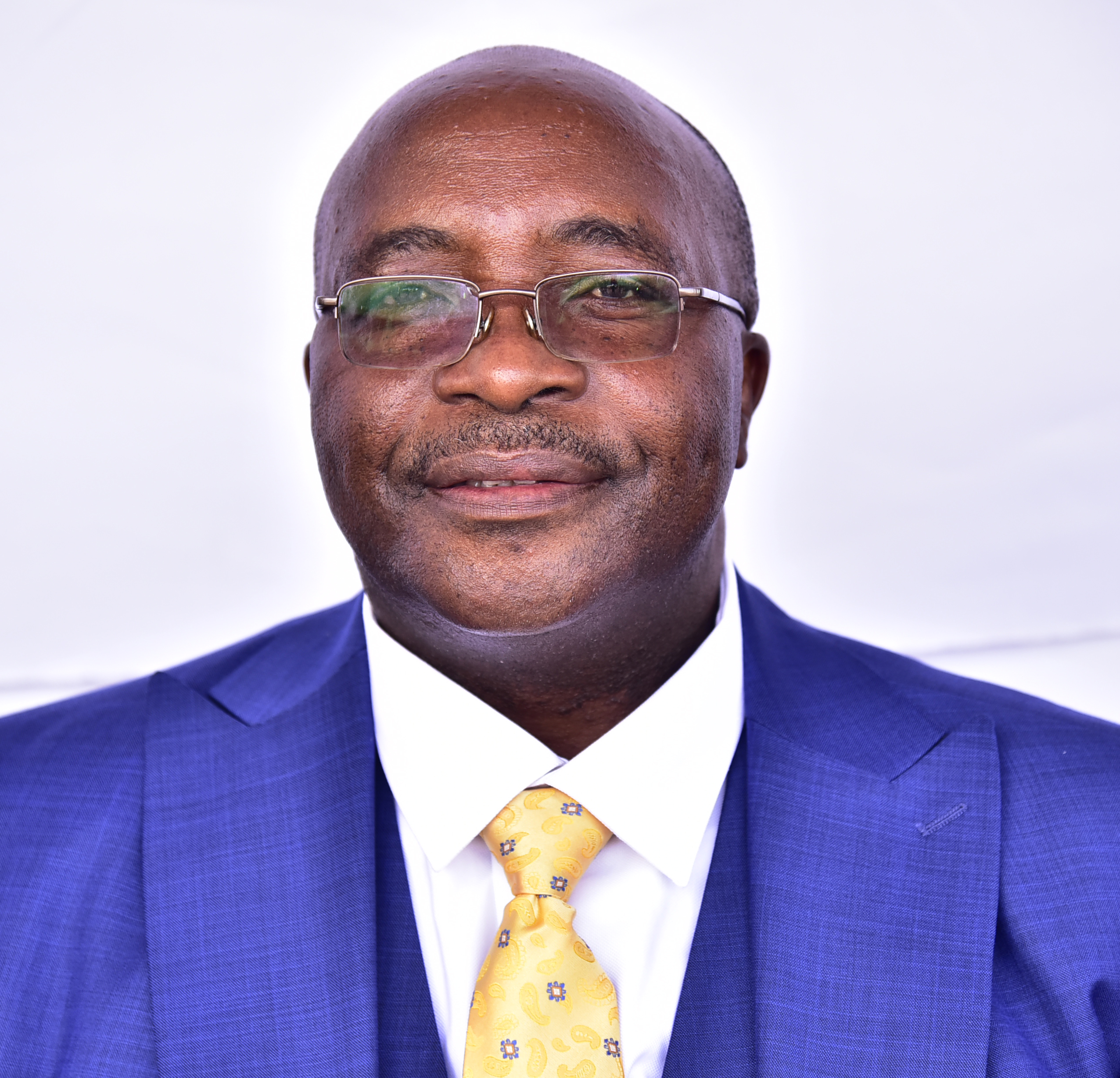

Member of Parliament
- In office 2021–2026
- Constituency: Kashari North County

Personal details
- Born: 25 October 1960 (age 65)
- Party: National Resistance Movement
- Spouse: Jamelia Kaggwa
- Occupation: Accountant, politician

Bataringaya Basil Rwankwene is a Ugandan politician and accountant who represented Kashari North County' in the Parliament of Uganda as a member of the National Resistance Movement (NRM).

== Early life and education background ==
Bataringaya Basil Rwankwene was born on 25 October 1960.

== Career ==
Bataringaya Basil Rwankwene is an accountant by profession. He later entered elective politics and contested the Kashari North County parliamentary seat on the ticket of the National Resistance Movement (NRM) and in the 2021 general election, he won the seat and became a member of the Parliament of Uganda.

During the 11th parliament, Rwankwene served as a member of the Public Accounts Committee (Central Government) from January 2024 - May 2026. He was also a member of the Committee on Finance, Planning and Economic Development from July 2024 through the 2025–2026 parliamentary period.

== Personal life ==
He is married to his spouse Ms Jamelia Kaggwa

== See also ==
- Parliament of Uganda
- National Resistance Movement
