= Medard Lubega Sseggona =

Ugandan lawyer and politician (born 1975)

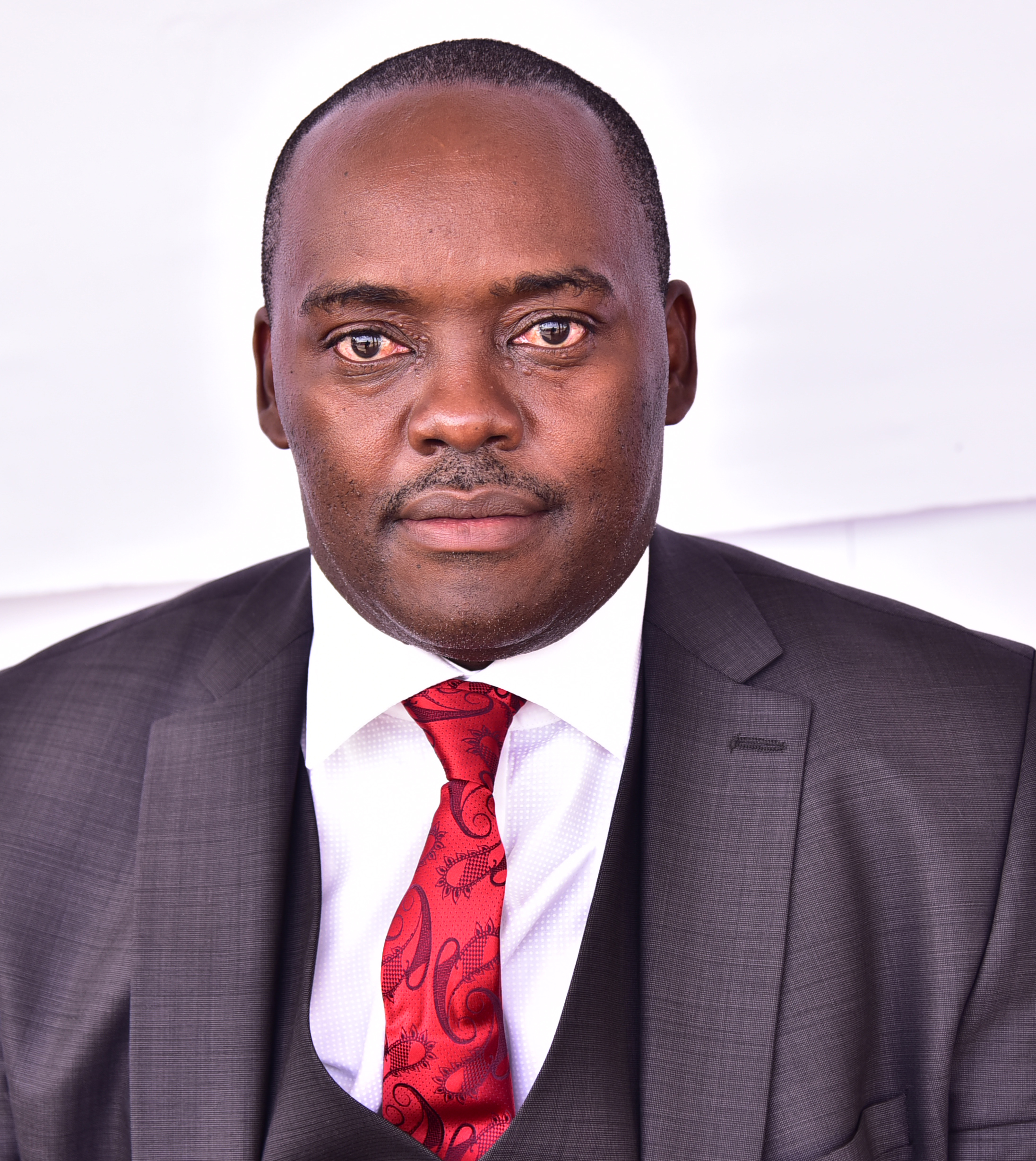

Member of Parliament for Busiro County East
- Incumbent
- Assumed office 2011

Chairperson, Committee on Commissions, Statutory Authorities and State Enterprises (COSASE)
- Incumbent
- Assumed office 2024

Chairperson, AFROPAC
- Incumbent
- Assumed office 2025

Minister of Information, Buganda Kingdom (Mengo)
- In office 2006–2010

Personal details
- Born: September 1, 1975 (age 51) Uganda
- Party: Independent (2025–present)
- Other political affiliations: National Unity Platform (2020–2025); Democratic Party (Uganda) (–2020)
- Spouse: Diana Lubega
- Education: Makerere University (LLB); Law Development Centre (LDC)
- Occupation: Lawyer, Politician
- Known for: Human rights litigation, constitutional law, parliamentary accountability

Medard Lubega Sseggona (born 1 September 1975), also known as Akalya Amaggwa, is a Ugandan lawyer and politician. He served as the Member of Parliament for Busiro County East in Wakiso District from 2011 to 2026, completing three consecutive terms before losing his seat in the 2026 general election. He has served as the Chairperson of the Parliamentary Public Accounts Committee on Commissions, Statutory Authorities, and State Enterprises (COSASE) and in 2025 was elected Chairperson of the African Organization of Public Accounts Committees (AFROPAC). He is also one of the managing directors for Lukwago and Co advocates alongside Erias Lukwago, (Kampala City Lord Mayor).

== Early life and education ==
Sseggona was born on 1 September 1975. He attended Mayungwe Primary School before joining Entebbe Parents Secondary School for his O-level education, and Caltec Academy Makerere for his A-level education. He earned a Bachelor of Laws (LLB) degree from Makerere University in 2001, and obtained a Diploma in Legal Practice from the Law Development Centre in 2002.

== Career ==
=== Legal career ===
After completing his legal training, Sseggona worked as a lecturer at Makerere University Business School in 2002–2003. Since 2003, he has been a managing partner at Lukwago & Co. Advocates alongside Erias Lukwago, a law firm known for representing political activists and contesting key constitutional issues. He was also one of the lawyers during Bobi Wine's presidentila election petition

=== Political career ===
In 2006 to 2010, Ssegona served as the Minister of Information/Spokesperson for the Buganda Kingdom (Mengo) before joining active politics then elected to Parliament in 2011, representing Busiro East.

He is currently the Chairperson of COSASE, the Public Accounts Committee that oversees statutory bodies and state enterprises. In July 2025, he was elected Chair of AFROPAC, a continental public-accounts body for parliamentary oversight.

He was associated with the Democratic Party (DP) before joining National Unity Platform (NUP) in 2020. In June 2025, he announced ambitions to succeed Robert Kyagulanyi (“Bobi Wine”) as NUP leader but in October 2025, he quit NUP and declared he would run as an independent in the 2026 elections for Busiro East going against Mathis Walukaga, NUP candidate.

== Personal life ==
Sseggona is married to Diana Lubega. He sometimes goes by the nickname "Akalya Amagwa" (or "Kalyamaggwa"), which is Luganda for "the one who eats thorns."

== See also ==
- Parliament of Uganda
- Committee on Commissions, Statutory Authorities and State Enterprises
- Buganda Kingdom
- National Unity Platform (NUP)
- Robert Kyagulanyi
- Erias Lukwago
