= International Science Council =

Global non-governmental organization representing natural and social sciences

- Abbreviation: ISC
- Formation: July 4, 2018; 8 years ago
- Merger of: International Council for Science (ICSU); International Social Science Council (ISSC)
- Type: International
- Headquarters: Paris, France
- Key people: Robbert Dijkgraaf (President); Salvatore Aricò (CEO)
- Website: council.science

The International Science Council (ISC) is an international non-governmental organization that unites scientific bodies at various levels across the social and natural sciences. The ISC was formed with its inaugural general assembly on 4 July 2018 by the merger of the former International Council for Science (ICSU) and the International Social Science Council (ISSC), making it one of the largest organisations of this type.

Daya Reddy, a mathematician, served as the ISC's inaugural president. Sir Peter Gluckman, a pediatrician, biomedical scientist, and science-policy expert, was elected president in October 2021. Other ISC's inaugural officers elected for the term of 2018–2021 were Elisa Reis (vice president), Jinghai Li (vice president), Renée van Kessel (treasurer), and Alik Ismail-Zadeh (secretary). Until February 2022, Heide Hackmann served as the council's CEO. In 2023, Salvatore Aricò was elected chief executive officer.

== Activities ==
The council convenes and mobilizes the international scientific community on issues of major scientific and public importance. Activities focus on three areas of work:

- Stimulating and supporting international scientific research and scholarship, and communicating science that is relevant to international policy issues;
- Promoting the ability of science to contribute to major issues;
- Defending the free and responsible practice of science.

The council is involved in co-sponsorship of a number of international research programmes, networks and committees.

The council awards the Stein Rokkan Prize for Comparative Social Science Research.

The council's present activities are guided by the Action Plan 2022-2024: Science and Society in Transition. At the heart of the Action Plan is a selection of projects and programmes that are relevant to all scientific fields and all parts of the world.

== Structure ==
The council is governed by a governing board and is advised by a number of advisory bodies in thematic areas such as space, polar, climatic, and data research. It is headquartered in Paris with a regional office in Colombia. The officers of the governing board are currently Peter Gluckman (president), Motoko Kotani (president-elect), Anne Husebekk (vice-president for freedom and responsibility in science), Salim Abdool Karim (vice-president for outreach and engagement), and Sawako Shirahase (vice-president for finance of the council).

The ISC's next assembly is scheduled to be held in Beijing in 2026.

== Members ==
As of 2025, the International Science Council has 131 member organizations, 43 member unions and associations, and 23 affiliated members.

=== Member unions and associations ===
Acronym	Name	Scientific field
4S	Society for Social Studies of Science	Social studies of science and technology (STS)
CIE	International Commission on Illumination	Illumination
IALS	International Association of Legal Science	Legal science
IASSA	International Arctic Social Sciences Association	Social science relevant to the Arctic
IAU	International Astronomical Union	Astronomy
ICA	International Cartographic Association	Cartography
ICIAM	International Council for Industrial and Applied Mathematics	Mathematics
ICO	International Commission for Optics	Optics
IFSM	International Federation of Societies for Microscopy	Microscopy
IGU	International Geographical Union	Geography
IMU	International Mathematical Union	Mathematics
INQUA	International Union for Quaternary Research	Quaternary Period
IPRA	International Peace Research Association	Peace Research
IPSA	International Political Science Association	Political Science
ISA	International Sociological Association	Sociology
ISPRS	International Society for Photogrammetry and Remote Sensing	Photogrammetry and Remote Sensing
IUBS	International Union of Biological Sciences	Biology
IUCr	International Union of Crystallography	Crystallography
IUFoST	International Union of Food Science and Technology	Food science and Food Technology
IUFRO	International Union of Forest Research Organizations	Forestry
IUGG	International Union of Geodesy and Geophysics	Geodesy and Geophysics
IUGS	International Union of Geological Sciences	Geology
IUHPST	International Union of History and Philosophy of Science	History of Science and Philosophy of Science
IUIS	International Union of Immunological Societies	Immunology
IUMRS	International Union of Materials Research Societies	Materials science
IUMS	International Union of Microbiological Societies	Microbiology
IUNS	International Union of Nutritional Sciences	Nutrition
IUPAB	International Union for Pure and Applied Biophysics	Biophysics
IUPAC	International Union of Pure and Applied Chemistry	Chemistry
IUPAP	International Union of Pure and Applied Physics	Physics
IUPESM	International Union for Physical and Engineering Sciences in Medicine	Medical physics
IUPHAR	International Union of Basic and Clinical Pharmacology	Pharmacology
IUPS	International Union of Physiological Sciences	Physiology
IUPsyS	International Union of Psychological Science	Psychology
IUSS	International Union of Soil Sciences	Soil science
IUSSP	International Union for the Scientific Study of Population	Demography
IUTAM	International Union of Theoretical and Applied Mechanics	Mechanics
IUTOX	International Union of Toxicology	Toxicology
UIS	International Union of Speleology	Speleology
URSI	International Union of Radio Science	Radio science
WAPOR	World Association for Public Opinion Research	Public opinion research
WAU	World Anthropological Union	Anthropology

=== National members ===
Country	Member organization
Albania	Academy of Sciences (ASA)
Angola	Foundation of Science and Development
Argentina	National Scientific and Technical Research Council (CONICET)
Armenia	Armenian National Academy of Sciences (NAS RA)
Australia	Australian Academy of Science
Austria	Austrian Academy of Sciences
Azerbaijan	Azerbaijan National Academy of Sciences (ANAS)
Bangladesh	Bangladesh Academy of Sciences (BAS)
Belarus	National Academy of Sciences of Belarus (NASB)
Belgium	Royal Academies for Science and the Arts of Belgium (RASAB)
Benin	National Academy of Sciences, Arts and Letters (ANSALB)
Bolivia	Academia Nacional de Ciencias de Bolivia (ANCB)
Bosnia & Herzegovina	Academy of Sciences and Arts of Bosnia and Herzegovina (ANUBiH)
Bosnia & Herzegovina	Academy of Sciences and Arts of the Republika Srpska (ANURS)
Botswana	Ministry of Infrastructure Science and Technology
Brazil	Brazilian Academy of Sciences (ABC)
Brazil	Association Nacional de Pos-Graduacao e Pesquisa em Ciencias Sociais (ANPOCS)
Bulgaria	Bulgarian Academy of Sciences (BAS)
Burkina Faso	Centre National de la Recherche Scientifique et Technologique (CNRST)
Cameroon	Cameroon Academy of Sciences (CAS)
Canada	National Research Council (Canada) (NRC)
Chile	Academia Chilena de Ciencias
China	China Association for Science and Technology (CAST)
China	Chinese Academy of Social Sciences (CASS)
Colombia	Academia Colombiana de Ciencias Exactas, Fisicas y Naturales
Costa Rica	Academia Nacional de Ciencias (Costa Rica)
Côte d'Ivoire	Académie des sciences, des arts, des cultures d'Afrique et des diasporas africaines (ASCAD)
Cuba	Cuban Academy of Sciences
Denmark	Royal Danish Academy of Sciences and Letters
Dominican Republic	Academy of Sciences of the Dominican Republic
Egypt	Academy of Scientific Research and Technology (ASRT)
El Salvador	Viceministerio de Ciencia y Tecnología de El Salvador
Estonia	Estonian Academy of Sciences
Eswatini	National Research Council (Eswatini)
Ethiopia	Ethiopian Science and Technology Agency
Finland	Council of Finnish Academies
France	French Academy of Sciences
Georgia	Georgian National Academy of Sciences
Germany	German Research Foundation (DFG)
Ghana	Ghana Academy of Arts and Sciences
Greece	Academy of Athens
Guatemala	Academia de Ciencias Médicas Fisicas y Naturales de Guatemala
Honduras	National Academy of Sciences of Honduras
Hungary	Hungarian Academy of Sciences
India	Indian Council of Social Science Research (ICSSR)
India	Indian National Science Academy (INSA)
Indonesia	National Research and Innovation Agency (BRIN)
Iran	University of Tehran
Iraq	Ministry of Science and Technology
Ireland	Royal Irish Academy
Israel	Israel Academy of Sciences and Humanities
Italy	National Research Council
Jamaica	Scientific Research Council
Japan	Science Council of Japan
Jordan	Royal Scientific Society
Kazakhstan	Kazakhstan Academy of Sciences
Kenya	Kenya National Academy of Sciences
Laos	Lao National Science Council
Latvia	Latvian Academy of Sciences
Lebanon	Lebanese Academy
Lebanon	National Council for Scientific Research
Lesotho	Department of Science and Technology
Lithuania	Lithuanian Academy of Sciences
Luxembourg	Luxembourg National Research Fund
Madagascar	Ministère de l'Enseignement Supérieur et de la Recherche Scientifique
Malawi	National Commission for Science and Technology
Malaysia	Academy of Sciences Malaysia
Mauritius	Mauritius Academy of Science (MAST)
Mexico	Mexican Academy of Sciences
Mexico	Consejo Mexicano de Ciencias Sociales (COMECSO)
Moldova	Academy of Sciences of Moldova
Monaco	Centre Scientifique de Monaco
Mongolia	Mongolian Academy of Sciences
Montenegro	Montenegrin Academy of Sciences and Arts
Morocco	Hassan II Academy for Science and Technology
Mozambique	Scientific Research Association of Mozambique (AICIMO)
Namibia	National Commission on Research, Science and Technology (NCRST)
Nepal	Nepal Academy of Science and Technology (NAST)
Netherlands	Royal Netherlands Academy of Arts and Sciences
New Zealand	Royal Society Te Apārangi
Nigeria	Nigerian Academy of Science
North Korea	Academy of Sciences of the Democratic People's Republic of Korea
North Macedonia	Macedonian Academy of Sciences and Arts
Norway	Norwegian Academy of Science and Letters
Norway	University of Bergen
Oman	Research Council of Oman
Pakistan	Pakistan Association for the Advancement of Science
Panama	University of Panama
Peru	Academia Nacional de Ciencias
Philippines	National Research Council
Philippines	Philippine Social Science Council (PSSC)
Poland	Polish Academy of Sciences
Portugal	Lisbon Academy of Sciences
Romania	Romanian Academy
Russia	Russian Academy of Sciences (RAS)
Rwanda	College of Science and Technology (Rwanda) (KIST)
Saudi Arabia	King Abdulaziz City for Science and Technology (KACST)
Senegal	Senegal Academy of Science and Technology (ANSTS)
Serbia	Serbian Academy of Sciences and Arts
Seychelles	Seychelles National Parks Authority
Singapore	Singapore National Academy of Science
Slovakia	Slovak Academy of Sciences (SAS)
Slovenia	Slovenian Academy of Sciences and Arts
South Africa	Human Sciences Research Council of South Africa (HSRC)
South Africa	National Research Foundation (NRF)
South Korea	Korean Social Science Research Council (KOSSREC)
South Korea	National Academy of Sciences of the Republic of Korea
South Korea	Korean Academy of Science and Technology (KAST)
Spain	Ministry for Science and Innovation (MCIN)
Sri Lanka	National Science Foundation of Sri Lanka (NSF)
Sudan	National Centre for Research (NCR)
Sweden	Royal Swedish Academy of Sciences
Switzerland	Swiss Academy of Humanities and Social Sciences (SAHS)
Switzerland	Swiss Academies of Arts and Sciences
Taiwan	Academia Sinica
Tajikistan	Tajik Academy of Sciences
Tanzania	Tanzania Commission for Science and Technology
Thailand	National Research Council of Thailand
Togo	Chancellerie des Universités du Togo
Tunisia	Tunis El Manar University
Turkey	The Science Academy Society of Turkey
Turkey	Turkish Academy of Sciences (TÜBA)
Uganda	Uganda National Council for Science and Technology (UNCST)
Ukraine	National Academy of Sciences of Ukraine (NAS)
United Kingdom	British Academy
United Kingdom	Royal Society
United States	National Academy of Sciences (NAS)
Uruguay	Comisión Consejo Nacional de Innovacion Ciencia y Tecnologia (CONICYT)
Uzbekistan	Uzbekistan Academy of Sciences (UzAS)
Vatican City	Pontifical Academy of Sciences
Venezuela	Fondo Nacional de Ciencia, Tecnología e Innovación (CONICIT)
Vietnam	Vietnam Union of Science and Technology Associations (VUSTA)
Zambia	Zambia Academy of Sciences
Zimbabwe	Research Council of Zimbabwe (RCZ)

=== Transnational members ===
- Arab Council for the Social Sciences (ACSS)
- Association of Asian Social Science Research Councils (AASSREC)
- Caribbean Academy of Sciences
- Consejo Latinoamericano de Ciencias Sociales (CLACSO)
- Council for the Development of Social Science Research in Africa (CODESRIA)
- Latin American Faculty of Social Sciences (FLACSO)
- Union Académique Internationale (UAI)
- Organization for Social Science Research in Eastern and Southern Africa (OSSREA)
- University of the South Pacific

=== Affiliated members ===
- Academy of Social Sciences (ACSS)
- African Academy of Sciences (AAS)
- Association of Academies and Societies of Sciences in Asia (AASSA)
- European Association of Development and Training Institutes (EADI)
- European Consortium for Political Research (ECPR)
- Fédération Internationale des Géomètres (FIG)
- Global Young Academy (GYA)
- International Arctic Science Committee (IASC)
- International Association of Applied Psychology (IAAP)
- International Commission for Acoustics (ICA)
- International Council for Laboratory Animal Science (ICLAS)
- International Council for Scientific and Technical Information (ICSTI)
- International Federation of Library Associations and Institutions (IFLA)
- International Foundation for Science (IFS)
- International Institute for Applied Systems Analysis (IIASA)
- International Society for Digital Earth (ISDE)
- International Society for Porous Media (InterPore)
- International Union for Vacuum Science, Technique and Applications (IUVSTA)
- Pacific Science Association (PSA)
- Scientific Committee on Problems of the Environment (SCOPE)
- The World Academy of Sciences (TWAS)
- Transnational Institute (TNI)

=== GeoUnions ===
A subset of ISC dealing with Earth and space sciences forms the GeoUnions network:

- International Astronomical Union
- International Cartographic Association
- International Geographical Union
- International Union of Quaternary Research
- International Society for Photogrammetry and Remote Sensing
- International Union of Geodesy and Geophysics
- International Union of Geological Sciences
- International Union of Speleology
- International Union of Soil Sciences
- International Union of Radio Sciences

The ISC GeoUnions partially overlap with the UN-GGIM Geospatial Societies.

== Former members ==
Since 2024, there are members that have departed from the council:

=== Member unions and associations ===
- International Economic Association (IEA)
- International Society for Ecological Economics (ISEE)
- International Union of Biochemistry and Molecular Biology (IUBMB)

=== National members ===
- Czech Academy of Sciences (CAS)
- Economic and Social Research Council (ESRC)
- Scientific and Technological Research Council of Turkey (TÜBİTAK)
- Social Sciences and Humanities Research Council (SSHRC)

=== Affiliated members ===
- Association of Science-Technology Centers (ASTC)
- International Association for Hydro-Environment Engineering and Research (IAHR)
- International Federation for Information Processing (IFIP)
- International Federation of Data Organizations for Social Science (IFDO)(no longer exists)
- International Studies Association (ISA)
- International Water Association (IWA)
- Social Science Research Council (SSRC)
