= Public Accounts Committee (Uganda) =

Parliamentary committee in Uganda

- Emblem of the Parliament of Uganda

Parliamentary Committee overview
- Formed: 1995
- Jurisdiction: Government of Uganda
- Status: Active
- Headquarters: Parliament Building, Kampala, Uganda; 0.315°N 32.582°E
- Parliamentary Committee executive: HON. MUWANGA KIVUMBI MUHAMMAD, Chairperson; Deputy Chairperson
- Parent department: Parliament of Uganda
- Key documents: Constitution of Uganda (1995); Public Finance Management Act (2015); National Audit Act (2008)
- Website: Parliament of Uganda

The Public Accounts Committee (Uganda) (PAC) is a permanent accountability committee of Parliament of Uganda responsible for the task of scrutinizing audited accounts of public spending by the Government of Uganda. It scrutinizes reports of the Auditor General laid before Parliament under Article 163 of the Constitution of Uganda, concerning the legality, efficiency and effectiveness of public funds usage.

PAC is widely recognised as one of Uganda's key institutions of financial oversight. It holds public officials accountable for audit queries and financial irregularities identified in government ministries, departments and agencies (MDAs). The committee is traditionally chaired by a Member of Parliament from the Opposition, in line with parliamentary practice to strengthen checks and balances.

== History ==
The Public Accounts Committee was established following the promulgation of the 1995 Constitution, as part of reforms to strengthen democratic governance and public financial accountability. Although parliamentary oversight existed during previous administrations, formalization of PAC reflected efforts to align Uganda’s public finance management with international accountability standards..

Significant reforms to PAC's mandate were enacted through the Public Finance Management Act, 2015 (PFMA), which reinforced Parliament’s role in oversight of financial reports and increased the accountability of accounting officers..

Due to workload and increasing audit backlogs, Parliament later created two Public Accounts Committees: one responsible for Central Government and another for Local Government.

== Mandate and functions ==
The key functions and roles of the Public Accounts Committee include:

- Examining reports of the Auditor General on public expenditure by ministries, departments and agencies (MDAs)
- Scrutinising financial irregularities, misappropriation, waste and inefficiencies in the use of public funds
- Summoning accounting officers and public officials to answer audit queries
- Recommending recovery of lost public funds or sanctions against responsible officers
- Referring cases of corruption or fraud to law enforcement agencies such as the Inspector General of Government (IGG), Director of Public Prosecutions (DPP) and the Anti-Corruption Court
- Presenting findings and recommendations to the plenary of Parliament

== Legal framework ==
PAC derives its authority from:

- Article 90 of the Constitution of Uganda - oversight powers of parliamentary committees.
- Article 163(4) of the Constitution - reporting role of Auditor General to Parliament.
- Rules of Procedure of Parliament - define committee operations.
- Public Finance Management Act (2015) - strengthens accountability of accounting officers.
- National Audit Act (2008) - outlines roles of Auditor General.

== Composition ==
The committee is composed of Members of Parliament appointed by the Parliament of Uganda Appointments Committee. Its chairperson is traditionally a member of the opposition. Membership reflects Uganda’s multi-party parliamentary system, with proportional representation according to party strength.

=== Leadership ===
The following have served as Chairpersons of the Public Accounts Committee (Central Government):

Year	Chairperson	Political Party
2006–2011	Nandala Mafabi	Forum for Democratic Change
2011–2016	Kassiano Wadri	Independent (formerly FDC)
2016–2021	Angelline Osegge	Forum for Democratic Change
2021–present	Medard Sseggona Lubega	Democratic Party (Uganda)

Keys: NUP (9) NRM (27) FDC (1) JEEMA (1) UPC (1) Independents (7)= 45 members

Membership of the Public Accounts Committee (Central Government) January 2024 – May 2026
Photo	Name	Constituency	Party
	Modoi Isaac	Lutseshe County	NRM
	Mawanda Michael Maranga	Igara County East	NRM
	Kyooma Xavier Akampurira	Ibanda County North	NRM
	Angura Frederick	Tororo County South	NRM
	Kamugo Pamela	DWR, Budaka	NRM
	Ruyonga Joseph	Hoima West Division	NRM
	Ssejjoba Isaac	Bukoto County Mid-West	NRM
	Ababiku Jesca	DWR, Adjumani	NRM
	Wamakuyu Ignatius	Mudimi Elgon County	NRM
	Afidra Olema Ronald	Lower Madi County	NRM
	Muhumuza David	Mwenge County North	NRM
	Nakazibwe Hope Grania	DWR, Mubende	NRM
	Bataringaya Basil Rwankwene	Kashari County North	NRM
	Opendi Sarah Achieng	DWR, Tororo	NRM
	Wanda Richard	Bungokho County Central	NRM
	Lokwang Philips	Ilukol Napore County West	NRM
	Namujju Cissy Dionizia	DWR, Lwengo	NRM
	Nambeshe John Baptist	Manjiya County	NRM
	Mugabi Susan	DWR, Buvuma District	NRM
	Kugonza Emely	Buyanja County East	NRM
	Tayebwa Herbert	Kashongi County	NRM
	Tinkasiimire Barnabas	Buyaga County West	NRM
	Nekesa Victor (Col)	UPDF Representative	NRM
	Katali Loy	DWR, Jinja	NRM
	Nsegumire Muhamad Kibedi	Mityana County North	NRM
	Nebanda Florence Andiru	DWR, Butaleja	NRM
	Muwanga Kivumbi Muhammad	Butambala County	NUP
	Namugga Gorreth	Mawogola County South	NUP
	Ssewungu Joseph Gonzaga	Kalungu County West	NUP
	Ssaazi Godfrey	Gomba County East	NUP
	Lukyamuzi David	Kalwanga Busujju County	NUP
	Kyebakutika Manjeri	CWR, Jinja City	NUP
	Nambooze Teddy	Mpigi District	NUP
	Nandala-Mafabi Nathan	Budadiri County West	FDC
	Kabuusu Moses	Kyamuswa County	FDC
	Okae Bob	Kwania County North	UPC
	Basalirwa Asuman	Bugiri Municipality	JEEMA
	Chemutai Everlyn	DWR, Bukwo	Independents
	Aogon Silas	Kumi Municipality	Independents
	Ocen Peter	Kole County South	Independents
	Kayanga Baroda	Kamuli Municipality	Independents
	Amero Susan	DWR, Amuria	Independents
	Tusiime Julius Karuhanga	Rwampara County East	Independents
	Twesigye Nathan Itungo	Kashari County South	Independents

Party-wise membership of Public Accounts Committee (Central Government, 2024–2026)
1. NRM 27 (60%) 60 (58.7%)
2. NUP 9 (20%) 20 (19.6%)
3. Independents 7 (15.6%) 15.6 (15.3%)
4. FDC 1 (2.2%) 2.2 (2.15%)
5. JEEMA 1 (2.2%) 2.2 (2.15%)
6. UPC 1 (2.2%) 2.2 (2.15%)

== Working procedure ==
The committee operates by reviewing reports of the Auditor General and scheduling hearings with accounting officers. Officials are interrogated publicly, and proceedings are recorded and compiled into reports laid before Parliament for adoption. PAC recommendations may include:

- Surcharges on officers responsible for financial loss
- Disciplinary actions
- Criminal prosecution referrals
- Policy and reform directives to improve public expenditure control

== Notable investigations ==
Over the years, the Public Accounts Committee has undertaken several high-profile investigations involving government ministries and agencies. These include:

Year / Period	Institution / Case	Nature of Investigation	Outcome / Impact
2012	Office of the Prime Minister (OPM) Relief Funds Scandal	PAC investigated the mismanagement of funds meant for post-war rehabilitation in Northern Uganda and Karamoja.	Led to arrests and prosecutions of several officials; exposed major weaknesses in donor fund accountability.
2015	Uganda National Roads Authority (UNRA) Corruption Probe	Examined billions lost in road construction contracts and inflated project costs.	Triggered institutional reforms in UNRA, including staff restructuring and stronger procurement oversight.
2018	National Identification and Registration Authority (NIRA) National ID Project Review	Investigated cost and procurement irregularities in the implementation of the National ID system.	Highlighted procurement flaws and led to calls for tighter contract supervision in national ICT projects.
2022	Uganda Airlines Spending Inquiry	Scrutinized aircraft procurement processes and corporate governance issues at the national airline.	Exposed governance lapses and prompted recommendations for management reforms and transparency measures.
2023	Ministry of Finance – Petroleum Fund Accountability	Investigated management of oil revenues and the Petroleum Fund under MoFPED.	Raised concerns about transparency and access to oil revenue data, pushing for improved fiscal reporting standards.
2024	Ministry of Education – COVID-19 Funds Audit	Scrutinized unaccounted funds meant for education continuity during pandemic school closures.	Recommended recovery of misused funds and stricter monitoring of emergency budget allocations.

== Relationship with other accountability institutions ==
PAC collaborates closely with oversight institutions to promote public financial accountability:

Institution / Office	Relationship to the Public Accounts Committee (PAC)	Key Role / Function
Office of the Auditor General (OAG)	Submits annual and special audit reports to PAC for scrutiny.	Provides the evidence base for PAC investigations into public expenditure, mismanagement, or irregularities.
Inspector General of Government (IGG)	Acts on PAC recommendations involving corruption, abuse of office, or maladministration.	Investigates and enforces anti-corruption measures, often collaborating with PAC on follow-up actions.
Director of Public Prosecutions (DPP)	Receives case files or recommendations from PAC (via OAG or IGG) for prosecution.	Prosecutes individuals or entities implicated in audit and PAC findings.
Accountant General of Uganda	Appears before PAC to respond to audit queries raised by the Auditor General’s reports.	Provides clarifications, financial statements, and accountability reports to justify public spending.
Ministry of Finance, Planning and Economic Development (MoFPED)	Implements PAC and OAG recommendations related to public finance reforms and accountability systems.	Ensures budgetary controls, fiscal discipline, and policy reforms are in line with audit findings.
Committee on Commissions, Statutory Authorities and State Enterprises (COSASE)	Works complementarily with PAC — focuses on oversight of parastatals and statutory bodies, while PAC focuses on central and local government accounts.	Reviews OAG reports specific to commissions and state enterprises, reinforcing PAC’s overall accountability mandate.

== Criticism ==
PAC has faced recurrent criticism including:

- Delayed implementation of recommendations - Many PAC recommendations are not enforced by ministries or police.
- Political interference - Some analysts argue that politically sensitive cases may face delays.
- Limited enforcement powers - PAC can only recommend actions, not enforce sanctions directly.
- Audit backlog - Persistent backlog of Auditor General reports reduces timely accountability.

== See also ==
- Parliament of Uganda
- Office of the Auditor General (Uganda)
- Committee on Commissions, Statutory Authorities and State Enterprises
- Committee on National Economy (Uganda)
