= Ministry of Science, Technology and Innovation =

Ministry of Science, Technology and Innovation may refer to:

- Ministry of Science, Technology and Innovation (Brazil)
- Ministry of Science, Technology and Innovation of Denmark
- Ministry of Science, Technology and Innovation (Malaysia)
- Ministry of Science, Technology and Innovation (Nepal)
- Ministry of Science, Technology and Innovation (Uganda)
