= Gorreth Namugga =

Ugandan politician

Hon. Gorreth Namugga
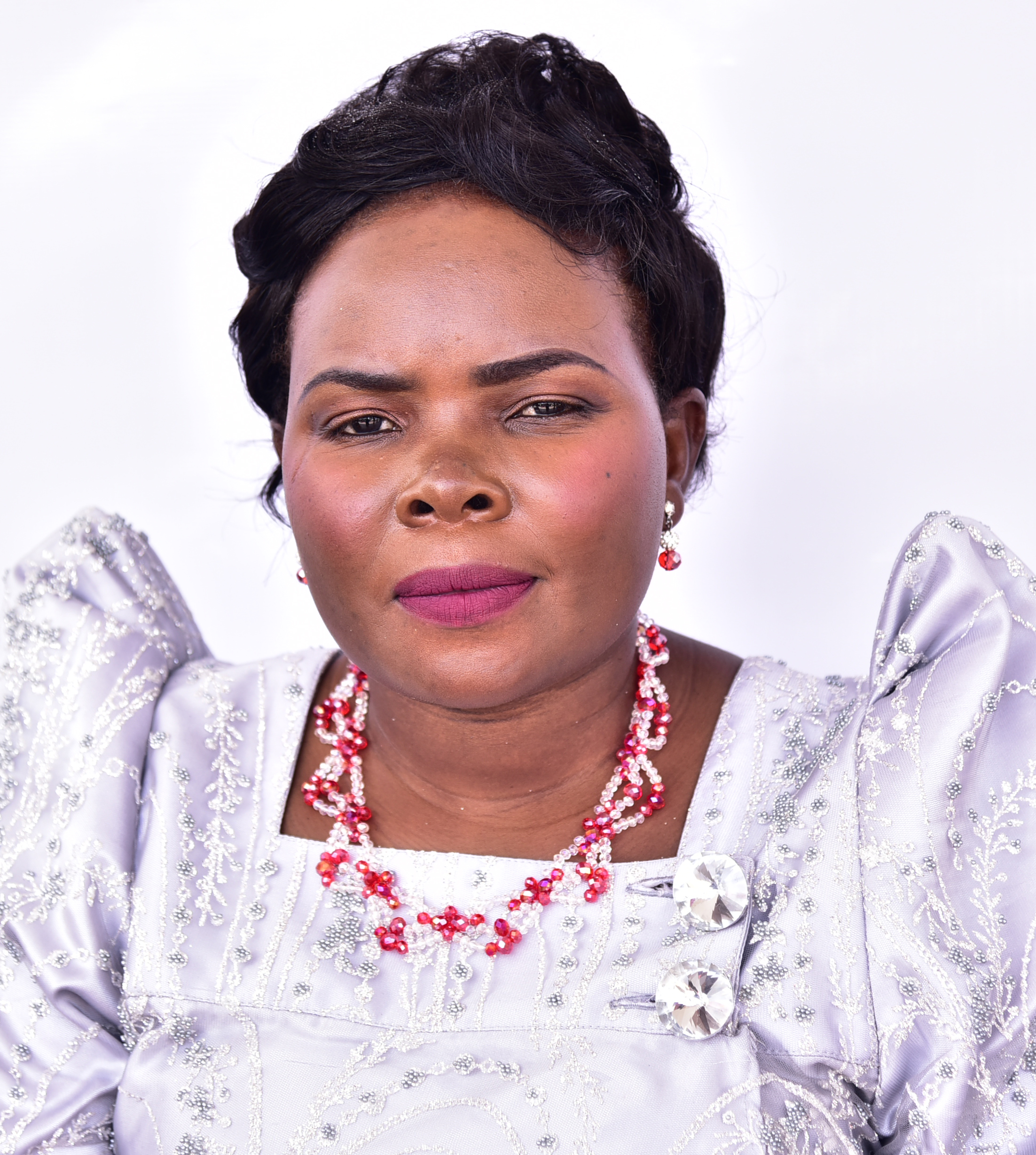
- Born: Uganda
- Citizenship: Ugandan
- Occupation: Politician
- Known for: First opposition MP elected in Sembabule District since 1986
- Office: Member of Parliament for Mawogola County South
- Political party: National Unity Platform (NUP)

Gorreth Namugga is a Ugandan politician. In 2021, she was elected as the representative Member of Parliament for Mawogola county, Ssembabule district on the National Unity Platform ticket. She is from the leading opposition party, National Unity Platform. Namugga was the first Opposition politician to win an elective position in Sembabule district since 1986.

== Work experience ==
She served as the District Service Commission Chairperson and a Proprietor of Schools in Sembabule. She was the former Principal Procurement Officer for Masaka city.

== Parliamentary duties ==
Namugga served as the shadow minister of Science, Innovations & Technology. Namugga presented the minority report on the 2022/2023 budget during the 11th parliament. She also served as the Deputy Chairperson of the Public Accounts Committee (PAC) in the 11th parliament.

== Political career ==
Namugga served as the member of Parliament for Mawogola county, Ssembabule district in the 11th parliament of Uganda. In 2025, she was nominated for re-election for the same post in the same district. In 2026, during the general elections she lost to Byuma Oswald Dez who had contested on the National Resistance Movement (NRM) flag.

== See also ==
- Parliament of Uganda
- 11th Parliament of Uganda
- Masaka city
- 2021 Ugandan general election
- List of Members in the eleventh Parliament of Uganda
