= Tondeka Metro Bus Service =

Ugandan bus company

Overview
- Locale: Kampala Metropolitan Area, Uganda
- Transit type: Bus service
- Number of lines: In development
- Number of stations: In development
- Chief executive: Peter Kimbowa (executive chairman)
- Headquarters: Union House; Luthuli Avenue; Bugolobi, Kampala, Uganda
- Website: Homepage

Operation
- Began operation: September 1, 2022; 4 years ago
- Operator: Tondeka Metro Limited

Technical
- Top speed: 80 km/h (50 mph)

Tondeka Metro Bus Service
- Location within Kampala

General information
- Coordinates: 00°18′37″N 32°37′09″E

The Tondeka Metropolitan Kampala Bus Service (TMBS) is the proposed principal public transport operator in the Kampala metropolitan area. Expected to start in September 2020, the bus system, Tondeka Metro, proposes to serve the city of Kampala, Uganda's capital, the city of Entebbe, including Entebbe International Airport, Buloba, Nsangi, Ssabagabo, Mukono, Kira Town, Matugga, Wakiso, and the areas in Mukono District and Wakiso District that connect with these urban centers.

== History ==
The Kampala metropolitan area (Kampala, Entebbe, Wakiso District and Mukono District) had a total population of approximately four million residents according to the August 2014 national population census. More than half of this total population pour onto the narrow roads leading to Kampala city center to go to work, school, hospitals, court, banks or to access other government and private services. This leads to gridlock on the city streets and roads as commuter taxis (kamunye), motorcycle taxis (boda boda), private automobiles, street hawkers, pedestrians and VIP convoys jostle for space.

== System ==
The major stake holders in a modern, functional, sustainable, public transit system in Kampala's metropolitan area have come together and propose a bus system starting with 980 commuter buses, procured new from the manufacturers, Ashok Leyland, in India. However, a presidential directive in 2021 banned the importation of foreign fully or partly assembled buses. Kiira Motors Corporation became the only potential suppliers of the required buses. The first five buses came online in September 2022.

== Stakeholders ==
The major stakeholders in Tondeka Metro Bus Service include, but are not limited to, the following:

Major stakeholders In Tondeka Metro Bus Service project
Rank	Name of stakeholder	Description
1	Office of the President of Uganda	The President has directed the Ministry of Finance to prioritize the funding of the Tondeka Metro initiative.
2	Ugandan Ministry of Works and Transport	Lead Government agency in harmonizing planning
3	Kampala Capital City Authority	Lead government agency in execution and implementation, including the assignment of routes, bus stages and parking
4	Kiira Motors Corporation	Suppliers of electric and diesel-fueled buses to the project
5	Taxi Owners' Associations	Will become co-owners in the business and relocate their commuter taxis to other cities and towns or sell them to other investors who will relocate them
6	Taxi drivers, conductors and stage touts	Will be given priority when hiring bus drivers, bus conductors and bus terminal managers
7	Mukono District Administration and Wakiso District Administration	Will licence the business to operate in their jurisdictions and share in the revenue of the business together with Kampala Capital City Authority, through taxation
8	Other local administration governments including Kira Town, Mukono City, Entebbe City, Nansana, Ssabagabo, Kajjansi and others	Need to facilitate the passage of commuter buses through their jurisdictions, including the designation of bus stages
9	Uganda Police Force	The Road Traffic Division of the Uganda Police Force enforces traffic rules and regulations
10	The travelling public	They are expected to benefit from less congested roads and streets, with faster, affordable and safer trips. Even those who do not use public transport will benefit due to less congested roads.
11	Uganda National Roads Authority	Will need to repair some roads, widen some to accommodate the large buses and also build new roads
12	Other stakeholders	

== Routes ==
As of January 2020, the following bus routes are suggested, to start with:

Proposed routes of Tondeka Metro Bus Service
Rank	From	To	Distance one way
1	Kampala	Mukono	25 kilometres (16 mi)
2	Kampala	Nsangi	18 kilometres (11 mi)
3	Kampala	Buloba	19.5 kilometres (12 mi)
4	Kampala	Wakiso	21 kilometres (13 mi)
5	Kampala	Matugga	19 kilometres (12 mi)
6	Kampala	Entebbe Airport	41 kilometres (25 mi)
7	Kampala	Ggaba	12 kilometres (7 mi)

== Fare structure ==
On 11 December 2019, The Post Media Limited (PML Daily) online publication reported that a single route is expected to cost USh1,200 (approx. US$0.33); unlimited daily travel to cost USh3,500 (approx. US$1.00); Shs18,000 (approx. US$5.00) for a weekly card and Sh55,000 (approx. US$15.00) for a monthly travel card. Passengers are expected to pay using Radio Frequency Identification Cards (rfid-Cards) to swipe their way on board, with no cash payment allowed on the bus.

== Hours of operation ==
The organizers of the Tondeka Metro Bus Service plan to have the buses run 24/7, with provisions for people with disabilities and pregnant mothers.

== Funding ==
The funding modalities have not been finalized. At a minimum, both the Uganda Government through the Ministry of Finance and high net-worth individuals who own fleets of commuter taxis and motorcycle taxis are expected to fund the project as a public-private partnership enterprise. The initial investment is reported to be US$200 million (USh737.9 billion).

== Expansion plans ==
The initial shipment of 400 buses in September 2020 is expected to be followed by 200 buses the following month and every month thereafter until the total comes to 980 buses. If and when the initial project succeeds, more buses will be imported to expand the project to other areas of the Kampala metropolis.

== Recent developments ==
In April 2022, it was reported that TMBS had selected Israel-made Optibus, the artificial intelligence software to carry out mass transport planning. The initial 1,080 fleet is expected to grow to over 3,000 by 2032. The World Bank is also reported to participate in the funding of this project.

In September 2022, Tondeka Bus Service received a batch of five buses from Kiira Motors Corporation, being the first of six similar deliveries planned in 2022, bringing the total to 30 units. Another 600 buses were expected in 2023. The current buses are diesel coaches, but fully electric units are expected among future deliveries.

== See also ==
- Kampala–Entebbe Road
- Entebbe–Kampala Expressway
- Kampala Northern Bypass Highway
- Kampala Southern Bypass Highway
