= Office of the Auditor-General (Uganda) =

Supreme audit institution of the Government of Uganda

Office of the Auditor General of Uganda
Agency overview
- Formed: 1929
- Preceding agency: Directorate of the Colonial Audit Office (Uganda)
- Jurisdiction: Government of Uganda
- Headquarters: Kampala, Uganda
- Agency executive: Edward Akol, Auditor General
- Parent agency: Government of Uganda
- Website: oag.go.ug

The Office of the Auditor General of Uganda (OAG) is the Uganda's supreme audit institution. It audits and reports on the public accounts of Uganda and all public offices and entities that use public resources. This mandate is derived from Article 163 of the Constitution of Uganda and the National Audit Act, 2008, with supporting provisions in the Public Finance Management Act, 2015.

== History ==
Uganda created a public audit function during the colonial period as an extension of the Directorate of the Colonial Audit Office based in the United Kingdom. The OAG traces formal establishment to 1929, with the modern mandate codified in the 1995 Constitution.

== Legal framework ==
- The Constitution of Uganda, Article 163. Defines the office, appointment and removal of the Auditor General, and powers to audit public accounts.
- National Audit Act, 2008. Gives effect to Articles 154 and 163, establishes the OAG as a body corporate, sets functions, independence, staffing, and oath of office.
- Public Finance Management Act, 2015. Provides for government accounting, internal audit, audit committees, and grants the Auditor General access to internal audit reports and consolidated statements.

== Mandate and functions ==
The OAG audits and reports to Parliament on the public accounts of central government, local governments, statutory bodies, state enterprises, and projects funded from public resources. It also approves withdrawals from the Consolidated Fund as provided in the national legal framework. The Core work includes financial audits, compliance audits, value for money audits, forensic audits, and IT audits.

== Reporting ==
The Auditor General submits annual audit reports to Parliament. Consolidated reports are publicly available for each financial year, including FY 2023–24 and FY 2022–23.

== Leadership ==
Auditor General Edward Akol serves as Auditor General, appointed and sworn in in July 2024, succeeding John F. S. Muwanga who served for more than two decades.

| Auditor-General | Years in Office |
|---|---|
| G. H. Kabiswa | 1968–1975 |
| Leo Outeke | 1975–1992 |
| James Kahooza | 1992–2001 |
| John F. S. Muwanga | 2001–2005, and then again 2007–2024 |
| Edward Akol | July 2024–present |

== Affiliations ==
The OAG is a member of the International Organization of Supreme Audit Institutions (INTOSAI) and participates in affiliated regional bodies, including AFROSAI and AFROSAI-E. Uganda also engages in the INTOSAI Working Groups on Extractive Industries and on Environmental Auditing.

== Recognition ==
AFROSAI-E awarded the OAG Uganda the Best Performance Audit prize in 2025, noting its benchmark work on performance auditing. Earlier recognition included awards for reports on equitable and affordable access to education for learners with special needs.

== See also ==
- Parliament of Uganda
- INTOSAI
- AFROSAI
- Office of the President of Uganda
- Public Accounts Committee (Uganda)
