= Heide Hackmann =

- Occupation: Interim Director

Academic background
- Education: University of Twente

Academic work
- Discipline: Science and Technology Studies

Heide Hackmann is the Interim Director of the Future Africa Institute and Strategic Advisor on Transdisciplinary and Global Knowledge Networks at the University of Pretoria in South Africa. She was the CEO of the International Science Council, an international organization of national and international science councils.

== Early life ==
Hackmann studied contemporary social theory at the University of Cambridge, UK, and holds a PhD in science and technology studies from the University of Twente in the Netherlands.

== Career ==
Hackmann worked as a science policy maker, researcher and consultant in the Netherlands, Germany, the UK, and South Africa. She was Head of the Department of International Relations and Quality Assessment of the Royal Netherlands Academy of Arts and Sciences.

From 2007 to 2015, Hackmann was Executive Director of the International Social Science Council (ISSC), and from 2015 to 2018, she was Executive Director of the International Council for Science (ICSU). These two organisations merged, in July 2018, to form the International Science Council, of which she is the current CEO.

Heide Hackmann co-chaired the Technology Facilitation Mechanism (TFM), UN group supporting the implementation of the Sustainable Development Goals. She is also a member of a number of international boards relating to science and sustainability. These include the Scientific Advisory Board of the Potsdam Institute for Climate Impact Research in Germany, and the Stockholm Resilience Centre in Sweden.
