= Sandy Stevens Tickodri-Togboa =

Ugandan engineer and politician

- Born: Sandy Stevens Tickodri-Togboa; 29 October 1949 (age 75); Arua, Uganda
- Title: State Minister for Higher Education and Technology
- Spouse: Edith Natukunda-Togboa
- Scientific career
- Institutions: Makerere University

Sandy Stevens Tickodri-Togboa (born 29 October 1949) is a Ugandan academic and politician. From 2015 to 2016, he was State Minister for Higher Education and Technology in the Cabinet of Uganda. He was appointed to that position on 1 March 2015, replacing John Chrysostom Muyingo; in the reshuffle of June 2016, however, he was not reappointed. As a cabinet minister, he was also an ex officio member of parliament. Before his ministerial appointment, he was a deputy vice chancellor at Makerere University, the oldest and largest of the eight public universities in Uganda.

== Background and education ==
Tickodri-Togboa was born in Oduluba Village, approximately 3 kilometres (2 mi), east of downtown Arua. His mother died when he was three years old. His father, a construction worker, remarried after Togboa's mother died. Tickodri-Togboa attended Arua Junior School for his middle school studies He attended Nyakasura School before joining Nairobi University, where he studied electrical engineering. Later, he obtained a Master of Science from Makerere University and a doctorate from the University of Odesa in Ukraine.

== See also ==
- Government of Uganda
