= Samuel E. Hackman Building =

- U.S. National Register of Historic Places
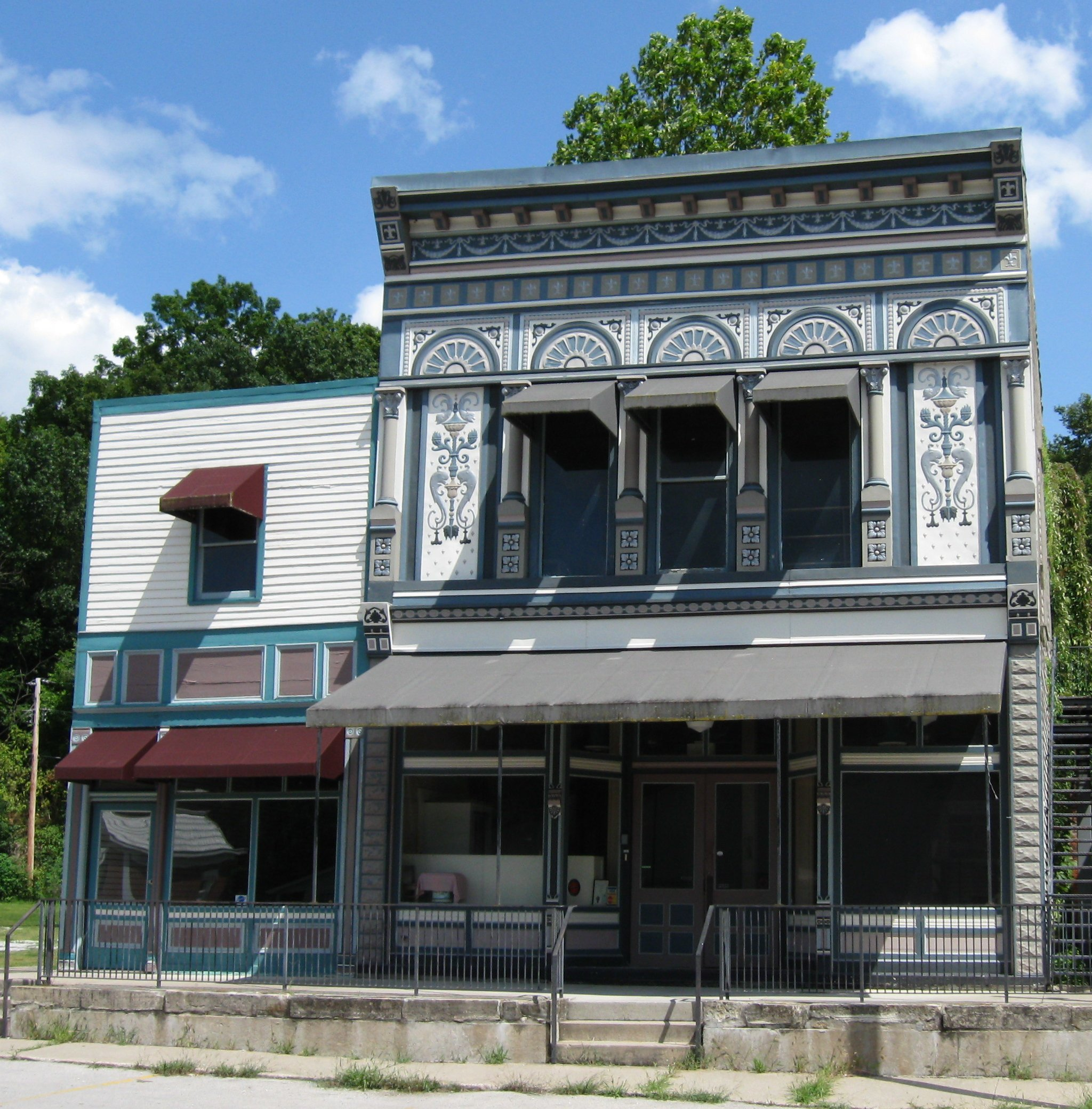

- Location within Missouri Location within the United States
- Nearest city: 30 S. Second St., Hartsburg, Missouri
- Coordinates: 38°41′41″N 92°18′31″W
- Area: less than one acre
- Built: 1897, c. 1903
- Architectural style: Late Victorian
- NRHP reference No.: 98001501
- Added to NRHP: December 10, 1998

The Samuel E. Hackman Building, also known as the A.L. Barner Hardware Company Building, is a historic commercial building located at Hartsburg, Missouri. It was built in 1897 and expanded about 1903. It is a two-story, rectangular frame building with a flat facade. It features the original elaborate iron and frame storefront.

It was added to the National Register of Historic Places in 1998.
