= Hackman's Gate =

Hamlet in Worcestershire, England

Coordinates: 52.399°N 2.158°W

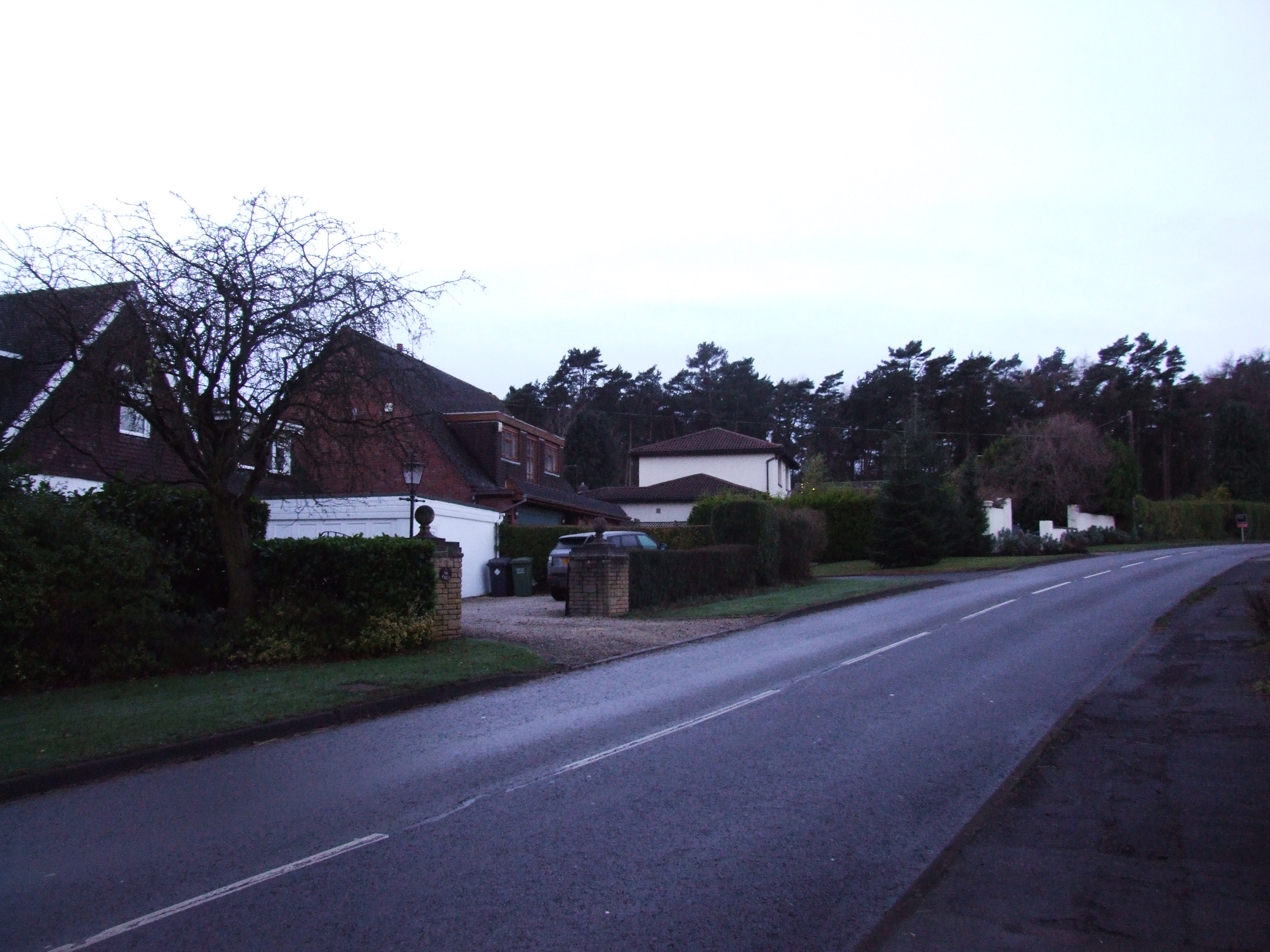
- Belbroughton Road

- Location within Worcestershire
- Civil parish: Broome
- District: Wyre Forest
- Shire county: Worcestershire
- Region: West Midlands
- Country: England
- Sovereign state: United Kingdom
- Police: West Mercia
- Fire: Hereford and Worcester
- Ambulance: West Midlands

Hackman's Gate is a hamlet in the parish of Broome, in the Wyre Forest district of Worcestershire, England.

An earlier name is Hangman's Gate.
