= Office of the President of Uganda =

Executive support institution

Office of the President (Uganda)
- Coat of arms of Uganda

- Presidential Standard of Uganda

Agency overview
- Formed: 1962
- Jurisdiction: Government of Uganda
- Headquarters: Kampala, Uganda
- Minister responsible: Milly Babirye Babalanda, Minister for the Presidency; Vice President of Uganda
- Agency executives: Yoweri Kaguta Museveni, President of Uganda; Jessica Rose Epel Alupo, Vice president of Uganda
- Parent department: Government of Uganda
- Key documents: Constitution of Uganda (1995); Local Government Act, Cap 243
- Website: www.op.go.ug

The Office of the President of Uganda is the central executive support institution that assists the President and Vice President to perform constitutional and administrative duties. It provides policy coordination, cabinet support, communications, and oversight of presidential programs. It also supervises Resident District Commissioners (RDCs) and City Commissioners (CCs) across the country.

== Constitutional and legal basis ==
The 1995 Constitution of Uganda vests executive authority in the President and establishes the Office's core mandate through Articles 98, 99, and 108. These provisions define the offices of the President and Vice President and require the President to execute and maintain the Constitution and the laws of Uganda.

Resident District Commissioners are provided for under Article 203 of the Constitution and related provisions of the Local Government Act, which set out their functions and appointment.

== Functions ==
The Office supports the Presidency, coordinates cabinet affairs, monitors delivery of government programs, and manages national protocol in line with approved guidelines. State House provides logistical, security, and welfare support to the President, the Vice President, and their families. The Office also hosts or coordinates special units and initiatives that channel citizen complaints, track implementation of the government manifesto, and organize national functions.

== Attached Agencies and Units ==
Category	Agency / Unit	Role
Security & Intelligence	Internal Security Organisation (ISO)	Internal intelligence and counter-intelligence
	External Security Organisation (ESO)	Foreign intelligence
	Special Forces Command (SFC)*	Elite security unit responsible for presidential protection
Governance & Oversight	Inspectorate of Government (IGG)*	Anti-corruption and leadership code enforcement
	State House Anti-Corruption Unit	Investigates corruption complaints from citizens
	Manifesto Implementation Unit	Tracks implementation of NRM Government Manifesto
	Directorate for Socio-Economic Monitoring	Monitors delivery of government programs
Community & Political Mobilisation	Office of the National Chairman (ONC) – NRM	Political mobilization under the NRM
	National Secretariat for Patriotism Clubs	Patriotism promotion among youth
	Resident District Commissioners (RDCs) & City Commissioners (RCCs)	President's representatives in districts and cities
Research & Policy Support	Presidential Advisory Committees (PACs)	Sector-specific advisory units to the President
	Presidential CEO Forum	Interface with private sector leaders
Economic and Special Programs	Presidential Initiative on Skilling the Girl/Boy Child (PISGBC)	Vocational skills training
	Presidential Industrial Hubs	Youth skilling and enterprise creation
	Operation Wealth Creation (OWC)*	Agricultural production and input distribution
	Presidential Initiative on Science and Technology	Innovation support and research
	Presidential Advisory Committee on Exports and Industrial Development (PACEID)	Export promotion
	Presidential Zonal Industrial Hubs	Regional youth skilling
Protocol, Administration & Services	State House Comptroller	Manages State House finances and logistics
	State House Health Monitoring Unit	Oversees health service delivery complaints
	Presidential Press Unit (PPU)	Media and communication for the President
	Presidential Awards Committee (Chancellery of Honours)	National medals and awards
	Uganda Aids Commission*	National HIV/AIDS coordination (reports to President)

== Structure and leadership ==
The Minister for the Presidency currently Milly Babirye Babalanda serves as executive head of the Presidency and works alongside ministers responsible for portfolios that are administratively under or closely linked to the Office. These include Security, Science, Technology and Innovation, Kampala Capital City and Metropolitan Affairs, Economic Monitoring, Ethics and Integrity, and the Office of the Vice President.

The Cabinet Secretariat and other directorates provide policy support and coordination across Ministries, Departments, and Agencies. State House operates as the administrative and logistical arm that directly supports the President and the Vice President.

== Resident District and City Commissioners ==
There is a Resident District Commissioner for each district and a Resident City Commissioner for each city. Commissioners represent the President at the local level, monitor delivery of central and local government services, and chair district security committees. Parliament may assign additional functions by law.

== Location ==
Head offices are in Kampala. State House Entebbe is the principal official residence and office of the President.

== See also ==
- Constitution of Uganda
- Parliament of Uganda
- Office of the Auditor-General (Uganda)
