= Vietnam Union of Science and Technology Associations =

The Vietnam Union of Science and Technology Associations (VUSTA) is an umbrella organization of non-governmental or semi-autonomous organisations in Vietnam. It is a member of the Vietnam Fatherland Front, and member organisations remain connected to the government via the Union.

It was established according to Decision No. 121/HĐBT dated July 29, 1983 of the Council of Ministers (now the Government) of the Socialist Republic of Vietnam. At the beginning, it had 15 member associations. As of 2009, it comprised 79 central disciplined associations and 53 provincial unions of associations.

The member associations of VUSTA operate according to their own statutes and regulations with broad autonomous rights. They have to abide by VUSTA's main directives, under the guidance and control of VUSTA's Central Council. Its national representative congress is the supreme leading organ, with a term of office in 5 years. Up to 2009, VUSTA had recorded 5 national congresses.

The Union has membership in the International Science Council.

== Leaderships ==
- Professor, Major General Trần Đại Nghĩa was the first Chairman (1983 - 1988).
- Professor Dr. Hà Học Trạc was chairman in term II and term III (1988 - 1999).
- Professor Vũ Tuyên Hoàng was chairman in term IV (1999 - 2004) and term V (2004 - 2009).
- Associate Professor Dr. Hồ Uy Liêm was Acting Chairman in term V (2008 - 2010).
- The current chairman is Professor Dr. Đặng Vũ Minh (since 2010).
