= Walter Hackman =

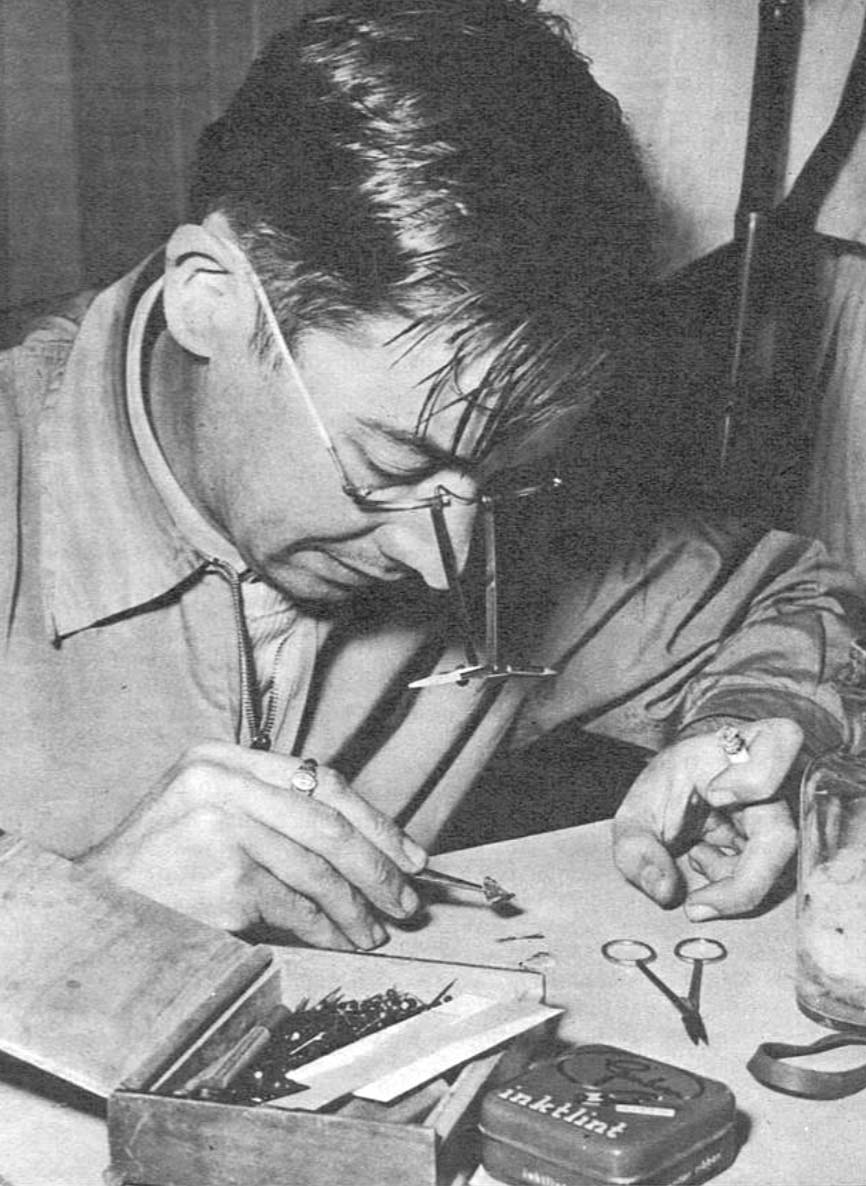

Walter Hackman (10 October 1916 – 8 March 2001) was a Finnish entomologist who specialized in the Lepidoptera and Diptera. He also studied spiders during a part of his career. He was a professor of zoology at the University of Helsinki.

Hackman was born in Helsinki and went to school in Läroverket för gossar och flickor where he was influenced by the biology teacher Rolf Krogerus who was also an entomologist. At school he took an interest in the lepidoptera and he joined the University of Helsinki in 1934 to study zoology and botany. He received his master's degree in zoology in 1940 and was conscripted into World War II. He served on the Maanselkä front and collected insects in Russian Karelia. After he was demobilized, he joined the zoology museum and also taught at a school. He became acting curator in 1954 and headed the entomology section from 1957. He worked on his doctoral dissertation on the cytology of spiders and received a doctorate in 1948 after which he became a lecturer at the University of Helsinki in 1950. he became a professor of zoology in 1972. Hackman studied the family Coleophoridae and also took an interest in the spiders. Of the flies he studied the families Drosophilidae, Scatophagidae, Sphaeroceridae and Hippoboscidae of Finland. He took a special interest in fungi-feeding flies as well as the arthropods living vole burrows.

Hackman was a member of the Societas pro Fauna et Flora Fennica in 1934 and became a board member in 1965. He was also a member of the Societas Entomologica Helsingforsiensis from 1934, becoming secretary in 1955. He edited its journal “Notulae Entomologicae” from 1945 to 1976 serving as a chief editor from 1948 to 1961. He was elected to the Societas Scientiarum Fenniae in 1955.
