= Ministry of Science, Technology and Innovation (Uganda) =

Government ministry of Uganda

Coordinates: 00°21′13.5″N 32°36′44.5″E

- Coat of Arms of Uganda

Ministry overview
- Formed: June 6, 2016
- Type: Ministry
- Jurisdiction: Government of Uganda
- Headquarters: Science and Technology House; Kimera Road, Ntinda; Kampala, Uganda
- Ministry executive: Monica Musenero Masanza, Minister of Science, Technology and Innovation
- Website: Homepage

The Ministry of Science, Technology and Innovation (MSTI), is a cabinet-level government ministry of Uganda. It is responsible for the planning, coordinating and implement government efforts to encourage scientific and technological innovation in educational institutions, industry, agriculture, commerce and daily life, on the country's path to middle-income status.

The ministry is headed by Minister of Science, Technology and Innovation, Monica Musenero Masanza.

== Location ==
The headquarters of the ministry are located at Rumee Building, on Lumumba Avenue, in the Central Division of Kampala, Uganda's capital and largest city.

== Affiliated agencies ==
- Uganda National Council for Science and Technology
- National Agricultural Research Organisation
- National Crops Resources Research Institute
- Uganda National Bureau of Standards
- Uganda Virus Research Institute
- Kiira Motors Corporation
- Makerere University
- Uganda National Health Research Organization
- Uganda Industrial Research Institute

Joint Clinical Research Centre Natural Chemotherapeutic research Institute

== See also ==
- Politics of Uganda
- Cabinet of Uganda
- Parliament of Uganda
