= Telomerina =

Scientific classification
- Kingdom: Animalia
- Phylum: Arthropoda
- Class: Insecta
- Order: Diptera
- Family: Sphaeroceridae
- Subfamily: Limosininae
- Genus: Telomerina; Roháček, 1983

Type species
- Borborus flavipes Meigen, 1830

Synonyms
- Telomerina Roháček, 1982

Genus of flies

Telomerina is a genus of flies belonging to the family Sphaeroceridae.

== Species ==
- T. beringiensis Marshall, 1987
- T. cana Marshall & Roháček, 1984
- T. cellularis (Spuler, 1925)
- T. chillcotti Marshall & Roháček, 1984
- T. eburnea Roháček, 1983
- T. flavipes (Meigen, 1830)
- T. kaszabi (Papp, 1973)
- T. lanceola Roháček, 1990
- T. levifrons (Spuler, 1925)
- T. orpha Marshall & Roháček, 1984
- T. paraflavipes (Papp, 1973)
- T. pengellyi Marshall & Roháček, 1984
- T. pseudoleucoptera (Duda, 1924)
- T. submerda Marshall & Roháček, 1984
- T. ursina Roháček, 1983
