= Telomerina orpha =

Scientific classification
- Domain: Eukaryota
- Kingdom: Animalia
- Phylum: Arthropoda
- Class: Insecta
- Order: Diptera
- Family: Sphaeroceridae
- Genus: Telomerina
- Species: T. orpha

Binomial name
- Telomerina orpha Marshall & Rohacek, 1984

Species of fly

Telomerina orpha is a species of lesser dung fly in the family Sphaeroceridae.
