= Telomerina flavipes =

Scientific classification
- Kingdom: Animalia
- Phylum: Arthropoda
- Class: Insecta
- Order: Diptera
- Family: Sphaeroceridae
- Genus: Telomerina
- Species: T. flavipes

Binomial name
- Telomerina flavipes (Meigen, 1830)

Synonyms
- Borborus flavipes Meigen, 1830; Leptocera gracilipennis Spuler, 1925

Species of fly

Telomerina flavipes is a species of lesser dung fly in the family Sphaeroceridae. It is found in Europe.
