= Homalomitrinae =

Scientific classification
- Kingdom: Animalia
- Phylum: Arthropoda
- Clade: Pancrustacea
- Class: Insecta
- Order: Diptera
- Family: Sphaeroceridae
- Subfamily: Homalomitrinae; Roháček & Marshall, 1998

Type genus
- Homalomitra Borgmeier, 1931

Subfamily of flies

Homalomitrinae is a subfamily of flies belonging to the family Sphaeroceridae.

== Genera ==
- Homalomitra Borgmeier, 1931
- Sphaeromitra Roháček & Marshall, 1998
- Podiomitra Marshall & Roháček, 2003
