= Homalomitra =

Scientific classification
- Kingdom: Animalia
- Phylum: Arthropoda
- Clade: Pancrustacea
- Class: Insecta
- Order: Diptera
- Family: Sphaeroceridae
- Subfamily: Homalomitrinae
- Genus: Homalomitra; Borgmeier, 1931

Type species
- Homalomitra ecitonis Borgmeier, 1931

Genus of flies

Homalomitra is a genus of flies belonging to the family Sphaeroceridae.

== Species ==
- Homalomitra albuquerquei Mourgués-Schurter, 1987
- Homalomitra antiqua Roháček & Marshall, 1998
- Homalomitra ecitonis Borgmeier, 1931
- Homalomitra tenuior Roháček & Marshall, 1998
