= Sphaeromitra =

Scientific classification
- Kingdom: Animalia
- Phylum: Arthropoda
- Class: Insecta
- Order: Diptera
- Family: Sphaeroceridae
- Subfamily: Homalomitrinae
- Genus: Sphaeromitra; Roháček & Marshall, 1998

Type species
- Sphaeromitra inepta Roháček & Marshall, 1998

Genus of flies

Sphaeromitra is a genus of flies belonging to the family Sphaeroceridae.

== Species ==
- Sphaeromitra inepta Roháček & Marshall, 1998
