= Bitheca boleta =

Scientific classification
- Domain: Eukaryota
- Kingdom: Animalia
- Phylum: Arthropoda
- Class: Insecta
- Order: Diptera
- Family: Sphaeroceridae
- Genus: Bitheca
- Species: B. boleta

Binomial name
- Bitheca boleta Marshall, 1987

Species of fly

Bitheca boleta is a species of lesser dung fly in the family Sphaeroceridae.
