= Bitheca =

Scientific classification
- Kingdom: Animalia
- Phylum: Arthropoda
- Class: Insecta
- Order: Diptera
- Family: Sphaeroceridae
- Subfamily: Limosininae
- Genus: Bitheca; Marshall, 1987

Type species
- Bitheca agarica Marshall, 1987

Genus of flies

Bitheca is a genus of flies belonging to the family Sphaeroceridae.

== Species ==
- B. agarica Marshall, 1987
- B. boleta Marshall, 1987
- B. caballa Marshall, 1987
- B. dispar Marshall, 1987
- B. ejuncida Marshall, 1987
- B. fundata Marshall, 1987
- B. grossa Marshall, 1987
- B. horrida Marshall, 1987
- B. involuta Marshall, 1987
- B. jubilata Marshall, 1987
- B. kappa Marshall, 1987
- B. lambda Marshall, 1987
- B. masoni (Marshall, 1985)
- B. steyskali (Deeming, 1980)
- B. xanthocephala (Spuler, 1925)
