= Tucminae =

Scientific classification
- Kingdom: Animalia
- Phylum: Arthropoda
- Class: Insecta
- Order: Diptera
- Family: Sphaeroceridae
- Subfamily: Tucminae; Marshall, 1996

Type genus
- Tucma Mourguès-Schurter, 1987

Subfamily of flies

Tucminae is a subfamily of flies belonging to the family Sphaeroceridae from Argentina.

== Genera ==
- Tucma Mourguès-Schurter, 1987
