= Tucma (fly) =

Scientific classification
- Kingdom: Animalia
- Phylum: Arthropoda
- Class: Insecta
- Order: Diptera
- Family: Sphaeroceridae
- Subfamily: Tucminae
- Genus: Tucma; Mourguès-Schurter, 1987

Type species
- Tucma tucumana Mourguès-Schurter, 1987

Genus of flies

Tucma is a genus of flies belonging to the family Sphaeroceridae from Argentina.

== Species ==
- Tucma fritzi Marshall, 1996
- Tucma tucumana Mourguès-Schurter, 1987
