= List of soldierflies and allies of Great Britain =

The following is a list of the larger Brachycera recorded in Britain, this includes the soldierflies and their allies.

== Family Xylophagidae ==
- Xylophagus ater - common awl-fly
- Xylophagus cinctus - red-belted awl-fly
- Xylophagus junki - Glenmore awl-fly

== Family Athericidae ==
- Atherix ibis - yellow-legged water-snipefly
- Atherix marginata - black-legged water-snipefly
- Atrichops crassipes - least water-snipefly

== Family Rhagionidae ==
- Chrysopilus asiliformis - little snipefly
- Chrysopilus cristatus - black snipefly
- Chrysopilus erythrophthalmus - silver-banded snipefly
- Chrysopilus laetus - tree snipefly
- Ptiolina nigra - pale-fringed moss-snipefly Synonym of Ptiolina obscura (Fallén, 1814)
- Ptiolina obscura - black-fringe moss-snipefly
- Rhagio annulatus - wood snipefly
- Rhagio lineola - small fleck-winged snipefly
- Rhagio notatus - large fleck-winged snipefly
- Rhagio scolopaceus - downlooker snipefly
- Rhagio strigosus - yellow downlooker snipefly
- Rhagio tringarius - marsh snipefly
- Spania nigra - liverwort snipefly
- Symphoromyia crassicornis - moorland snipefly
- Symphoromyia immaculata - limestone snipefly

== Family Tabanidae ==
=== Subfamily Chrysopsinae ===
- Chrysops caecutiens - splayed deerfly
- Chrysops relictus - twin-lobed deerfly
- Chrysops sepulcralis - black deerfly
- Chrysops viduatus - square-spot deerfly

=== Subfamily Tabaninae ===
- Haematopota bigoti - big-spotted cleg
- Haematopota crassicornis - black-horned cleg
- Haematopota grandis - long-horned cleg
- Haematopota pluvialis - horse fly, cleg fly or cleg, sometimes notch-horned cleg
- Haematopota subcylindrica - Levels cleg
- Atylotus fulvus - golden horsefly
- Atylotus latistriatus - saltmarsh horsefly
- Atylotus plebeius - Cheshire horsefly
- Atylotus rusticus - four-lined horsefly
- Hybomitra bimaculata - hairy-legged horsefly
- Hybomitra ciureai - Levels yellow-horned horsefly
- Hybomitra distinguenda - bright horsefly
- Hybomitra expollicata - striped horsefly
- Hybomitra lurida - broad-headed horsefly
- Hybomitra micans - black-legged horsefly
- Hybomitra montana - slender-horned horsefly
- Hybomitra muehlfeldi - broadland horsefly
- Hybomitra solstitialis - scarce forest horsefly
- Tabanus autumnalis - large marsh horsefly
- Tabanus bovinus - pale giant horsefly
- Tabanus bromius - band-eyed brown horsefly
- Tabanus cordiger - plain-eyed grey horsefly
- Tabanus glaucopsis - downland horsefly
- Tabanus maculicornis - narrow-winged horsefly
- Tabanus miki - plain-eyed brown horsefly
- Tabanus sudeticus - dark giant horsefly

== Family Xylomyidae ==
- Solva marginata - drab wood-soldierfly
- Solva varia (Meigen, 1820)
- Xylomya maculata - wasp wood-soldierfly

== Family Stratiomyidae ==
=== Subfamily Beridinae ===
- Beris chalybata - murky-legged black legionnaire
- Beris clavipes - scarce orange legionnaire
- Beris fuscipes - short-horned black legionnaire
- Beris geniculata - long-horned black legionnaire
- Beris morrisii - yellow-legged black legionnaire
- Beris vallata - common orange legionnaire
- Chorisops nagatomii - bright four-spined legionnaire
- Chorisops tibialis - dull four-spined legionnaire

=== Subfamily Clitellariinae ===
- Clitellaria ephippium

=== Subfamily Nemotelinae ===
- Nemotelus nigrinus - all-black snout
- Nemotelus notatus - flecked snout
- Nemotelus pantherinus - fen snout
- Nemotelus uliginosus - barred snout

=== Subfamily Pachygastrinae ===
- Eupachygaster tarsalis - sarce black
- Neopachygaster meromelaena - silver-strips black
- Pachygaster atra - dark-winged black
- Pachygaster leachii - yellow-legged black
- Zabrachia tenella - pine black

=== Subfamily Sarginae ===
- Chloromyia formosa - broad centurion
- Microchrysa cyaneiventris - black gem
- Microchrysa flavicornis - green gem
- Microchrysa polita - black-horned gem
- Sargus bipunctatus - twin-spot centurion
- Sargus cuprarius - clouded centurion
- Sargus flavipes - yellow-legged centurion
- Sargus iridatus - iridescent centurion

=== Subfamily Stratiomyinae ===
==== Tribe Oxycerini ====
- Oxycera analis - dark-winged soldier
- Oxycera dives - round-spotted major
- Oxycera fallenii - Irish major
- Oxycera leonina - twin-spotted major
- Oxycera morrisii - white-barred soldier
- Oxycera nigricornis - delicate soldier
- Oxycera pardalina - hill soldier
- Oxycera pygmaea - pygmy soldier
- Oxycera rara - four-barred major
- Oxycera terminata - yellow-tipped soldier
- Oxycera trilineata - three-lined soldier
- Vanoyia tenuicornis - long-horned soldier

==== Tribe Stratiomyini ====
- Odontomyia angulata - orange-horned green colonel
- Odontomyia argentata - silver colonel
- Odontomyia hydroleon - barred green colonel
- Odontomyia ornata - ornate brigadier
- Odontomyia tigrina - black colonel
- Oplodontha viridula - common green colonel
- Stratiomys chamaeleon - clubbed general
- Stratiomys longicornis - long-horned general
- Stratiomys potamida - banded general
- Stratiomys singularior - flecked general

== Family Acroceridae ==
- Ogcodes gibbosus - smart-banded hunchback
- Ogcodes pallipes - black-rimmed hunchback
- Paracrocera orbiculus - top-horned hunchback

== Family Bombyliidae ==
=== Subfamily Bombyliinae ===
- Bombylius canescens - western bee-fly
- Bombylius discolor - dotted bee-fly
- Bombylius major - dark-edged bee-fly
- Bombylius minor - heath bee-fly

=== Subfamily Exoprosopinae ===
- Thyridanthrax fenestratus - mottled bee-fly
- Villa cingulata - downland villa
- Villa modesta - dune villa
- Villa venusta - heath villa

=== Subfamily Phthiriinae ===
- Phthiria pulicaria - flea bee-fly

== Family Therevidae ==
- Acrosathe annulata - coastal silver-stiletto
- Cliorismia rustica - southern silver-stiletto
- Dialineura anilis - swollen silver-stiletto
- Pandivirilia melaleuca - forest silver-stiletto
- Spiriverpa lunulata - northern silver-stiletto
- Thereva cinifera - large plain stiletto
- Thereva fulva - small plain stiletto
- Thereva handlirschi - golden Scottish stiletto
- Thereva inornata - light Scottish stiletto
- Thereva nobilitata - common stiletto
- Thereva plebeja - crochet-hooked stiletto
- Thereva strigata - cliff stiletto
- Thereva unica - twin-spot stiletto synonym bipunctata
- Thereva valida - dark northern stiletto

== Family Scenopinidae ==
- Scenopinus fenestralis - house windowfly
- Scenopinus niger - forest windowfly

== Family Asilidae ==
=== Subfamily Asilinae ===
- Asilus crabroniformis - hornet robberfly
- Dysmachus trigonus - fan-bristled robberfly
- Eutolmus rufibarbis - golden-tabbed robberfly
- Machimus arthriticus - breck robberfly
- Machimus atricapillus - kite-tailed robberfly
- Machimus cingulatus - brown heath robberfly
- Machimus cowini - Manx robber fly
- Machimus rusticus - downland robberfly
- Neoitamus cothurnatus - scarce awl robberfly
- Neoitamus cyanurus - common awl robberfly
- Neomochtherus pallipes - Devon red-legged robberfly
- Pamponerus germanicus - pied-winged robberfly
- Philonicus albiceps - dune robberfly
- Rhadiurgus variabilis - northern robberfly

=== Subfamily Dasypogoninae ===
- Leptarthrus brevirostris - slender-footed robberfly
- Leptarthrus vitripennis - false slender-footed robberfly

=== Subfamily Laphriinae ===
- Choerades gilvus - ginger robberfly
- Choerades marginata - golden-haired robberfly
- Laphria flava - bumblebee robberfly

=== Subfamily Leptogastrinae ===
- Leptogaster cylindrica - striped slender robberfly
- Leptogaster guttiventris - dashed slender robberfly

=== Subfamily Stenopogoninae ===
- Dioctria atricapilla - violet black-legged robberfly
- Dioctria baumhaueri - stripe-legged robberfly
- Dioctria cothurnata - scarce red-legged robberfly
- Dioctria linearis - small yellow-legged robberfly
- Dioctria oelandica - orange-legged robberfly
- Dioctria rufipes - common red-legged robberfly
- Lasiopogon cinctus - spring heath robberfly
