= List of Diptera of Ireland Superfamilies Xylophagoidea, Tabanoidea, Stratiomyoidea, Nemestrinoidea, Asiloidea =

List of Diptera of Ireland Superfamilies Xylophagoidea, Tabanoidea, Stratiomyoidea, Nemestrinoidea, Asiloidea Part of List of Diptera of Ireland

== Superfamily Xylophagoidea ==
=== Xylophagidae ===
- Xylophagus ater Meigen 1804

== Superfamily Tabanoidea ==
=== Athericidae ===
- Atherix ibis (Fabricus 1798)
- Atherix marginata (Fabricius 1781)

=== Rhagionidae ===
- Chrysopilus asiliformis (Preyssler 1791)
- Chrysopilus cristatus (Fabricius 1775)
- Rhagio lineola Fabricius 1794
- Rhagio scolopaceus (Linnaeus 1758)
- Rhagio tringarius (Linnaeus 1758)

=== Spaniidae ===
- Symphoromyia crassicornis (Panzer 1806)
- Ptiolina obscura (Fallén, 1814)
- Spania nigra Meigen, 1830

=== Tabanidae ===
- Atylotus fulvus (Meigen 1804)
- Chrysops caecutiens (Linnaeus 1758)
- Chrysops relictus Meigen 1820
- Chrysops sepulcralis (Fabricius 1794)
- Chrysops viduatus (Fabricius 1794)
- Haematopota crassicornis Wahlberg 1848
- Haematopota pluvialis (Linnaeus 1758)
- Hybomitra montana (Meigen 1820)
- Hybomitra muehlfeldi (Brauer 1880)
- Tabanus bromius Linnaeus 1758
- Tabanus sudeticus Zeller 1842

== Superfamily Stratiomyoidea ==
=== Stratiomyidae ===
- Beris chalybata (Forster 1771)
- Beris clavipes (Linnaeus 1767)
- Beris fuscipes Meigen 1820
- Beris geniculata Curtis 1830
- Beris morrisii Dale 1841
- Beris vallata (Forster 1771)
- Chloromyia formosa (Scopoli 1763)
- Chorisops nagatomii Rozkosny 1979
- Chorisops tibialis (Meigen 1820)
- Microchrysa cyaneiventris (Zetterstedt 1842)
- Microchrysa flavicornis (Meigen 1822)
- Microchrysa polita (Linnaeus 1758)
- Nemotelus nigrinus Fallen 1817
- Nemotelus notatus Zetterstedt 1842
- Nemotelus pantherinus (Linnaeus 1758)
- Nemotelus uliginosus (Linnaeus 1767)
- Oplodontha viridula (Fabricius 1775)
- Oxycera fallenii Staeger 1844
- Oxycera morrisii Curtis 1833
- Oxycera nigricornis Olivier 1812
- Oxycera pardalina Meigen 1822
- Oxycera pygmaea (Fallen 1817)
- Oxycera trilineata (Linnaeus 1767)
- Pachygaster atra (Panzer 1798)
- Pachygaster leachii Curtis 1824
- Sargus bipunctatus (Scopoli 1763)
- Sargus flavipes Meigen 1822
- Sargus iridatus (Scopoli 1763)
- Stratiomys singularior (Harris 1776)
- Vanoyia tenuicornis (Macquart 1834)
- Zabrachia tenella (Jaennicke 1866)

== Superfamily Nemestrinoidea ==
=== Acroceridae ===
- Acrocera orbiculus (Fabricius, 1787 )

== Superfamily Asiloidea ==
=== Bombyliidae ===
- Bombylius canescens Mikan 1796
- Bombylius major Linnaeus 1758
- Phthiria pulicaria (Mikan 1796)
- Villa modesta (Meigen 1820)

=== Therevidae ===
- Acrosathe annulata (Fabricius, 1805)
- Dialineura anilis (Linnaeus, 1761)
- Thereva nobilitata (Fabricius, 1775)

=== Scenopinidae ===
- Scenopinus fenestralis (Linnaeus, 1758 )
- Scenopinus niger (De Geer, 1776)

=== Asilidae ===
- Machimus cowini (Hobby, 1946)
- Neoitamus cyanurus (Loew, 1849)
- Philonicus albiceps (Meigen, 1820)
