= Herald Way Marsh =

Protected area in Coventry, England

Coordinates: 52.38881°N 1.44306°W

Herald Way marsh
- Site of Special Scientific Interest
- Location of Herald Way marsh.
- Area of search: West Midlands
- Grid reference: SP380769
- Interest: Biological
- Area: 10.6 ha (26 acres)
- Notification date: 1988
- Location map: English Nature

Herald Way Marsh (grid reference SP380769) is a 10.6 hectares (26 acres) biological site of Special Scientific Interest in Coventry in the West Midlands. The site was notified in 1988 under the Wildlife and Countryside Act 1981. It is also a Local Nature Reserve. This site is protected particularly because of the diversity of insect species present in the wetland habitats. This site is also known as Claybrookes Marsh.

== Biology ==
Insect species recorded at this site include a bug species from the genus Chorosoma. Fly species recorded at this site include Phaonia atriceps, Oxycera morrisii, Oxycera nigricornis and Vanoyia tenuicornis. Solitary bee species recorded at the site include Andrena tibialis from genus Andrena. Beetle species recorded at this site include Cryptocephalus aureolus. A crane fly species recorded at this site is Nephrotoma crocata.

Plant species in the wetland habitats within Herald Way Marsh SSSI include common reed, reedmace, and reed canary-grass. Orchid species here include common spotted orchid and southern marsh orchid.

== Geology ==
The site lies on glacial sands and gravels overlaid by coal spoil.

== Land ownership ==
All land within Herald Way Marsh SSSI is owned by the local authority. The site is managed by Warwickshire Wildlife Trust who refer to the site with the name: Claybrookes Marsh.

== See also ==
- List of Sites of Special Scientific Interest in the West Midlands
