= Oxycera lyrifera =

Scientific classification
- Kingdom: Animalia
- Phylum: Arthropoda
- Class: Insecta
- Order: Diptera
- Family: Stratiomyidae
- Subfamily: Stratiomyinae
- Tribe: Oxycerini
- Genus: Oxycera
- Species: O. lyrifera

Binomial name
- Oxycera lyrifera (Szilády, 1941)

Synonyms
- Vanoyea lyrifera Szilády, 1941; Vanoyea graeca Szilády, 1941

Species of fly

Oxycera lyrifera is a species of soldier fly in the family Stratiomyidae.

== Distribution ==
Greece.
