= Oxycera sibirica =

Scientific classification
- Kingdom: Animalia
- Phylum: Arthropoda
- Class: Insecta
- Order: Diptera
- Family: Stratiomyidae
- Subfamily: Stratiomyinae
- Tribe: Oxycerini
- Genus: Oxycera
- Species: O. sibirica

Binomial name
- Oxycera sibirica (Szilády, 1941)

Synonyms
- Hermione sibirica Szilády, 1941; Oxycera sibilica Nagatomi, 1977

Species of fly

Oxycera sibirica is a species of soldier fly in the family Stratiomyidae.

== Distribution ==
Russia.
