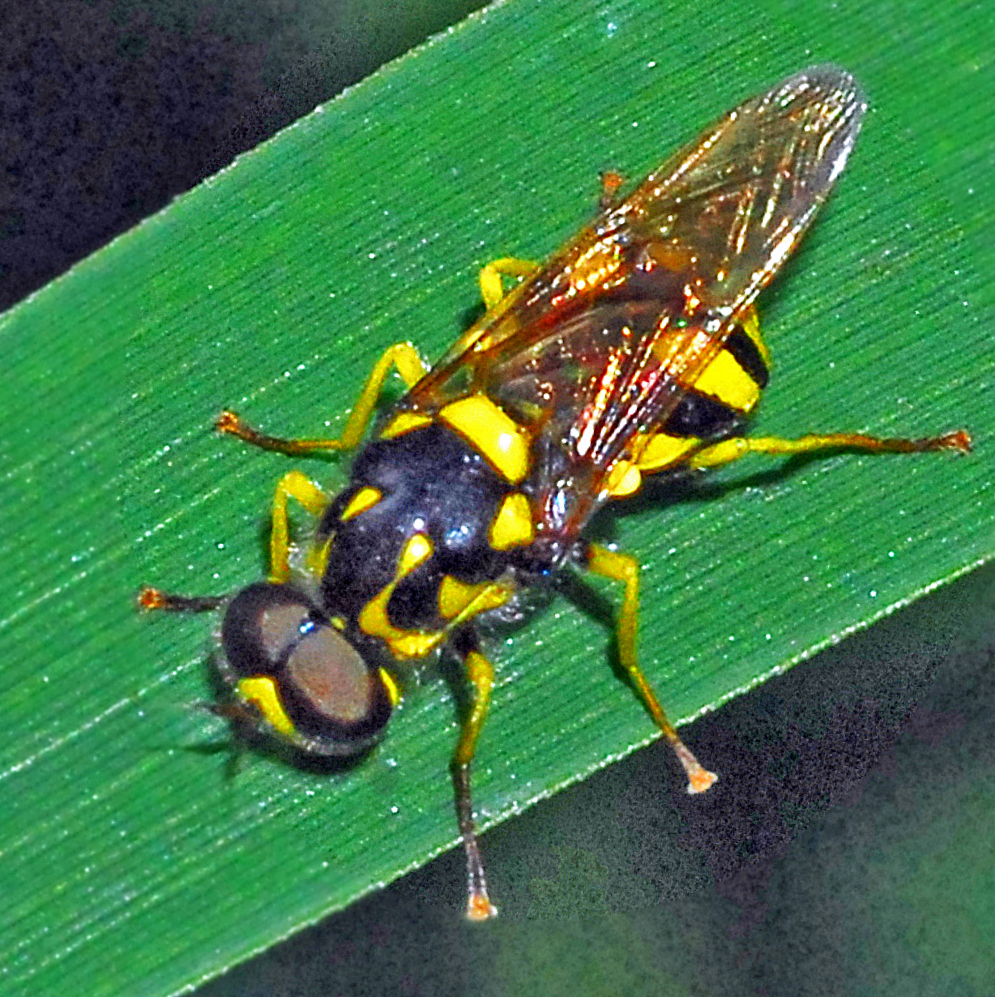
- Oxycera meigenii. Male

Scientific classification
- Kingdom: Animalia
- Phylum: Arthropoda
- Clade: Pancrustacea
- Class: Insecta
- Order: Diptera
- Family: Stratiomyidae
- Subfamily: Stratiomyinae
- Tribe: Oxycerini
- Genus: Oxycera
- Species: O. meigenii

Binomial name
- Oxycera meigenii Stæger, 1844

Synonyms
- Oxycera meigeni Zetterstedt, 1849; Oxycera fraterna Loew, 1873; Hermione caucasica Kertész, 1916; Hermione turkestanica Kertész, 1916; Hermione pallidipes Pleske, 1925; Hermione transcaspia Pleske, 1925

= Oxycera meigenii =

Species of fly

Oxycera meigenii is a species of soldier fly in the family Stratiomyidae.

== Distribution ==
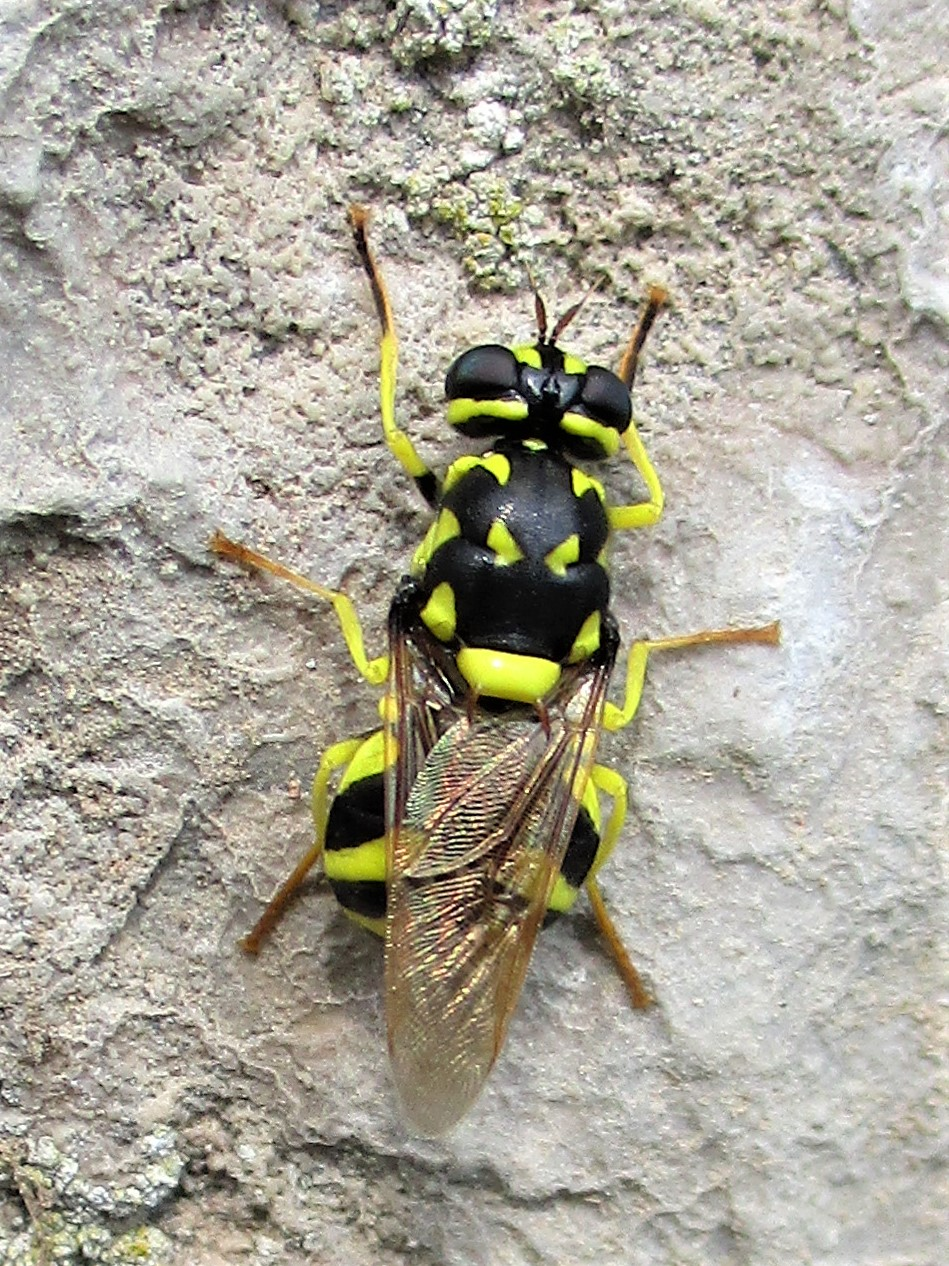
Oxycera meigenii. Female

This species is present in central and western parts of Europe (Austria. Belgium, Bosnia and Herzegovina, Bulgaria, Russia, Croatia, Czech Republic, Denmark, France, Germany, Greece, Hungary, Italy, Latvia, Lithuania, Moldova, Poland, Romania, Slovakia. Sweden. Switzerland and in Ukraine), in the Near East and in the East Palaearctic.

== Habitat ==
This species occurs in wetlands, lakes and streams and in agricultural areas.

== Description ==
Oxycera meigenii can reach a body length of about 7–9 mm (0.28–0.35 in).

These soldier flies have red antennae. On mesonotum of both sexes are present longitudinal yellow stripes, connected to humeral spots, in female abrupt at the middle. Scutellus is yellow with red tips. Also legs are yellow. Femora 1 and 2 in basal half and anterior tarsi are black. On the abdominal tergites 2–4 are present extensive oblique yellow lateral-markings and yellow apex.

== Biology ==
Adults of Oxycera meigenii can be found in July.

== Etymology ==
The name honours Johann Wilhelm Meigen.
