= Oxycera fenestrata =

Scientific classification
- Kingdom: Animalia
- Phylum: Arthropoda
- Class: Insecta
- Order: Diptera
- Family: Stratiomyidae
- Subfamily: Stratiomyinae
- Tribe: Oxycerini
- Genus: Oxycera
- Species: O. fenestrata

Binomial name
- Oxycera fenestrata (Kertész, 1914)

Synonyms
- Hermione fenestrata Kertész, 1914

Species of fly

Oxycera fenestrata is a species of soldier fly in the family Stratiomyidae.

== Distribution ==
Taiwan.
