= Oxycera apicalis =

Scientific classification
- Kingdom: Animalia
- Phylum: Arthropoda
- Class: Insecta
- Order: Diptera
- Family: Stratiomyidae
- Subfamily: Stratiomyinae
- Tribe: Oxycerini
- Genus: Oxycera
- Species: O. apicalis

Binomial name
- Oxycera apicalis (Kertész, 1914)

Synonyms
- Hermione apicalis Kertész, 1914

Species of fly

Oxycera apicalis is a species of soldier fly in the family Stratiomyidae.

== Distribution ==
Taiwan.
