= Oxycera variegata =

Scientific classification
- Kingdom: Animalia
- Phylum: Arthropoda
- Class: Insecta
- Order: Diptera
- Family: Stratiomyidae
- Subfamily: Stratiomyinae
- Tribe: Oxycerini
- Genus: Oxycera
- Species: O. variegata

Binomial name
- Oxycera variegata Olivier, 1811

Synonyms
- Oxycera unifasciata Loew, 1863

Species of fly

Oxycera variegata is a species of soldier fly in the family Stratiomyidae.

== Distribution ==
United States.
