= Oxycera albovittata =

Scientific classification
- Kingdom: Animalia
- Phylum: Arthropoda
- Class: Insecta
- Order: Diptera
- Family: Stratiomyidae
- Subfamily: Stratiomyinae
- Tribe: Oxycerini
- Genus: Oxycera
- Species: O. albovittata

Binomial name
- Oxycera albovittata Malloch, 1917

Species of fly

Oxycera albovittata is a species of soldier fly in the family Stratiomyidae.

== Distribution ==
Canada.
