= Oxycera excellens =

Scientific classification
- Kingdom: Animalia
- Phylum: Arthropoda
- Clade: Pancrustacea
- Class: Insecta
- Order: Diptera
- Family: Stratiomyidae
- Subfamily: Stratiomyinae
- Tribe: Oxycerini
- Genus: Oxycera
- Species: O. excellens

Binomial name
- Oxycera excellens (Kertész, 1914)

Synonyms
- Hermione excellens Kertész, 1914

Species of fly

Oxycera excellens is a species of soldier fly in the family Stratiomyidae.

== Distribution ==
Taiwan, China.

Shenzhen, China.

Dubai, United Arab Emirates
