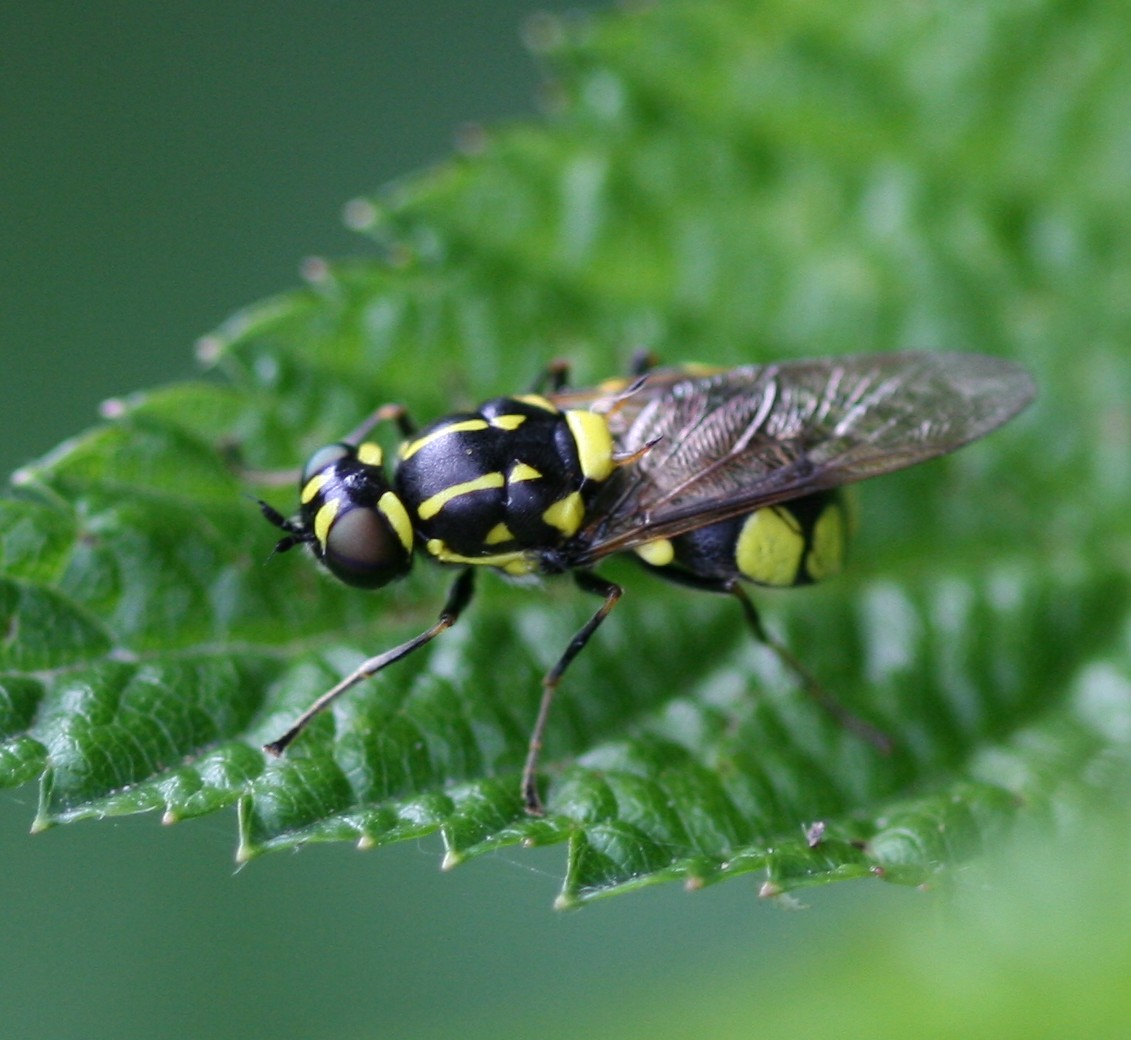
- Oxycera dives female

Scientific classification
- Kingdom: Animalia
- Phylum: Arthropoda
- Clade: Pancrustacea
- Class: Insecta
- Order: Diptera
- Family: Stratiomyidae
- Subfamily: Stratiomyinae
- Tribe: Oxycerini
- Genus: Oxycera; Meigen, 1803

Type species
- Musca trilineata Linnaeus, 1767

Synonyms
- Alphoxycera Pleske, 1925; Betoxycera Pleske, 1925; Epanastasis Kertész, 1923; Epanastatis Neave, 1939; Euoxycera Pleske, 1925; Harmione Rozkošný, 1983; Heraclina Lindner, 1938; Heteroxycera Bigot, 1856; Hypoleon Duméril, 1805; Macroxycera Pleske, 1925; Metoxycera Pleske, 1925; Microxycera Pleske, 1925; Oxicera Rondani, 1856; Paroxycera Pleske, 1925

= Oxycera =

Genus of flies

Oxycera is a genus of flies in the family Stratiomyidae.

== Species ==
- Oxycera abyssinica Bezzi, 1906
- Oxycera adusta (Lindner, 1968)
- Oxycera albomicans Brunetti, 1920
- Oxycera albovittata Malloch, 1917
- Oxycera aldrichi Malloch, 1917
- Oxycera analis Meigen & Wiedemann, 1822
- Oxycera apicalis (Kertész, 1914)
- Oxycera approximata Malloch, 1917
- Oxycera atra Loew, 1873
- Oxycera basalis Zhang, Li & Yang, 2009
- Oxycera binotata (Séguy, 1934)
- Oxycera centralis Loew, 1863
- Oxycera chikuni Yang & Nagatomi, 1993
- Oxycera confinis (Lindner, 1965)
- Oxycera contusa Cockerell, 1917
- Oxycera cuiae Wang, Li & Yang, 2010
- Oxycera daliensis Zhang, Li & Yang, 2010
- Oxycera dispar (Kertész, 1914)
- Oxycera dives Loew, 1845
- Oxycera excellens (Kertész, 1914)
- Oxycera fallenii Staeger, 1844
- Oxycera fasciventris Loew, 1873
- Oxycera fenestrata (Kertész, 1914)
- Oxycera flava (Lindner, 1938)
- Oxycera flavimaculata Li, Zhang & Yang, 2009
- Oxycera flavopilosa (Pleske, 1925)
- Oxycera fumipennis (Kertész, 1923)
- Oxycera galeata (Lindner, 1975)
- Oxycera germanica (Szilády, 1932)
- Oxycera grancanariensis Frey, 1936
- Oxycera grata Loew, 1869
- Oxycera guangxiensis Yang & Nagatomi, 1993
- Oxycera guizhouensis Yang, Wei & Yang, 2008
- Oxycera hirticeps Loew, 1873
- Oxycera hybrida Loew, 1873
- Oxycera insolata Kühbandner, 1984
- Oxycera japonica (Szilády, 1941)
- Oxycera kusigematti Nagatomi, 1977
- Oxycera laniger (Séguy, 1934)
- Oxycera latifrons (Lindner, 1965)
- Oxycera leonina (Panzer, 1798)
- Oxycera lii Yang & Nagatomi, 1993
- Oxycera limbata Loew, 1862
- Oxycera liui Li, Zhang & Yang, 2009
- Oxycera locuples Loew, 1857
- Oxycera lyrifera (Szilády, 1941)
- Oxycera madagassica (Lindner, 1966)
- Oxycera manens Walker, 1859
- Oxycera marginata Loew, 1859
- Oxycera meigenii Staeger, 1844
- Oxycera micronigra Yang, Wei & Yang, 2009
- Oxycera morrisii Curtis, 1833
- Oxycera muscaria (Fabricius, 1794)
- Oxycera nana Loew, 1873
- Oxycera nigricornis Olivier, 1811
- Oxycera nigrisincipitalis Woodley, 2001
- Oxycera nigriventris Loew, 1873
- Oxycera ningxiaensis Yang, Yu & Yang, 2012
- Oxycera notata Loew, 1873
- Oxycera ochracea (Vaillant, 1950)
- Oxycera orientalis (Lindner, 1974)
- Oxycera pardalina Meigen, 1822
- Oxycera picta Wulp, 1867
- Oxycera pseudoamoena Dušek & Rozkošný, 1974
- Oxycera pygmaea (Fallén, 1817)
- Oxycera qiana Yang, Wei & Yang, 2009
- Oxycera qinghensis Yang & Nagatomi, 1993
- Oxycera quadrilineata Ustuner & Hasbenli, 2007
- Oxycera quadripartita (Lindner, 1940)
- Oxycera rara (Scopoli, 1763)
- Oxycera rozkosnyi Yang, Yu & Yang, 2012
- Oxycera rufifrons Loew, 1873
- Oxycera semilimbata (Lindner, 1966)
- Oxycera sibirica (Szilády, 1941)
- Oxycera signata Brunetti, 1920
- Oxycera sinica (Pleske, 1925)
- Oxycera stigmosa (Kertész, 1916)
- Oxycera stuckenbergi (Lindner, 1961)
- Oxycera submaculata Nartshuk & Rozkošný, 1984
- Oxycera sumbana (Lindner, 1951)
- Oxycera tangi (Lindner, 1940)
- Oxycera tenebricosa (Vaillant, 1952)
- Oxycera tenuis (Lindner, 1965)
- Oxycera terminata Meigen & Wiedemann, 1822
- Oxycera tibialis Meijere, 1907
- Oxycera torrentium (Vaillant, 1950)
- Oxycera tricolor Loew, 1873
- Oxycera trilineata (Linnaeus, 1767)
- Oxycera trispila Bezzi, 1909
- Oxycera turcica Ustuner & Hasbenli, 2004
- Oxycera variegata Olivier, 1811
- Oxycera varipes Loew, 1870
- Oxycera vertipila Yang & Nagatomi, 1993
- Oxycera whitei Brunetti, 1923
- Oxycera zambesina (Lindner, 1961)
