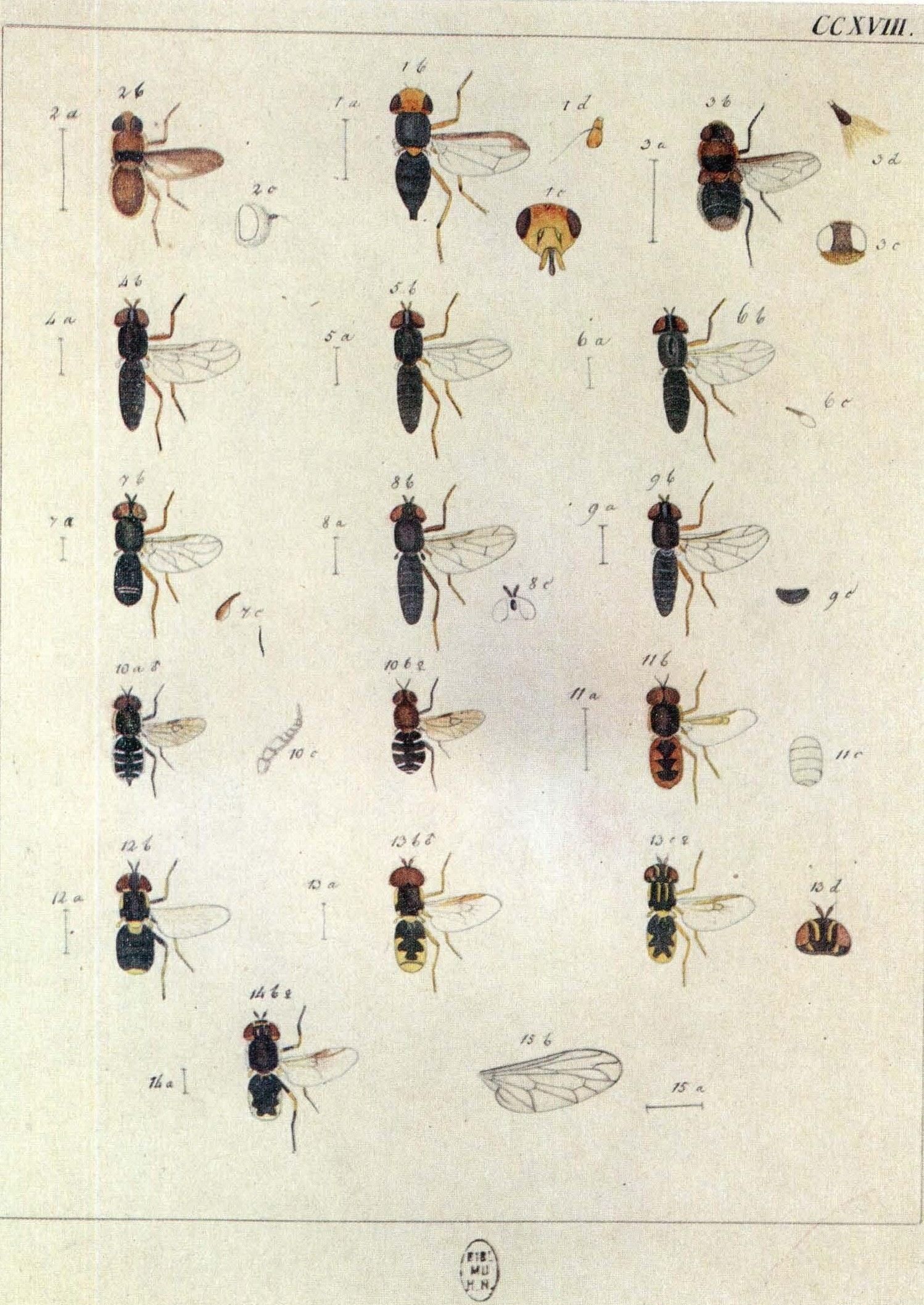
- Oxycera leonina

Scientific classification
- Kingdom: Animalia
- Phylum: Arthropoda
- Class: Insecta
- Order: Diptera
- Family: Stratiomyidae
- Subfamily: Stratiomyinae
- Tribe: Oxycerini
- Genus: Oxycera
- Species: O. leonina

Binomial name
- Oxycera leonina (Panzer, 1798)

Synonyms
- Stratiomys leonina Panzer, 1798; Hermione ruttneri f. ruttneri Lindner, 1943

= Oxycera leonina =

Species of fly

Oxycera leonina, the twin-spotted major, is a European species of soldier fly.

== Description ==
Adult body length 5.5 to 8 mm. Wing length 5.5 to 6 mm. In both male and female, the scutellum has two spines. The abdomen is nearly all black except for small bits of yellow at the tip and the base.

== Distribution ==
Austria, Belgium, Czech Republic, Denmark, England, France, Germany, Hungary, Italy, Netherlands, Poland, Romania, Russia, Slovakia, Spain, Switzerland, Ukraine, Yugoslavia.

More recently it has also been found in Turkey.
