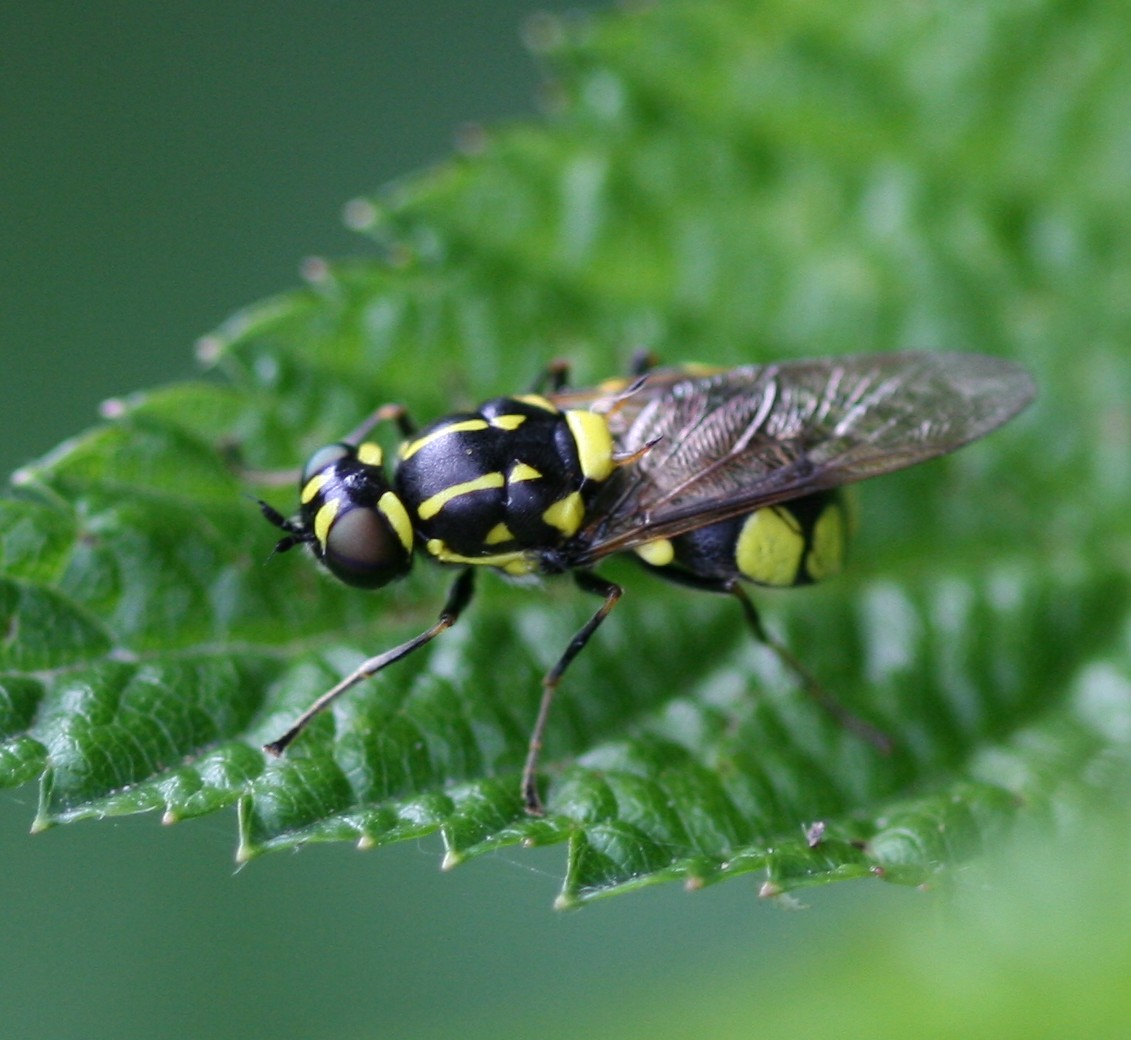
- Oxycera dives female

Scientific classification
- Kingdom: Animalia
- Phylum: Arthropoda
- Class: Insecta
- Order: Diptera
- Family: Stratiomyidae
- Subfamily: Stratiomyinae
- Tribe: Oxycerini
- Genus: Oxycera
- Species: O. dives

Binomial name
- Oxycera dives Loew, 1845

= Oxycera dives =

Species of fly

Oxycera dives, the round-spotted major, is a European species of soldier fly.

== Description ==
Adult body length 5.5 to 6.5 mm. Wing length 6 mm. Adults have almost completely black legs and a scutellum with two spines.

== Distribution ==
Austria, Czech Republic, England, Finland, France, Germany, Poland, Russia, Scotland, Slovakia, Switzerland.
