= Oxycerina =

Scientific classification
- Kingdom: Animalia
- Phylum: Arthropoda
- Class: Insecta
- Order: Diptera
- Family: Stratiomyidae
- Subfamily: Stratiomyinae
- Tribe: Oxycerini
- Genus: Oxycerina; Rozkošný & Woodley, 2010

Type species
- Oxycerina sabaha Rozkošný & Woodley, 2010

Genus of flies

Oxycerina is a genus of flies in the family Stratiomyidae.

== Species ==
- Oxycerina hauseri Rozkošný & Woodley, 2010
- Oxycerina merzi Rozkošný & Woodley, 2010
- Oxycerina sabaha Rozkošný & Woodley, 2010
