= Oxycera analis =

Scientific classification
- Kingdom: Animalia
- Phylum: Arthropoda
- Class: Insecta
- Order: Diptera
- Family: Stratiomyidae
- Subfamily: Stratiomyinae
- Tribe: Oxycerini
- Genus: Oxycera
- Species: O. analis

Binomial name
- Oxycera analis Wiedemann in Meigen, 1822

Species of fly

Oxycera analis, the dark-winged soldier, is a species of soldier fly.

== Distribution ==
This rather rare species can be found in most of Europe and in the Near East.

== Habitat ==
These soldier flies usually inhabit woodland springs, calcareous seepages, small streams and sometimes fens and marshes.

== Description ==
Oxycera analis can reach a length of 5.5–7 millimetres (0.22–0.28 in) and a wingspan of 5.9–6.6 millimetres (0.23–0.26 in). In males of these medium-small soldier flies the body is almost entirely black, but the scutellar tubercles can be yellowish. In any case in the females the apex of tergite 5 of the scutellum is yellowish. Moreover the scutellum has two spines. Also the abdomen is black with a single apical spot, rarely with yellow side-markings. Antennal apical consists of the two last flagellomeres. Wings show a distinct dark cloud in the otherwise clear wings.

== Biology ==
Adults of Oxycera analis can be found in Summer, with a peak in June and July. Larvae live in the sediments and mosses associated with wetlands.
