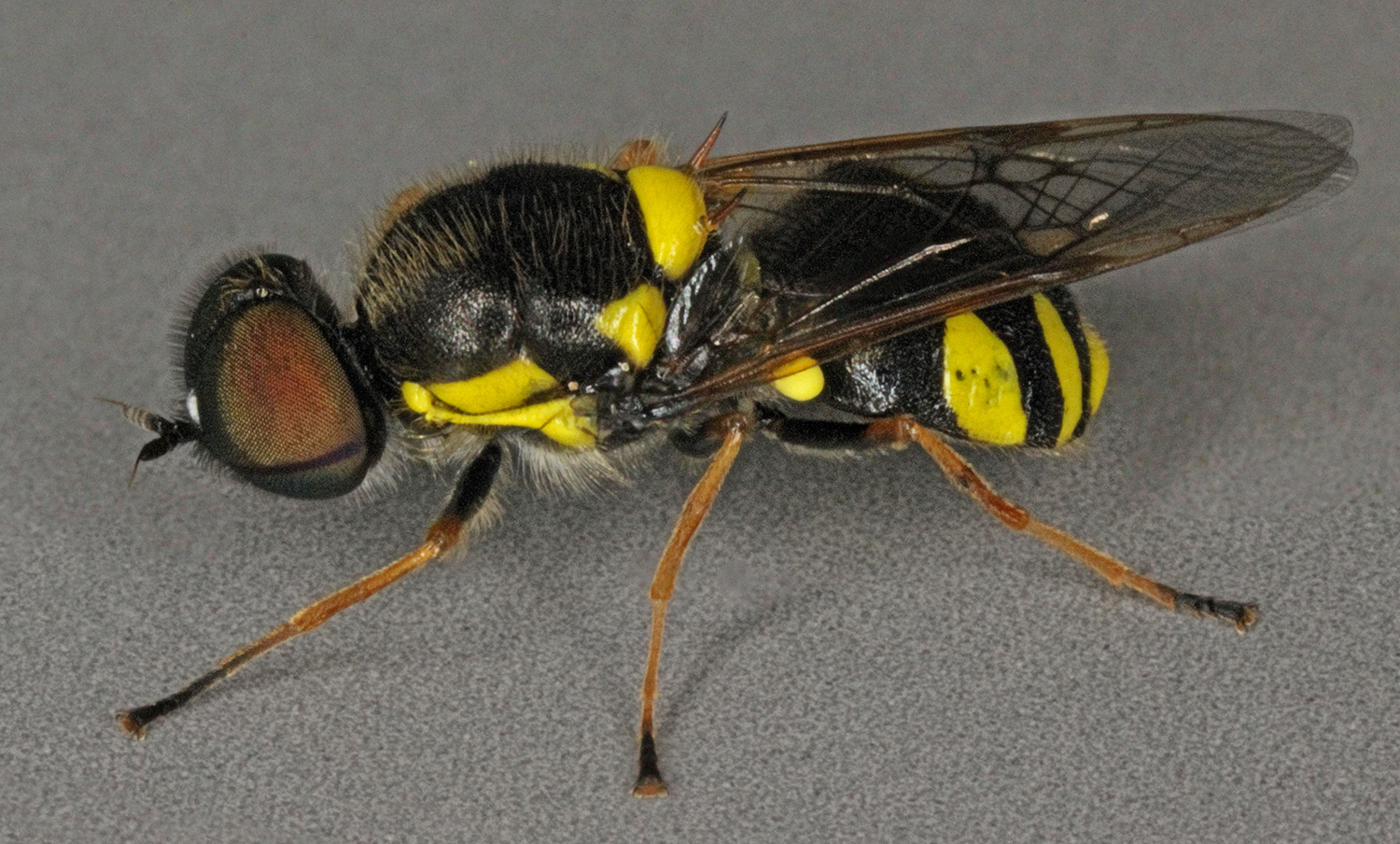
- specimen from North Wales

Scientific classification
- Kingdom: Animalia
- Phylum: Arthropoda
- Class: Insecta
- Order: Diptera
- Family: Stratiomyidae
- Subfamily: Stratiomyinae
- Tribe: Oxycerini
- Genus: Oxycera
- Species: O. rara

Binomial name
- Oxycera rara (Scopoli, 1763)

Synonyms
- Musca hypoleon Donovan, 1795; Musca rara Scopoli, 1763; Musca tardigradus Harris, 1776; Oxycera hypoleon (Donovan, 1795); Oxycera maculata (Geoffroy, 1785); Oxycera pulchella Meigen, 1822; Oxycera tardigradus (Harris, 1776); Stratiomys maculata Geoffroy, 1785; Hermione pulchella var. similis Vaillant, 1950

= Oxycera rara =

Species of fly

Oxycera rara, the four-barred major, is a European species of soldier fly.

== Description ==
Adult body length 7 mm. Wing length 6 mm. In both male and female, the scutellum has two spines. The most diagnostic character for this species is that tergite 2 is entirely black with no markings.

== Distribution ==
In the European continent: southern England, Wales, Italy, Andorra, Austria, Belgium, Czech Republic, France, Germany, Hungary, Netherlands, Poland, Romania, Slovakia, Slovenia, Spain, Switzerland, Yugoslavia. In the African continent: Tunisia and Algeria.
