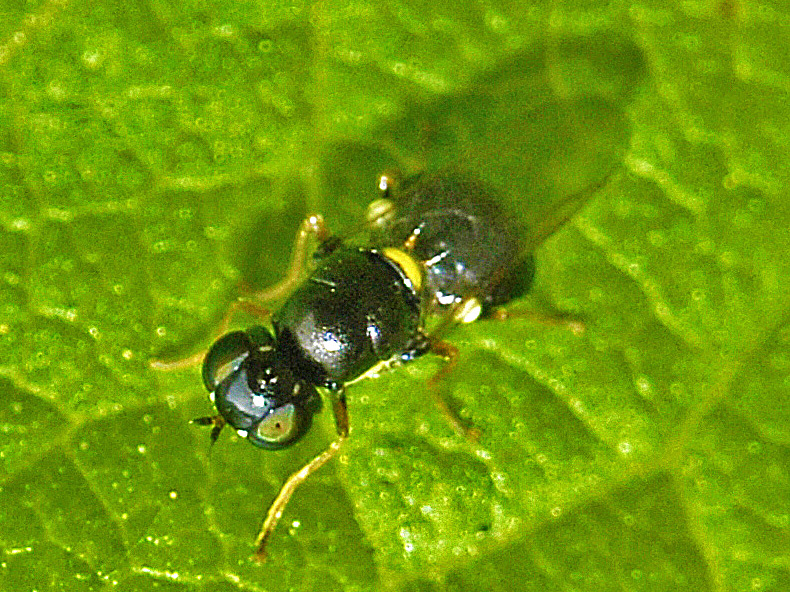
- Oxycera terminata (female)

Scientific classification
- Kingdom: Animalia
- Phylum: Arthropoda
- Clade: Pancrustacea
- Class: Insecta
- Order: Diptera
- Family: Stratiomyidae
- Subfamily: Stratiomyinae
- Tribe: Oxycerini
- Genus: Oxycera
- Species: O. terminata

Binomial name
- Oxycera terminata Wiedemann in Meigen, 1822

Synonyms
- Oxycera terminalis Dale, 1842

= Oxycera terminata =

Species of fly

Oxycera terminata, the yellow-tipped soldier, is a European species of soldier fly.

== Description ==
The abdomen is black, with only the tip yellow. There are no lateral yellow spots and the wings are not darkened in the median wing area.Vein R4+5 is forked.

== Distribution ==
Widespread N and C Europe.
