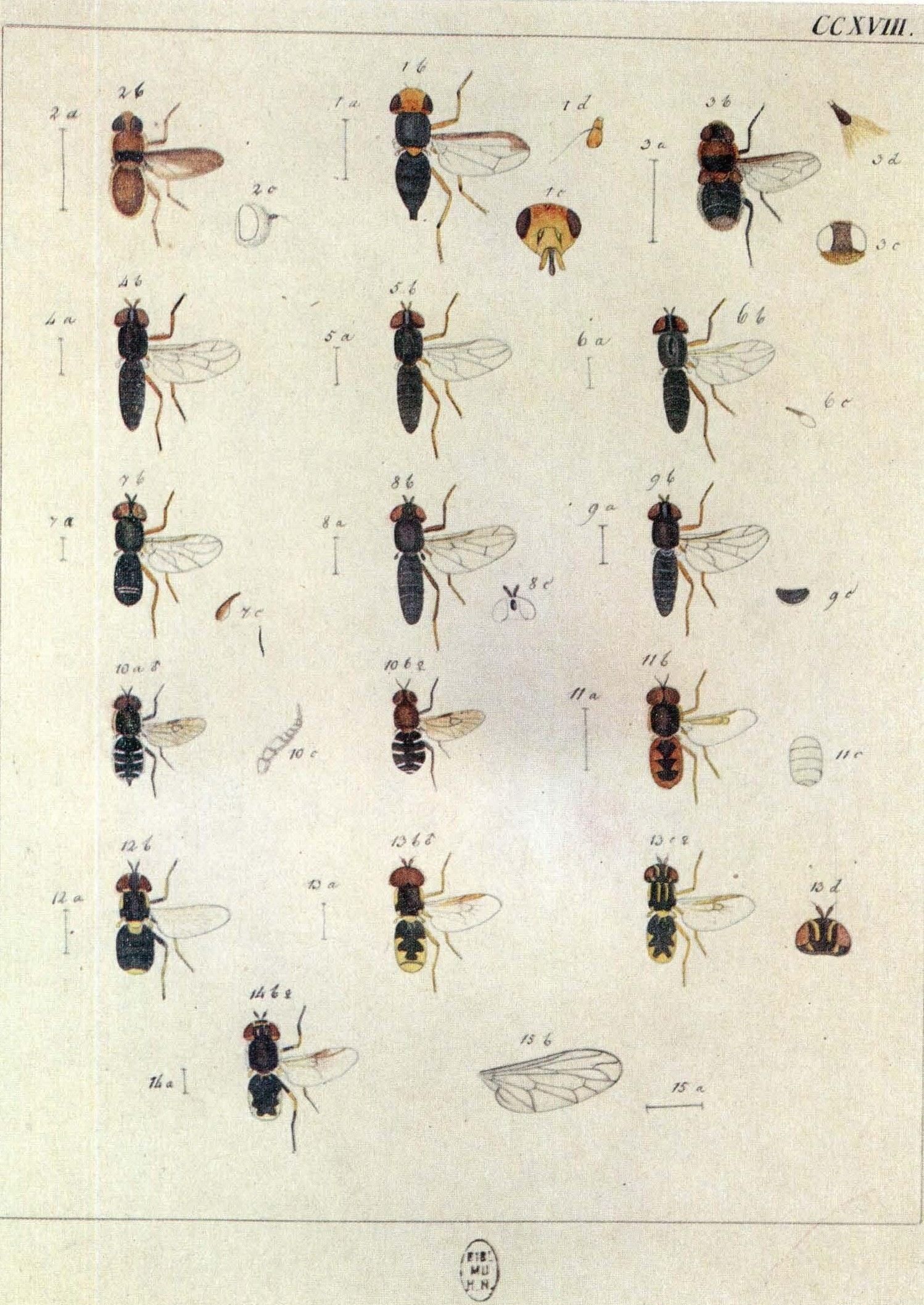
- Oxycera pardalina in the 1790 edition of Europäischen Zweiflügeligen (figure 13)

Scientific classification
- Kingdom: Animalia
- Phylum: Arthropoda
- Class: Insecta
- Order: Diptera
- Family: Stratiomyidae
- Subfamily: Stratiomyinae
- Tribe: Oxycerini
- Genus: Oxycera
- Species: O. pardalina

Binomial name
- Oxycera pardalina Meigen, 1822

Synonyms
- Oxycera amoena Loew, 1857; Oxycera engadinica Jaennicke, 1866; Oxycera calceata Loew, 1871; Hermione sahunica Séguy, 1934; Hermione pardalina var. oldenbergi Lindner, 1938; Hermione pardalina var. nigrifrons Szilády, 1941; Hermione morrisi var. bohemica Hrbácek, 1945; Hermione armata Vaillant, 1950

= Oxycera pardalina =

Species of fly

Oxycera pardalina, the hill soldier, is a European species of soldier fly.

== Description ==
Body length 4.0 to 5.0 mm. Black. Mesonotum only slightly glossy. Basal segments of antennae yellow, the third segment is dark brown. Scutellum with two black spots near base. Abdomen: second, third and fourth tergites with rounded side spots; Fourth tergite band complete or closely separated in the middle, fifth with a large rounded median spot. Female: yellow stripe on face along anterior margin of eyes continued onto frons.

== Biology ==
The habitat is hilly country, small calcareous streams in scrub or at a woodland edge. The flight period is from early June to early August,

== Distribution ==
Northern Central and Southern Europe.
