= Haematopota bigoti =

Scientific classification
- Kingdom: Animalia
- Phylum: Arthropoda
- Class: Insecta
- Order: Diptera
- Family: Tabanidae
- Subfamily: Tabaninae
- Tribe: Haematopotini
- Genus: Haematopota
- Species: H. bigoti

Binomial name
- Haematopota bigoti Gobert, 1880

Synonyms
- Haematopota monspellensis Villeneuve, 1921

Species of fly

Haematopota bigoti is a species of horse-fly.

== Distribution ==
It can be found in European countries as Austria, Croatia, Denmark, Hungary, Italy, Montenegro, Poland, Portugal, Romania, Slovakia, Spain, and the Netherlands. From 1992–1993 it was recorded in Croatia, where it was captured feeding on cows and horses.
