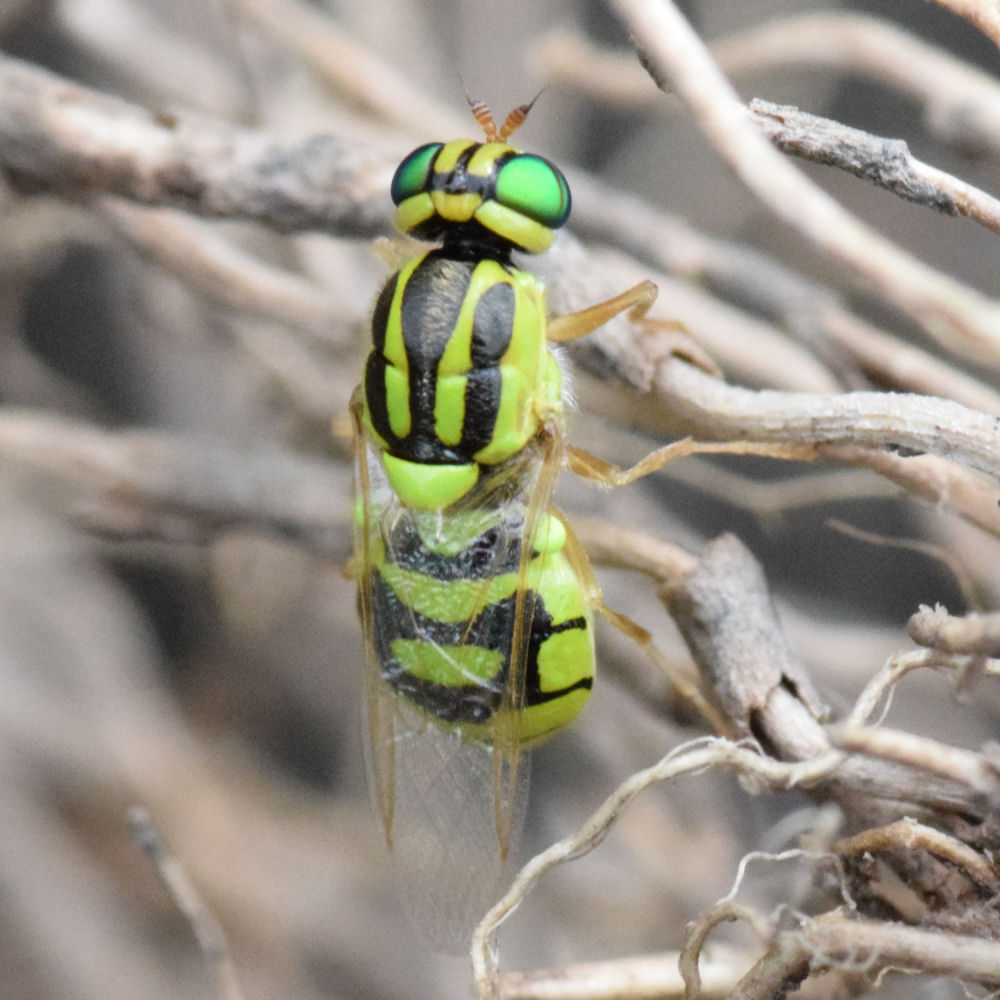

Scientific classification
- Kingdom: Animalia
- Phylum: Arthropoda
- Clade: Pancrustacea
- Class: Insecta
- Order: Diptera
- Family: Stratiomyidae
- Subfamily: Stratiomyinae
- Tribe: Oxycerini
- Genus: Oxycera
- Species: O. trilineata

Binomial name
- Oxycera trilineata (Linnaeus, 1767)

Synonyms
- Musca graeca Pontoppidan, 1763; Musca trilineata Linnaeus, 1767; Musca hypoleon Linnaeus, 1767; Stratiomys fasciata Geoffroy, 1785; Oxycera proxima Loew, 1873; Oxycera trilineata var. collaris Brunetti, 1889; Hermione trilineata ssp. transfasciata Pleske, 1925; Hermione trilineata ssp. ferghanensis Pleske, 1925; Hermione ucrainica Paramonov, 1926; Hermione bucheti Séguy, 1930; Hermione trilineata ssp. angustistomata Lindner, 1938; Odontomyia atrata Verrall, 1909

= Oxycera trilineata =

Species of fly

Oxycera trilineata, the three-lined soldier, is a Palearctic species of soldier fly. Boldly marked in yellowish-green and black. The notopleural spot is linked with postalar spot, to form a broad, continuous lateral margin. The mesonotum in both sexes with two broad stripes. It is found in a variety of wetlands, including pools, ditches, fens and swampy river margins. It is found in North European Russia up to Leningrad; Central Asia, Siberia. Western Europe, north up to southern Sweden.
