= Cliorismia rustica =

Scientific classification
- Kingdom: Animalia
- Phylum: Arthropoda
- Class: Insecta
- Order: Diptera
- Family: Therevidae
- Genus: Cliorismia
- Species: C. rustica

Binomial name
- Cliorismia rustica (Panzer, 1804)

Synonyms
- Bibio confinis Fallen, 1815

Species of fly

Cliorismia rustica is a Palearctic species of stiletto fly in the family Therevidae.
