= Oxycera fallenii =

Scientific classification
- Kingdom: Animalia
- Phylum: Arthropoda
- Class: Insecta
- Order: Diptera
- Family: Stratiomyidae
- Subfamily: Stratiomyinae
- Tribe: Oxycerini
- Genus: Oxycera
- Species: O. fallenii

Binomial name
- Oxycera fallenii Staeger, 1844

Synonyms
- Oxycera falleni Loew, 1845; Oxycera octomaculata Yaroshevskii, 1877; Oxycera falenii Dušek & Rozkošný, 1974

Species of fly

Oxycera fallenii, the Irish major, is a Palearctic species of soldier fly. The body length is 7.0 to 9.0.mm. The abdomen has three pairs of yellow spots, in addition to a yellow base and tip. Longitudinal stripes on the mesonotum are not connected with the yellow humeral spot. The legs are entirely yellow. This species is found in South European USSR East to Siberia and Western Europe to Ireland, Central Europe, South Europe and Turkey.
