= Tabanus miki =

Scientific classification
- Kingdom: Animalia
- Phylum: Arthropoda
- Clade: Pancrustacea
- Class: Insecta
- Order: Diptera
- Family: Tabanidae
- Subfamily: Tabaninae
- Tribe: Tabanini
- Genus: Tabanus
- Species: T. miki

Binomial name
- Tabanus miki Brauer, 1880

Synonyms
- Tabanus postvelutinus Moucha, 1962; Tabanus velutinus Kröber, 1936

Species of fly

Tabanus miki also known as the plain-eyed brown horsefly is a species of biting horse-fly.

== Description ==
A grey fly, with little lateral reddish colour. It has the following diagnostic characters.Head: Upper facets of eyes distinctly larger than lower facets, vertex with black hairs, third antenna! segment mostly black, reddish near base, , broader than first segment and mostly black, reddish near base. Abdomen:oblique lateral spots which are large and blurred and more conspicuous than the median triangles (may be reddish), scutellum with pale hairs.10-16 mm. It is similar to Tabanus bromius but the postocular rim is broader and the ocellar tubercle is smaller than in bromius.

== Distribution ==
Europe
