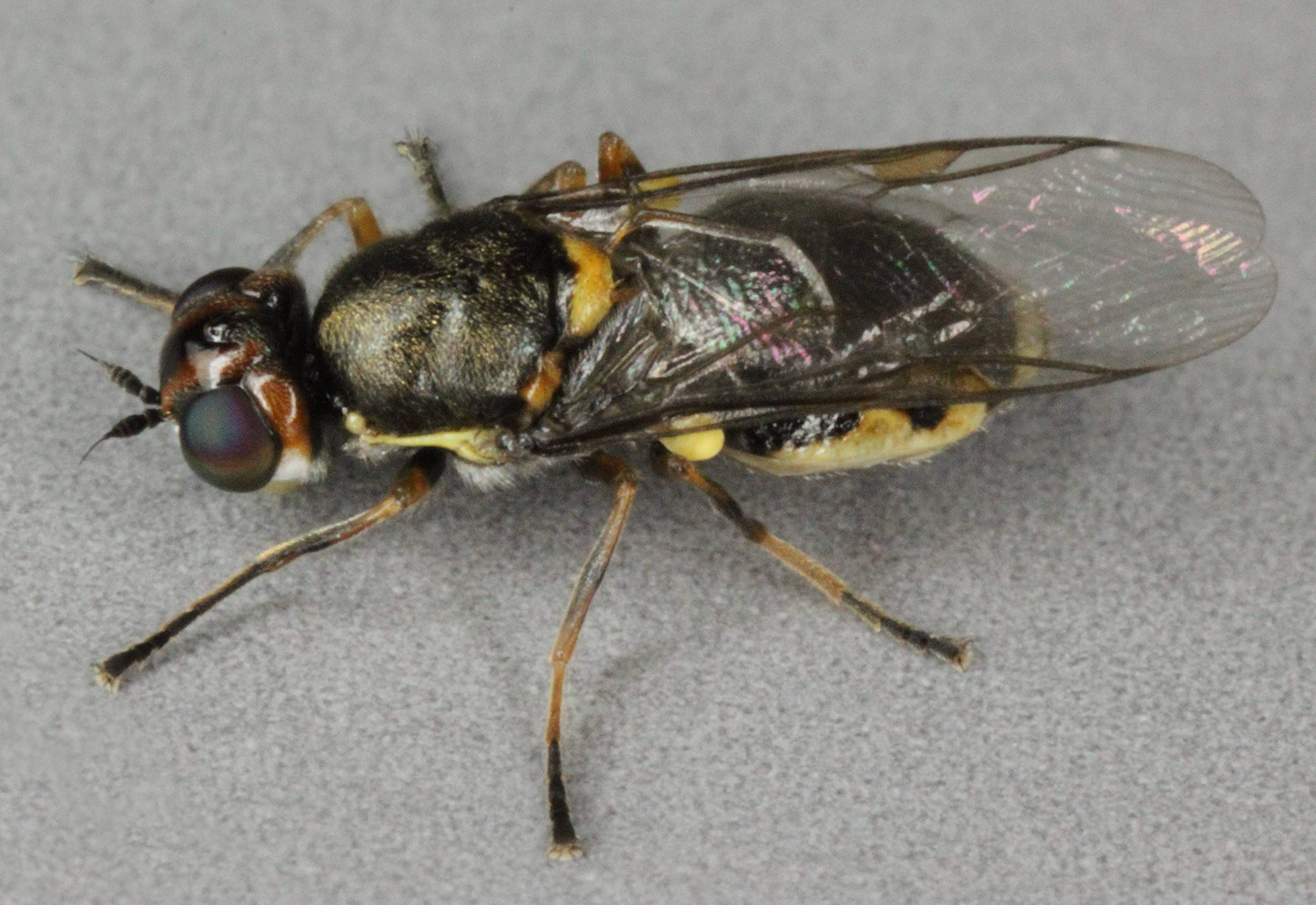
- Oxycera pygmaea North Wales

Scientific classification
- Kingdom: Animalia
- Phylum: Arthropoda
- Class: Insecta
- Order: Diptera
- Family: Stratiomyidae
- Subfamily: Stratiomyinae
- Tribe: Oxycerini
- Genus: Oxycera
- Species: O. pygmaea

Binomial name
- Oxycera pygmaea (Fallén, 1817)

Synonyms
- Stratiomys pygmaea Fallén, 1817; Oxycera affinis Curtis, 1833; Oxycera nigripes Verrall, 1888; Oxycera nigripes Brunetti, 1889; Oxycera nigripes Verrall, 1901; Oxycera nigripes Verrall, 1909; Hermione hungarica Kertész, 1923

= Oxycera pygmaea =

Species of fly

Oxycera pygmaea, the pygmy soldier, is a European species of soldier fly.

== Description ==
The body length is 3.0 to 4.0 mm (0.12 to 0.16 in). Mesonotum punctate, with decumbent grey hairs. Both male and female black with yellow humeri, yellow notopleural margin, and small yellow spots on postalar calli.

== Biology ==
The habitat is wetland, calcareous seepages. The flight period is from June to July.

== Distribution ==
Northern Europe Central Europe up to southern Sweden Central
