= Spiriverpa lunulata =

Scientific classification
- Domain: Eukaryota
- Kingdom: Animalia
- Phylum: Arthropoda
- Class: Insecta
- Order: Diptera
- Family: Therevidae
- Genus: Spiriverpa
- Species: S. lunulata

Binomial name
- Spiriverpa lunulata (Zetterstedt, 1838)

Species of fly

Spiriverpa lunulata is a Palearctic species of stiletto fly in the family Therevidae.
