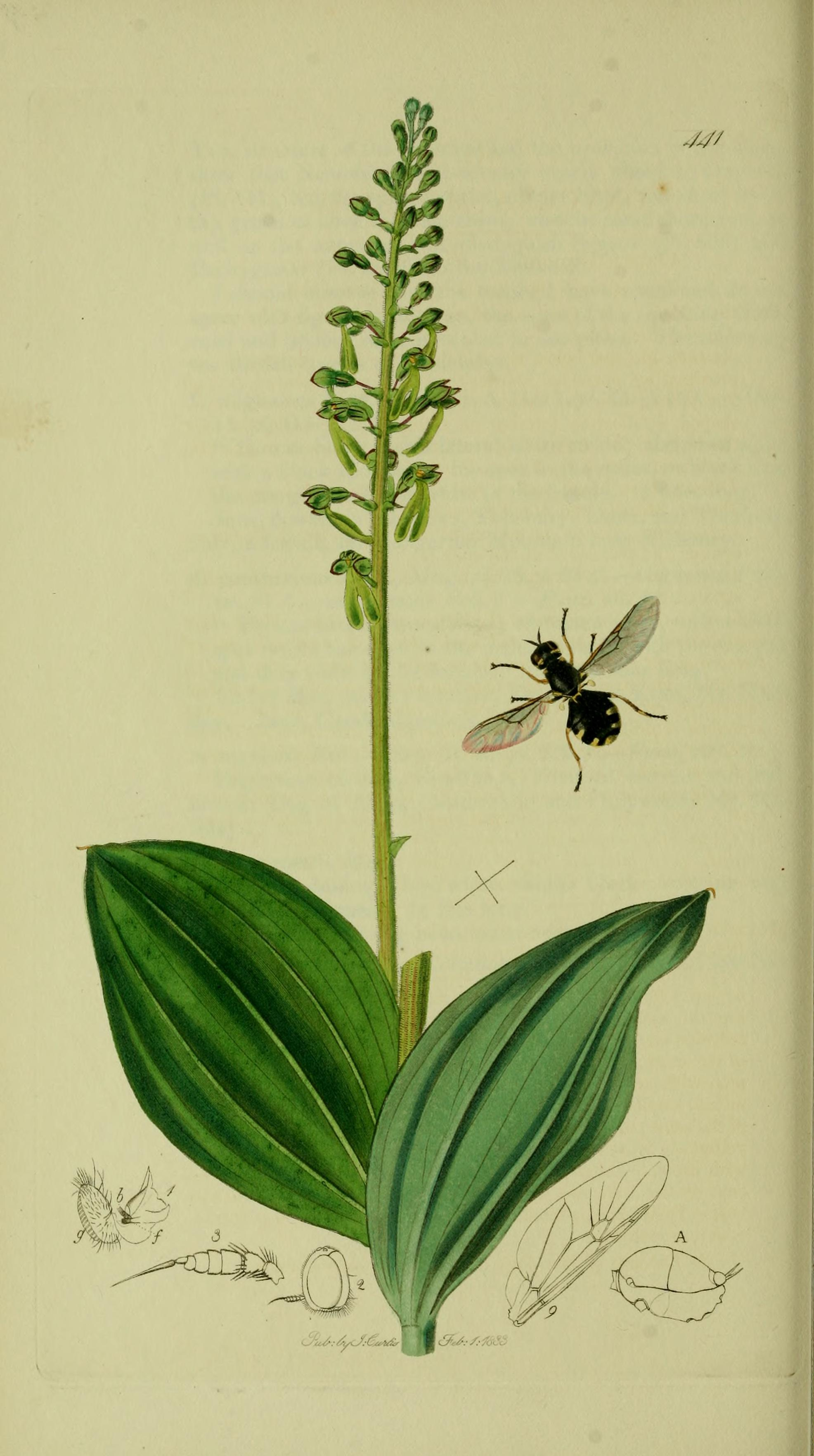
- Oxycera morrisii depicted in British Entomology

Scientific classification
- Kingdom: Animalia
- Phylum: Arthropoda
- Class: Insecta
- Order: Diptera
- Family: Stratiomyidae
- Subfamily: Stratiomyinae
- Tribe: Oxycerini
- Genus: Oxycera
- Species: O. morrisii

Binomial name
- Oxycera morrisii Curtis, 1833

Synonyms
- Oxycera ranzonii Schiner, 1857; Hermione morrisi Lindner, 1938; Hermione ronzonii Vaillant, 1950; Oxycera ronzonii Vaillant, 1950

= Oxycera morrisii =

Species of fly

Oxycera morrisii, the white-barred soldier, is a European species of soldier fly.

== Description ==
Body length L.4-4,5 mm. Cubital vein forked. Scutellum with only the tip yellow. Scutellum has two spines. Abdomen with five transverse whitish yellow isolated spots. A very distinct species. Female. Black. Frons shining, orbits white interrupted on the upper part. Antennae black. One line and a white spot at the wing base. Scutellum white-yellow at the tip. Tarsi yellow. Halteres yellow brown at the base. Abdomen shining black, with five isolated whitish yellow transverse spots, last tergite yellow; sternites brown. - Male. Eyes bare. Sternites II-III-IV yellow medially.

== Biology ==
The habitat is wetlands, marshes. Adults are found in July

== Distribution ==
Northern Europe, Central Europe
