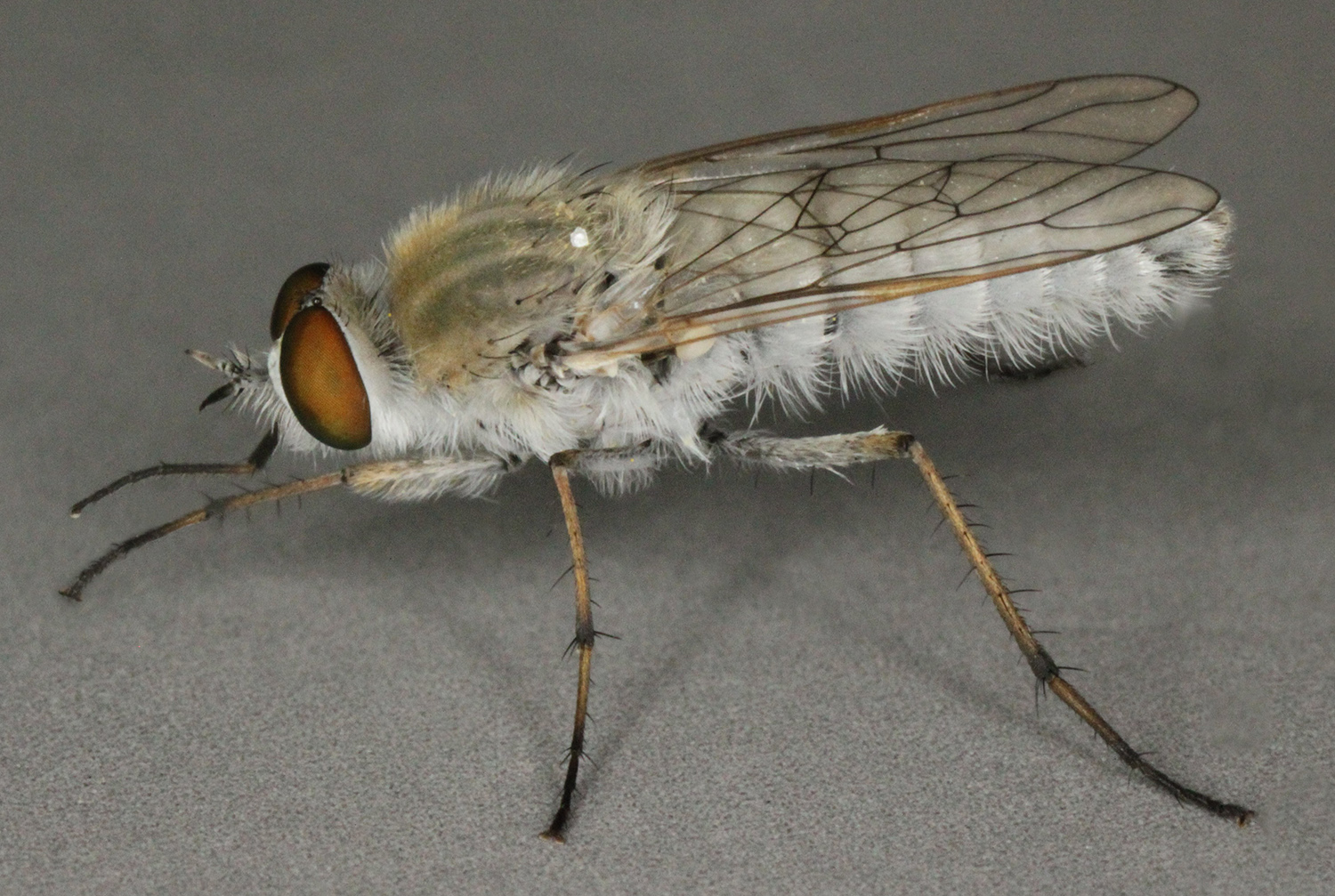
- Acrosathe annulata Dinle beach, North Wales.

Scientific classification
- Kingdom: Animalia
- Phylum: Arthropoda
- Class: Insecta
- Order: Diptera
- Family: Therevidae
- Genus: Acrosathe
- Species: A. annulata

Binomial name
- Acrosathe annulata (Fabricius, 1805)

Synonyms
- Bibio annulata Fabricius, 1805

= Acrosathe annulata =

Species of fly

Acrosathe annulata, also known as coastal silver-stiletto, is a species of stiletto fly belonging to the family Therevidae. It is a Palearctic species that is widely distributed in Europe.

== Description ==
Acrosathe annulata in sand Habitat (Video, 1m 48s)

"Male entirely covered with silvery pubescence; female without any shining black frontal callus. Halteres whitish. Femora blackish in both sexes. Fourth posterior cell closed".

== Biology ==
Its habitats are sand dunes and sand hills. They rest on hot bare sand among marram.
