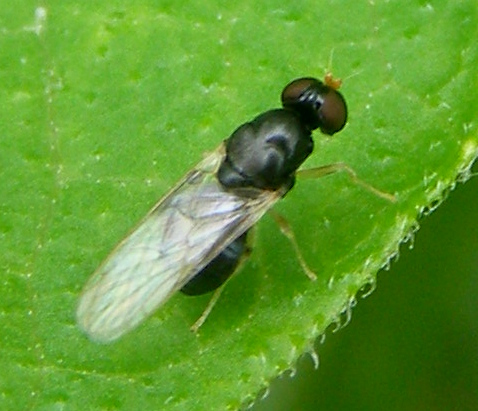

Scientific classification
- Kingdom: Animalia
- Phylum: Arthropoda
- Class: Insecta
- Order: Diptera
- Family: Stratiomyidae
- Subfamily: Pachygastrinae
- Genus: Pachygaster
- Species: P. leachii

Binomial name
- Pachygaster leachii Stephens in Curtis, 1824

Synonyms
- Pachygaster pallipennis Macquart, 1834; Pachygaster pallidipennis Meigen, 1838; Pachygaster flavipes Costa, 1845; Pachygaster teachi Brunetti, 1889; Pachygaster angustifrons Krivosheina, 2004

= Pachygaster leachii =

Species of fly

Pachygaster leachii, the yellow-legged black, is a European species of soldier fly.

== Description ==
A minute fly of brilliant black color with a round abdomen and a body length of around 2.5-3.5 mm. The eyes are brown-red in males and obscure green in females. Both males and females have yellow antennae. The legs are of a pale yellow with a blackish ring, sometimes quite wide, at the apex of femora III. It has yellowish wings with pale veins. The halteres are yellowish-brown at the base.

== Biology ==
The habitat is woodland with oak and elm. Associated with alder, hazel. The flight period is from June to August.

== Distribution ==
Andorra, Austria, Azerbaijan, Belgium, Bulgaria, Czech Republic, England, France, Georgia, Germany, Hungary, Ireland, Italy, Netherlands, Poland, Portugal, Romania, Russia, Slovakia, Spain, Sweden, Switzerland, Wales, Yugoslavia.
