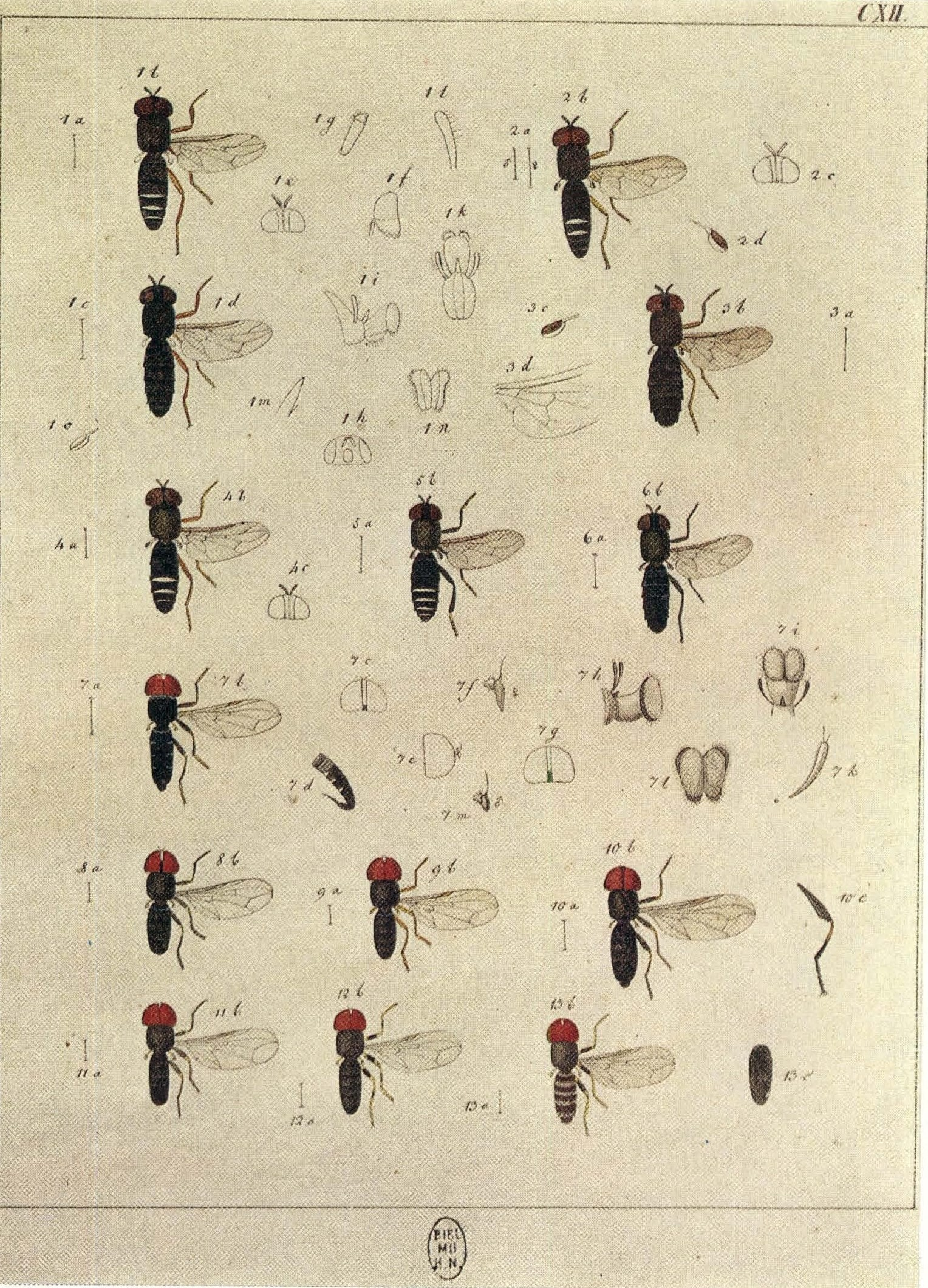
- Scenopinus niger in Johann Wilhelm Meigen Europäischen Zweiflügeligen

Scientific classification
- Domain: Eukaryota
- Kingdom: Animalia
- Phylum: Arthropoda
- Class: Insecta
- Order: Diptera
- Family: Scenopinidae
- Genus: Scenopinus
- Species: S. niger

Binomial name
- Scenopinus niger (De Geer, 1776)

= Scenopinus niger =

Species of fly

Scenopinus niger , a 'window fly', is a member of the Scenopinidae family of flies. It is found in the Palearctic.

Scenopinus niger is "a rather small, very black oblong fly. Legs blackish except on the tarsi. Frons rather shining. Eyes of the male widely separated. Hind tibite of the male very much dilated.". It is a minor pest
