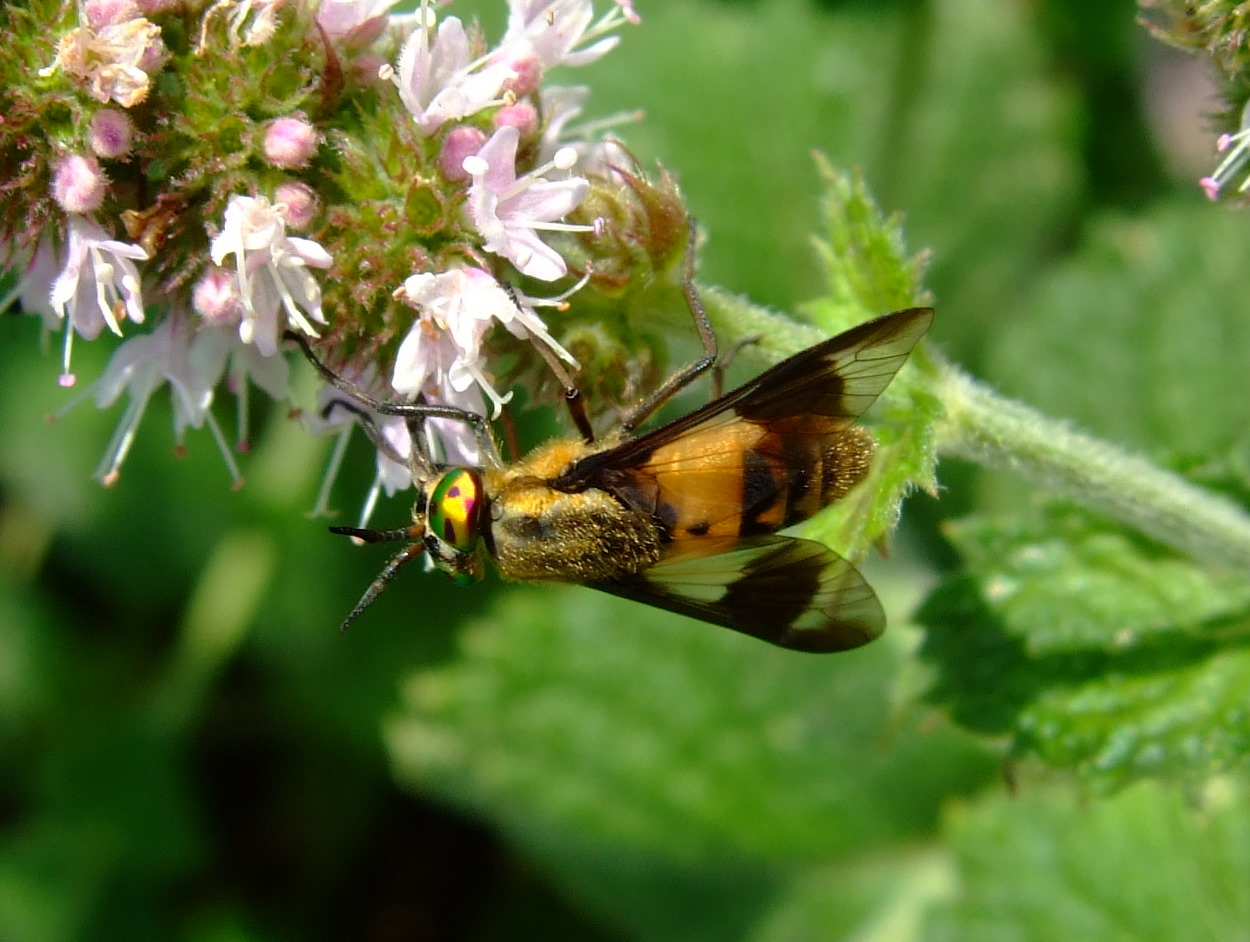

Scientific classification
- Kingdom: Animalia
- Phylum: Arthropoda
- Clade: Pancrustacea
- Class: Insecta
- Order: Diptera
- Family: Tabanidae
- Subfamily: Chrysopsinae
- Tribe: Chrysopsini
- Genus: Chrysops
- Species: C. viduatus

Binomial name
- Chrysops viduatus (Fabricius, 1794)

Synonyms
- Chrysops pictus Meigen, 1820; Chrysops quadratus Meigen, 1820

= Chrysops viduatus =

Species of fly

Chrysops viduatus is a species of horse fly belonging to the family Tabanidae.

It is a Palearctic species with a limited distribution in Europe

== Description ==
The middle tibiae of C. viduatus are distinctly yellow-brown. The second abdominal segment is yellow with a well-defined quadrate black spot.

== Biology ==
Chrysops viduatus occurs in wet meadows, mires, fens and wet woodlands. The larvae feed on organic matter in wet peaty detritus. Adults feed on large mammals including cattle, horses and deer.
