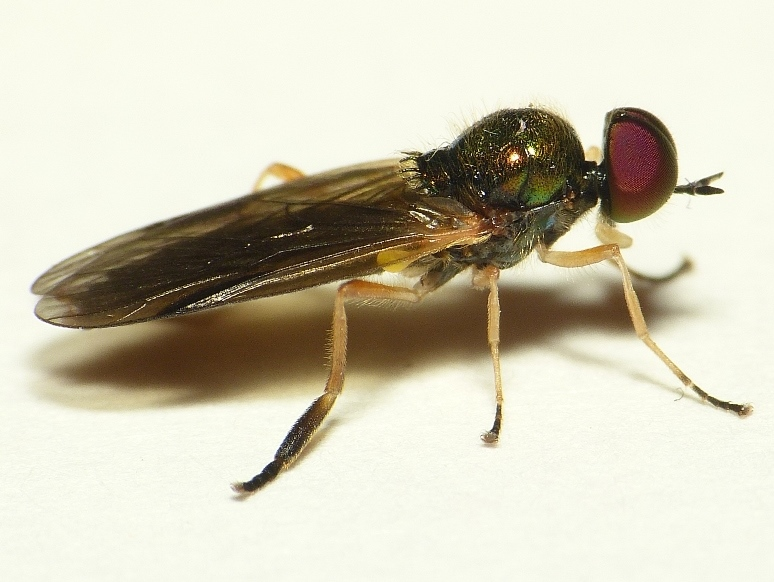
- Beris morrisii

Scientific classification
- Kingdom: Animalia
- Phylum: Arthropoda
- Class: Insecta
- Order: Diptera
- Family: Stratiomyidae
- Subfamily: Beridinae
- Genus: Beris
- Species: B. morrisii

Binomial name
- Beris morrisii Dale, 1841

Synonyms
- Beris pallipes Loew, 1846; Beris morrisi Enderlein, 1921

= Beris morrisii =

Species of fly

Beris morrisii, the yellow-legged black legionnaire, is a European species of soldier fly.

== Description ==
Length 6.0 to 7.0 mm with narrow frons and face and antennae that are inserted well below the middle of the head profile. 3rd segment of antennae equal to or slightly longer than basal segments together. Face with light-colored pubescence. Yellow thoracic pile and yellow halteres. Uniformly yellow legs except for dark tarsi (basitarsi often yellow in the females). Wings hyaline or slightly yellowish, with distinct brown pterostigma. Outer margin of epandrium pubescent.

== Biology ==
The flight period is May to September .Beris morrisi Larvae have been found in tunnels of Cheilosia canicularis Panzer (Syrphidae) in rhizomes of Petasites.
