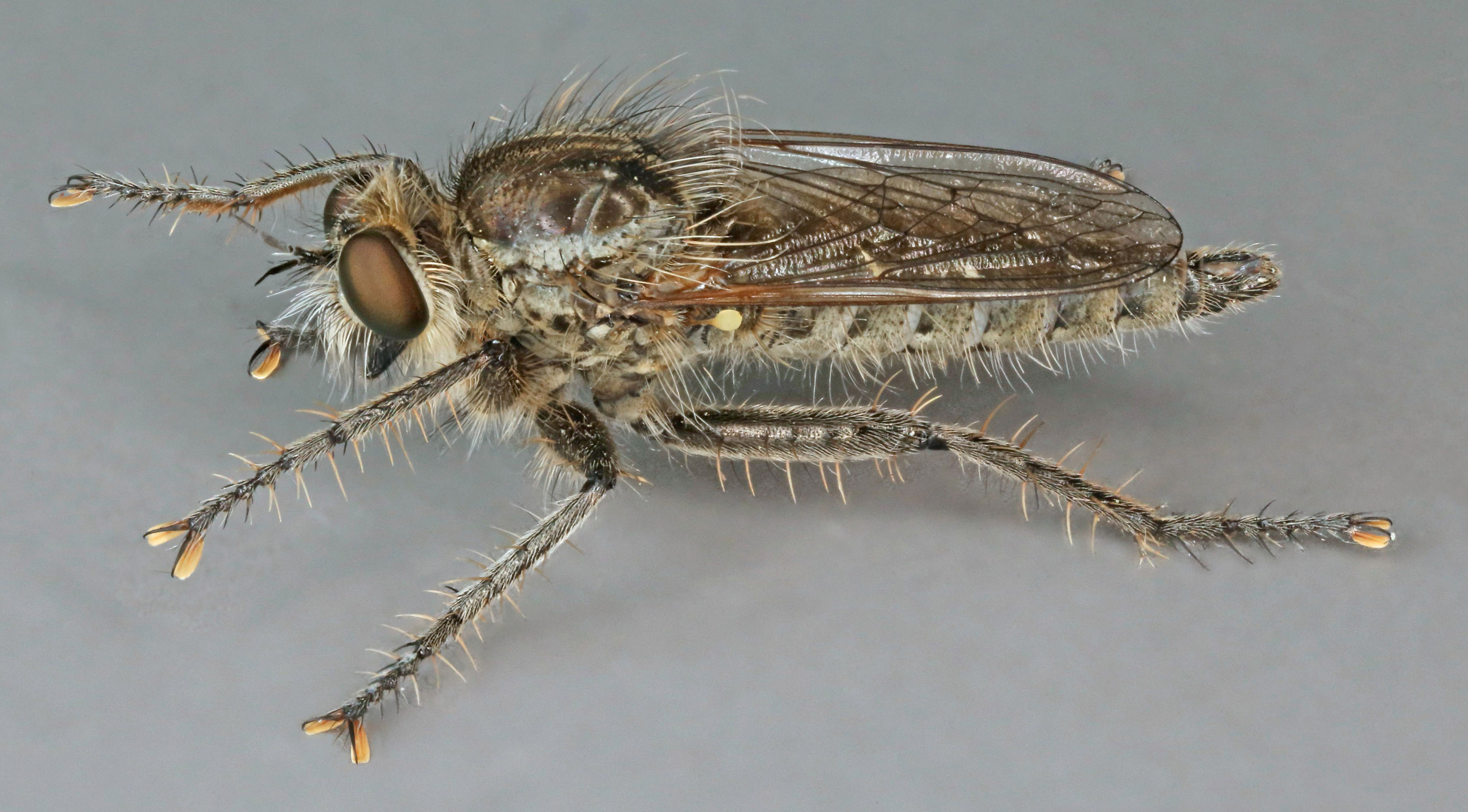
- Philonicus albiceps Anglesey, North Wales

Scientific classification
- Kingdom: Animalia
- Phylum: Arthropoda
- Clade: Pancrustacea
- Class: Insecta
- Order: Diptera
- Family: Asilidae
- Genus: Philonicus
- Species: P. albiceps

Binomial name
- Philonicus albiceps (Meigen, 1820)

= Philonicus albiceps =

Species of fly

Philonicus albiceps is a species of 'robber fly' belonging to the family Asilidae. It is a Palearctic species with a limited distribution in Europe

== Description ==
Philonicus albiceps is light yellowish grey, silvery and often with darker markings. The legs are black. It has a scutellum with two pale marginal bristles and an ovipositor with a circlet of short spines".The body length is up to 18mm.sil

Philonicus albiceps with prey

== Biology ==
The habitat is coastal sand dunes, sitting on bare sand among marram (more rarely at sandy places inland). Prey species include other dipteran species, including smaller asilids, Hymenoptera and Odonata.
