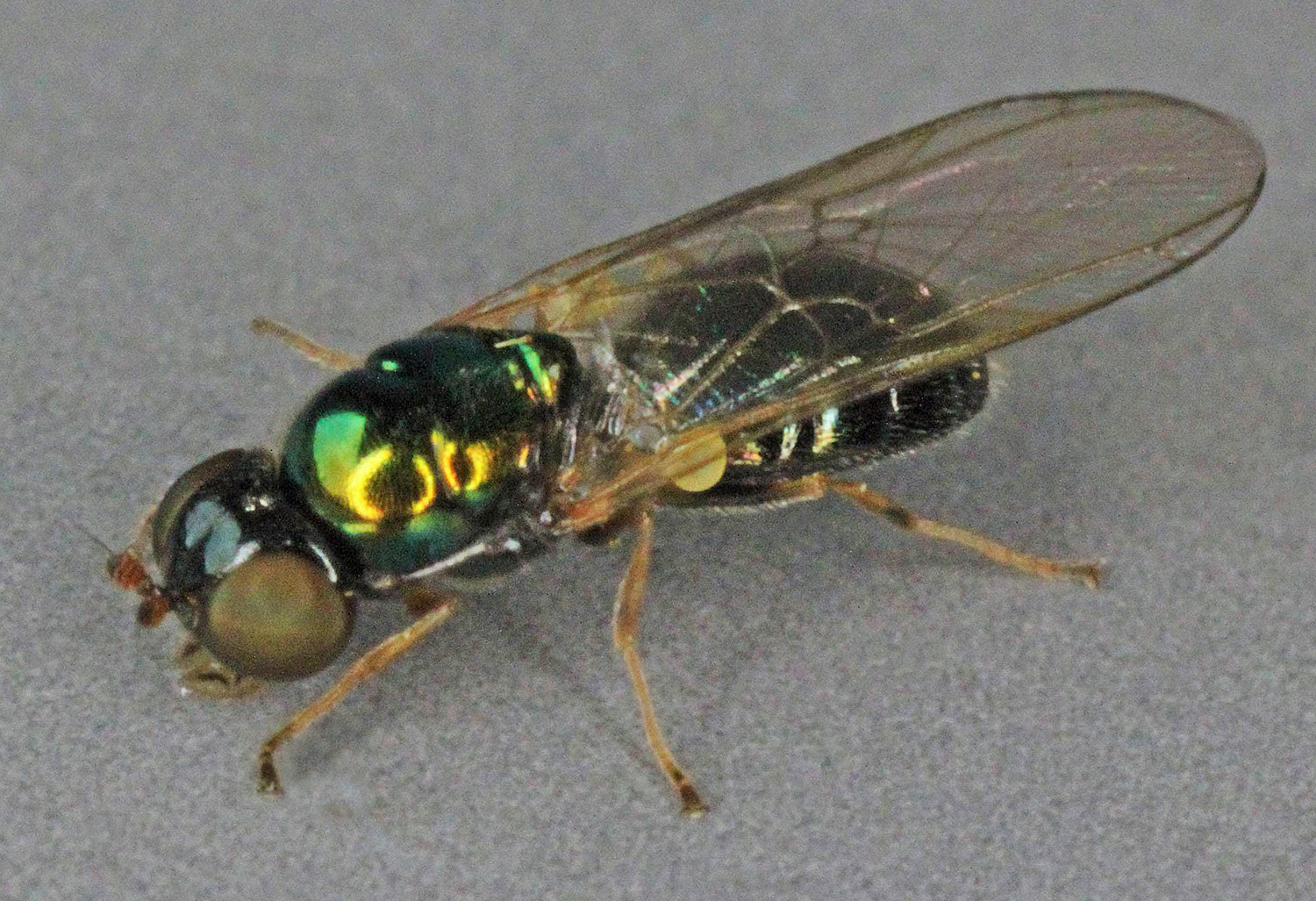

Scientific classification
- Kingdom: Animalia
- Phylum: Arthropoda
- Class: Insecta
- Order: Diptera
- Family: Stratiomyidae
- Subfamily: Sarginae
- Genus: Microchrysa
- Species: M. cyaneiventris

Binomial name
- Microchrysa cyaneiventris (Zetterstedt, 1842)

Synonyms
- Chrysomyia cyaneiventris Zetterstedt, 1842

= Microchrysa cyaneiventris =

Species of fly

Microchrysa cyaneiventris, the black gem, is a European species of soldier fly.

== Description ==
The body of the black gem is around four millimetres long. It has yellow antennae and predominantly yellow legs. It is pubescent in middle part of the mesonotum. Male black gems have a light-colored abdomen, whereas the female flies have shiny black abdomen and frons, with a light bluish tinge.

== Biology ==
The flight period lasts from May to September. The habitats of the black gem are deciduous woodland edges, hedgerows, isolated trees, and bushes. It is associated with water margins and fallen decomposing leaves. Larvae have been found in decaying vegetation and moss.

== Distribution ==
The black gem can be found in Northern and Central Europe.
