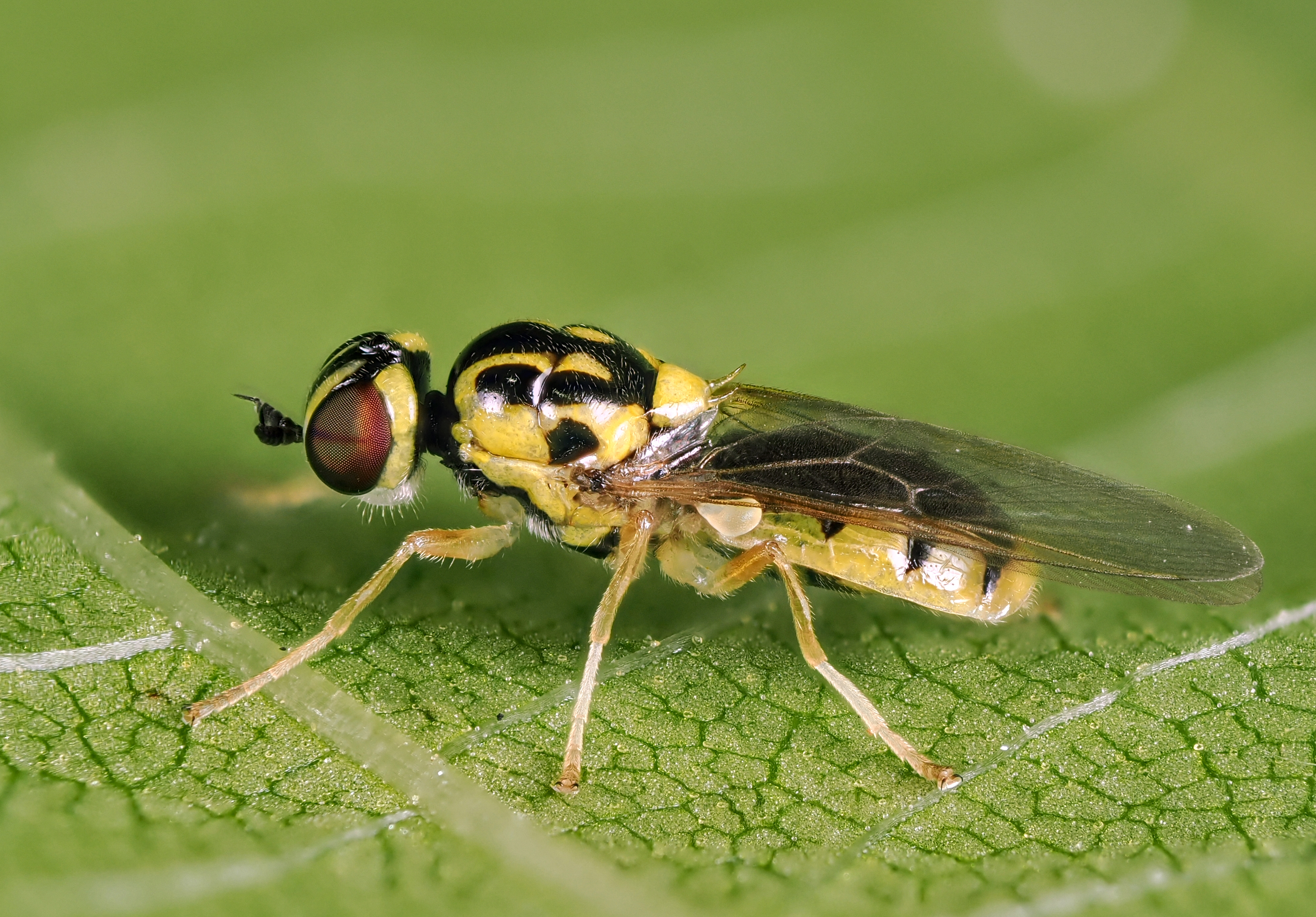

Scientific classification
- Kingdom: Animalia
- Phylum: Arthropoda
- Class: Insecta
- Order: Diptera
- Family: Stratiomyidae
- Subfamily: Stratiomyinae
- Tribe: Oxycerini
- Genus: Oxycera
- Species: O. nigricornis

Binomial name
- Oxycera nigricornis Olivier, 1811

Synonyms
- Oxycera formosa Meigen, 1822

= Oxycera nigricornis =

Species of fly

Oxycera nigricornis, the delicate soldier, is a European species of soldier fly.

== Description ==
Vein RH5 is simple. The thorax is very bare and shining in both sexes; in the females, longitudinal stripes are joined anteriorly to large patches on the nototpleuron.

== Biology ==
The habitat is wetlands, marshes. Adults are found June to August.

== Distribution ==
Taiga and forest zones of the European part of the USSR and Siberia, northern Kazakhstan, Primor'e Territory. North and Central belts of Western Europe, northern Mongolia.
