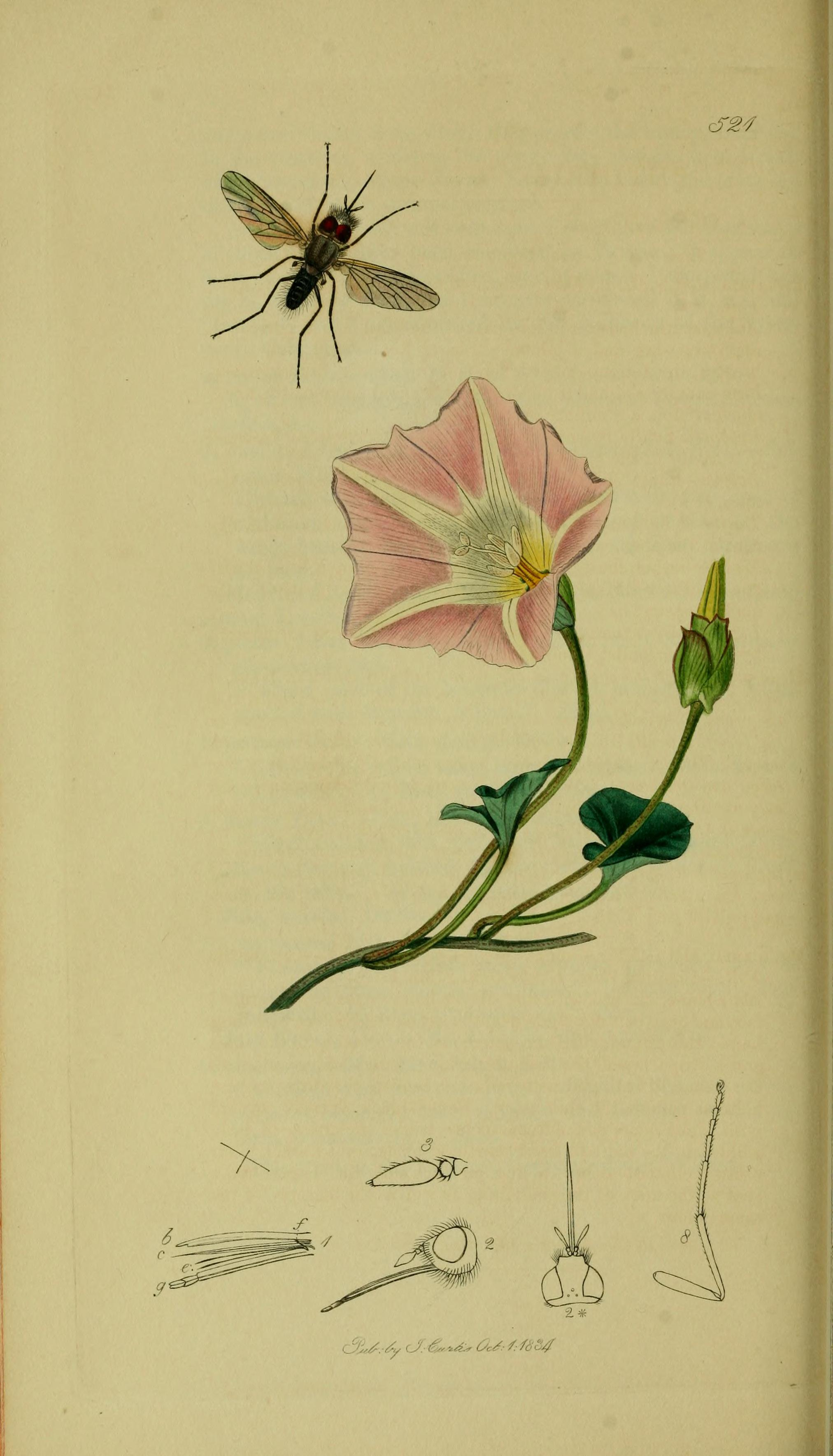
- Phthiria pulicaria British Entomology

Scientific classification
- Kingdom: Animalia
- Phylum: Arthropoda
- Class: Insecta
- Order: Diptera
- Family: Bombyliidae
- Genus: Phthiria
- Species: P. pulicaria

Binomial name
- Phthiria pulicaria Mikan, 1796

= Phthiria pulicaria =

Species of fly

Phthiria pulicaria is a species of ' bee flies' belonging to the family Bombyliidae. It is a Palearctic species with a limited distribution in Europe.

== Description ==
A tiny beefly 4-4.5mm long. "Scutellum all black or at the utmost with a yellow spot at its tip. Frons strongly prominent. Wings with the third posterior cell rather contracted towards the wingmargin."

== Biology ==
Found on bare patches of sand amongst short herbage near coast sand-hills.
