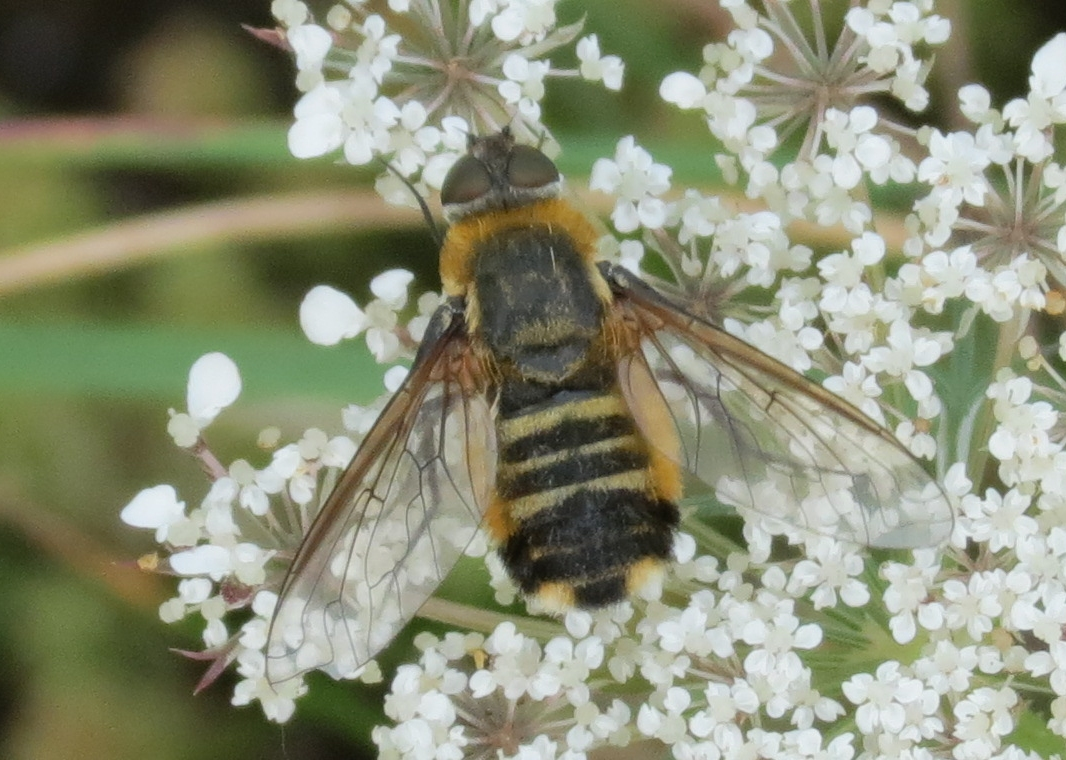
- Vila modesta female
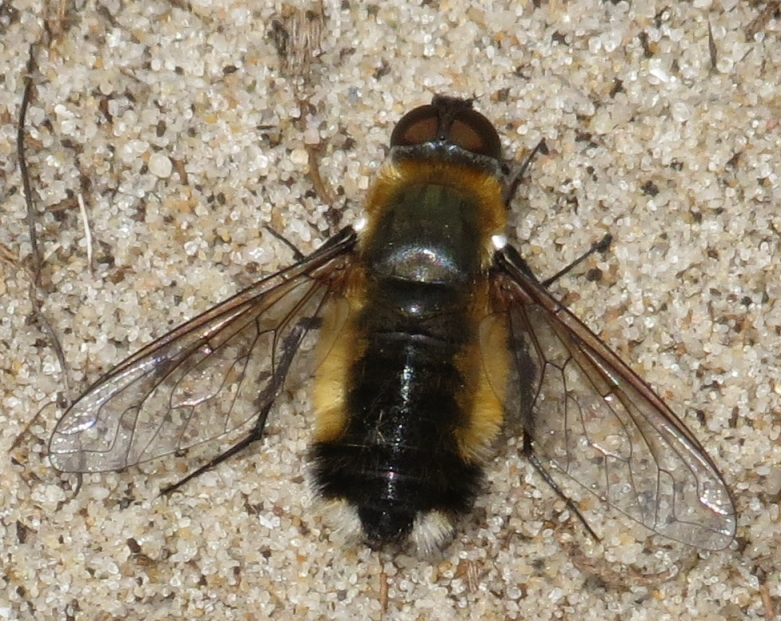
- Vila modesta male

Scientific classification
- Kingdom: Animalia
- Phylum: Arthropoda
- Clade: Pancrustacea
- Class: Insecta
- Order: Diptera
- Family: Bombyliidae
- Subfamily: Anthracinae
- Tribe: Villini
- Genus: Villa
- Species: V. modesta

Binomial name
- Villa modesta (Meigen, 1820)

Synonyms
- Anthrax modesta Meigen, 1820

= Villa modesta =

Species of fly

Villa modesta is a species of fly in the family Bombyliidae. The larvae may feed on larvae of Lepidoptera.

== Distribution ==
Villa modesta can be found in June to September in coastal dune areas throughout mainland Europe, in Britain and to the north in Norway.

== Description ==
Villa modesta is a fairly large fly, the body length is 10–14 mm. The body is brown. The female has pale bands on tergites 2,3 and 4. The male does not have bands but has tufts of hair at the end of the abdomen and at the base of the wings. The wings are transparent with a narrow brown front margin.Seguy (1927) provides a key to most European Bombyliidae

== Behaviour ==
Like many other bombyliids, the eggs are flicked by the adult females toward dark holes. The females may be found hovering near a dark hole in the sand shooting eggs. An animation, 6 times retarded, is given here.

Villa modesta shooting an egg into a hole

Every now and then the females are rubbing the abdomen in the sand in a small circular movement. Sand is necessary to make the eggs less tacky. To this end the females do have a sand chamber. An animation is given here.

Villa modesta female filling the sand chamber

== Courtship ==
The males have a choice between two strategies to gain access to a female. The males may search through the vegetation for females. When a female has been found the male will go into a hovering state near the female as given in this animation.

Villa modesta courtship. Female is present in the lower right.

The males may also choose a sit and wait strategy, sitting in the sand and chasing after passing females.
