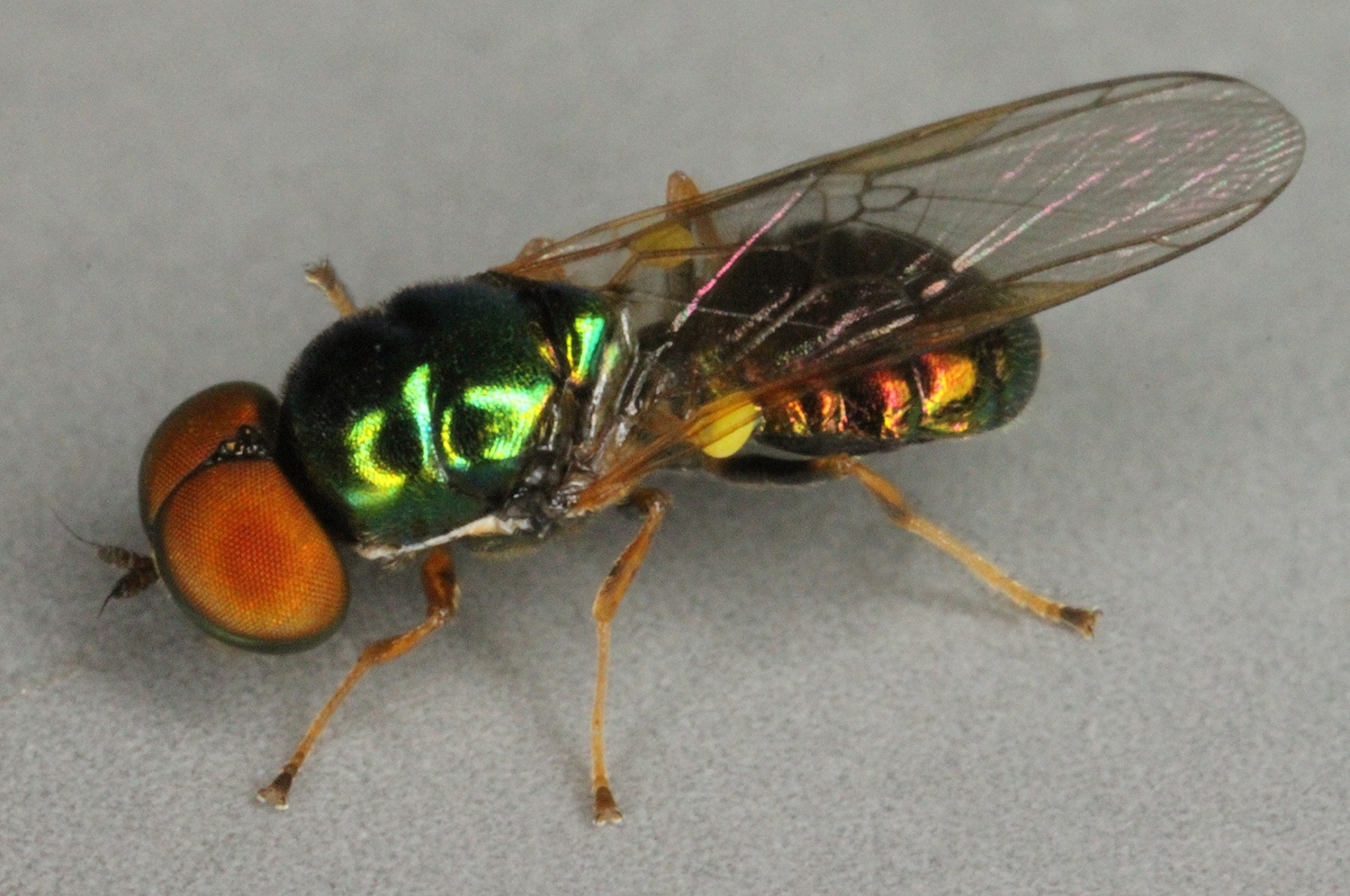

Scientific classification
- Kingdom: Animalia
- Phylum: Arthropoda
- Class: Insecta
- Order: Diptera
- Family: Stratiomyidae
- Subfamily: Sarginae
- Genus: Microchrysa
- Species: M. flavicornis

Binomial name
- Microchrysa flavicornis (Meigen, 1822)

Synonyms
- Sargus flavicornis Meigen, 1822; Microchrysa pallipes (Meigen, 1830); Sargus pallipes Meigen, 1830

= Microchrysa flavicornis =

Species of fly

Microchrysa flavicornis, the green gem, is a European species of soldier fly.

== Description ==
A small species (Body 4.5 to 5.0 mm. long) Antennae red-yellow, third antennomere brown, arista black. Legs predominantly yellow, femora III blackish. Pubescence in middle part of mesonotum and on abdomen light-colored in male. Abdomen of female and also frons of female metallic green. Halteres yellow. Wings hyaline. Abdomen with golden reflections.

== Biology ==
The flight period is June to August. Habitats are deciduous woodland edges, hedgerows, isolated trees and bushes. Larvae have been found in dung.

== Distribution ==
North Europe. Central Europe.
