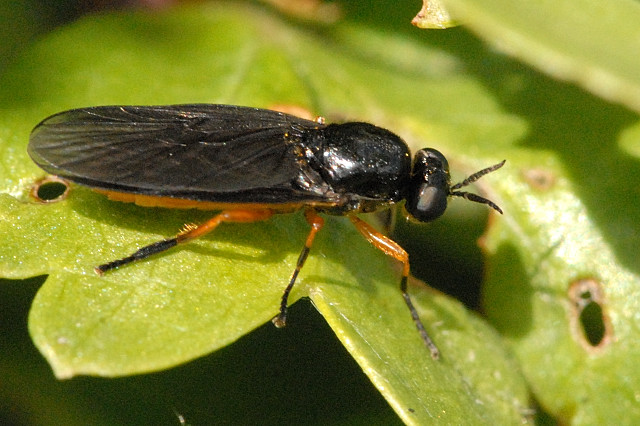
- Beris clavipes

Scientific classification
- Kingdom: Animalia
- Phylum: Arthropoda
- Clade: Pancrustacea
- Class: Insecta
- Order: Diptera
- Family: Stratiomyidae
- Subfamily: Beridinae
- Genus: Beris
- Species: B. clavipes

Binomial name
- Beris clavipes (Linnaeus, 1767)

Synonyms
- Musca clavipes Linnaeus, 1767

= Beris clavipes =

Species of fly

Beris clavipes, the scarce orange legionnaire, is a European species of soldier fly (from northern and central Europe down into France, towards north to middle Sweden).

== Description ==
Length 6—6.3 mm. Male. Eyes hairy, facets in about the upper two thirds larger than below. Antennae black, the first joint longer than the second. Thorax black with blackish pubescence. Abdomen orange with brownish pubescence, which is long at the margin: the base brown; on the second to sixth segment the transverse, impressed line just in front of the hind margin is more or less distinctly blackish: the seventh segment is not brown. Venter yellowish red. Legs yellow; the apical half of the anterior tibiae, the hind tibiae at the tips and all tarsi blackish:the hind metatarsi much thickened. Legs with fine, yellowish pubescence. Wings considerably brownish and more so than in vallata especially towards the anterior margin, veins brown: stigma not conspicuous. Halteres brownish.

Female. Eyes sparingly and very short hairy. Frons broad, black. Thorax with brown pubescence. Abdomen not brown at the base: wings nearly as brown as in the male.

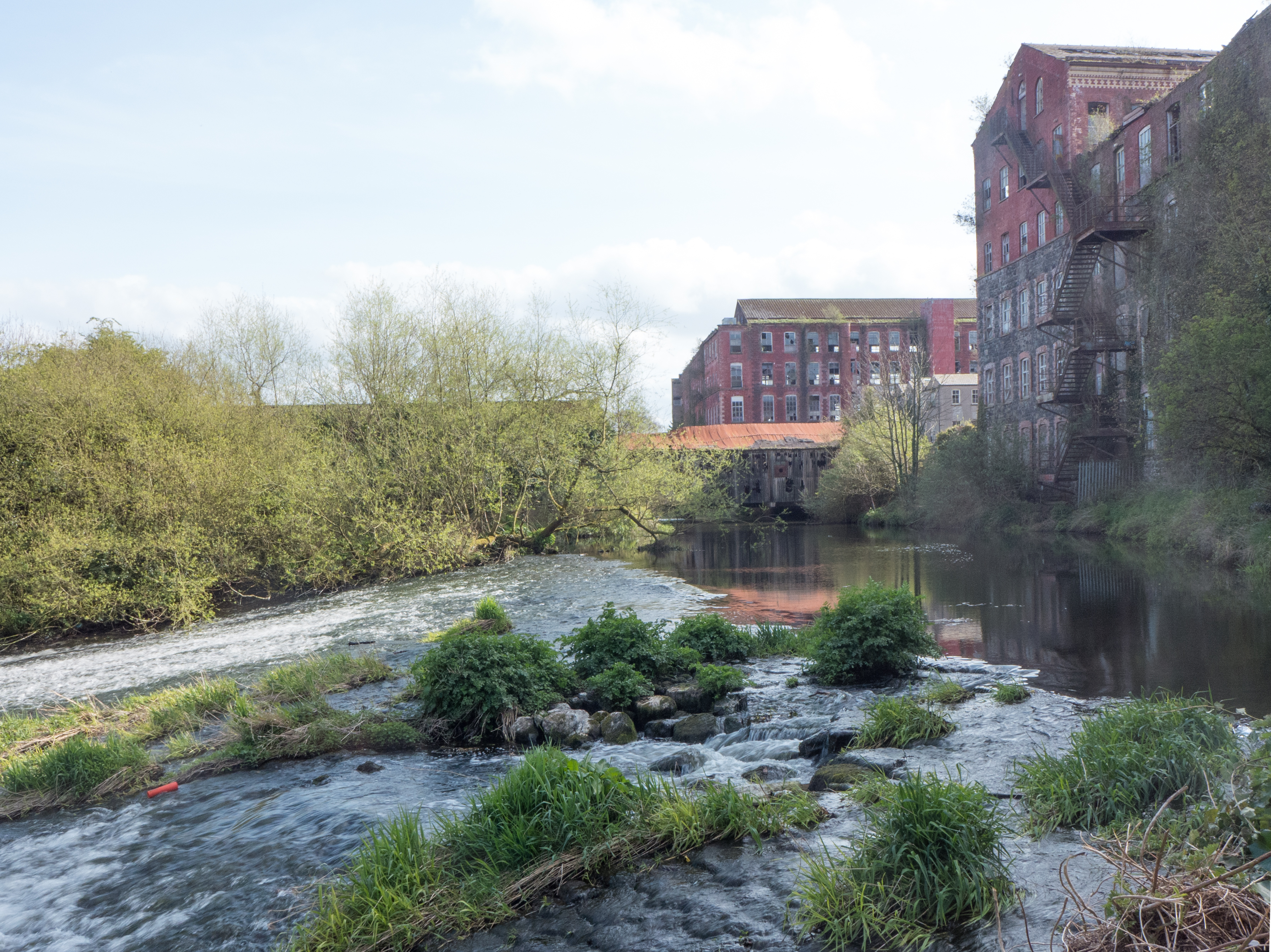
Habitat. Ireland

== Biology ==
The habitat is wetland and flowing water locations with trees and shrubs. Adults are found from April to September.The larvae are found in wet moss.

== Distribution ==
Austria, Belgium, Bulgaria, Czech Republic, Denmark, Finland, England, Estonia, France, Georgia, Germany, Hungary, Iceland, Ireland, Italy, Latvia, Lithuania, Netherlands, Norway, Poland, Romania, Russia, Slovakia, Spain, Sweden, Switzerland, Ukraine
