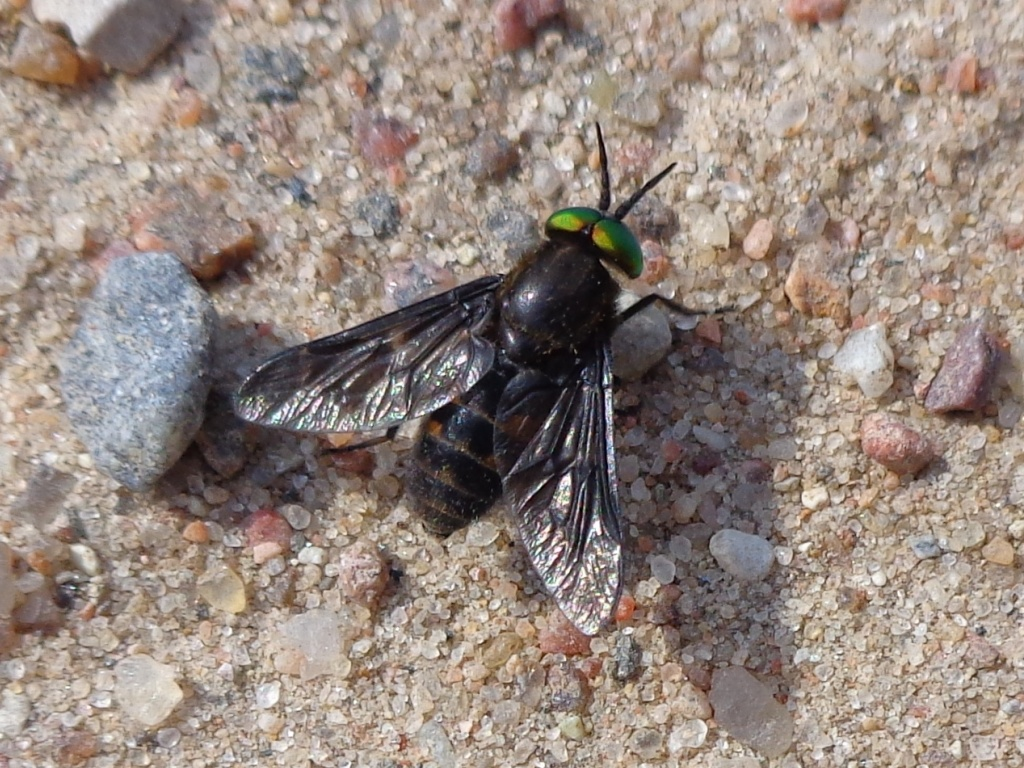
- Chrysops sepulcralis

Scientific classification
- Kingdom: Animalia
- Phylum: Arthropoda
- Clade: Pancrustacea
- Class: Insecta
- Order: Diptera
- Family: Tabanidae
- Subfamily: Chrysopsinae
- Tribe: Chrysopsini
- Genus: Chrysops
- Species: C. sepulcralis

Binomial name
- Chrysops sepulcralis (Fabricius, 1794)

Synonyms
- Chrysops maurus Siebke, 1863

= Chrysops sepulcralis =

Species of fly

Chrysops sepulcralis is a species of 'horse flies' belonging to the family Tabanidae.

It is a Palearctic species with a limited distribution in Europe.

== Description ==
The abdomen is black, dorsally and ventrally, and without a conspicuous yellow pattern. The frons and face are almost entirely bare, shining brown.

== Biology ==
Chrysops sepulcralis is found near ponds and boggy areas on heaths and moors.
