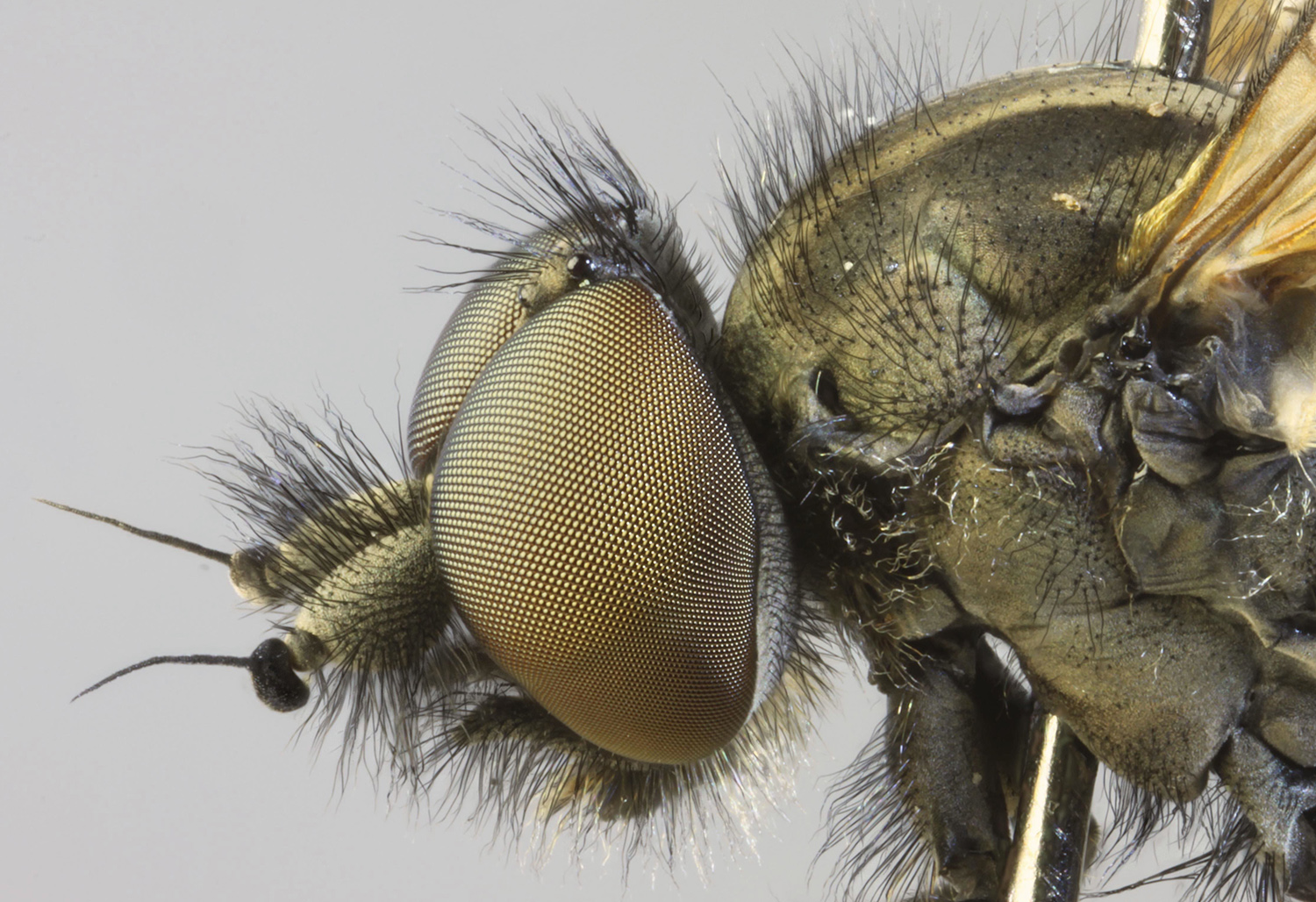
- Symphoromyia crassicornis male

Scientific classification
- Kingdom: Animalia
- Phylum: Arthropoda
- Clade: Pancrustacea
- Class: Insecta
- Order: Diptera
- Family: Rhagionidae
- Genus: Symphoromyia
- Species: S. crassicornis

Binomial name
- Symphoromyia crassicornis (Panzer 1806)

= Symphoromyia crassicornis =

Species of fly

Symphoromyia crassicornis is a species of 'snipe flies' belonging to the family Rhagionidae.

This species is present in most of Europe.

== Description ==
Symphoromyia crassicornis is 8 mm. long, and robust. The first antennal segment is strongly swollen in both sexes, bigger than second and third segments together, and very hairy, especially in the male. The palpi are slightly swollen. The eyes of males touch for a short distance, and the upper facets are greatly enlarged. The frons of the female is broader.

== Biology ==
The larvae are found in damp soil underneath plants and under mosses.
