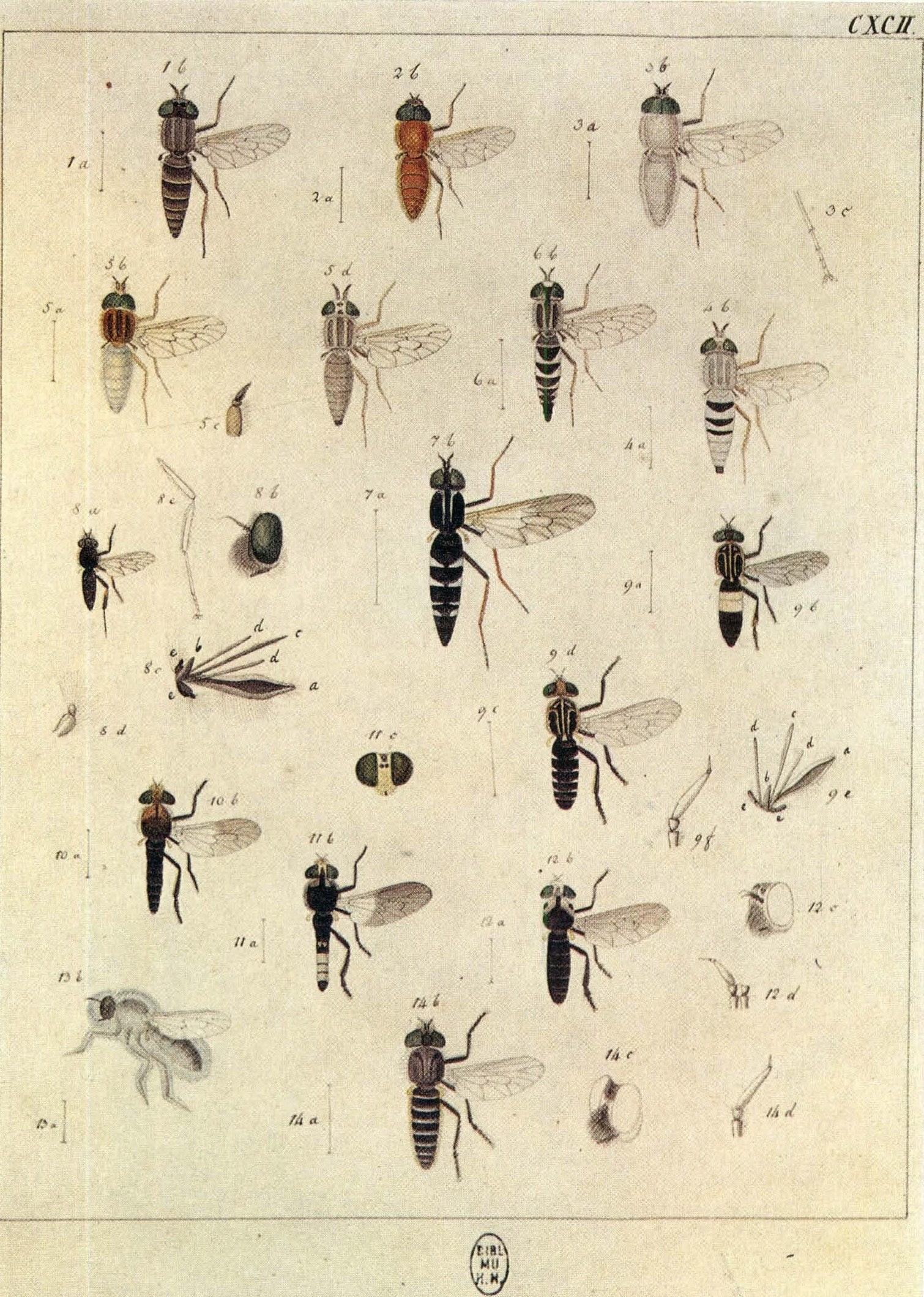
- Dialineura anilis as Thereva anilis in Meigen Europäischen Zweiflügeligen (figure 5)

Scientific classification
- Kingdom: Animalia
- Phylum: Arthropoda
- Class: Insecta
- Order: Diptera
- Family: Therevidae
- Genus: Dialineura
- Species: D. anilis

Binomial name
- Dialineura anilis (Linnaeus, 1761)

= Dialineura anilis =

Species of fly

Dialineura anilis is a species of ' stiletto flies' belonging to the family Therevidae. It is a Palearctic species with a limited distribution in Europe.

== Description ==
"Face bare; frons hairy. Antennae with the basal joint conspicuously incrassated. Wings with the fourth posterior cell wide open. Abdomen of the male entirely clothed with silvery pubescence, but the thorax light brown. Female without any shining black frontal callus, and with the femora all orange.".

== Biology ==
Habitat:Sand hills and dunes.
