= Zoltán Szilády =

Zoltán Szilády (21 May 1878 – 15 April 1947) was a Hungarian museologist, entomologist and university lecturer and teacher. He specialised in Diptera. He was born in Budapest and died aged 68 in Grosspösna, Germany.

== Works ==
Partial List

- A magyar állattani irodalom ismertetése. III. [Description of the Hungarian zoological literature III.] 1890-1900 (ed.) (Magyar Természettudományi Társulat, Bp. 1903)
- Über paläarktischen Syrphiden. I-IV. (Annales historico-naturales Musei nationalis hungarici, 29, 1935, 213-216, 31, 1937–38, 137-143, 32, 1939, 136-140, 33, 1940, 54-70)
- Jegyzetek a legyek lábszerkezetéről [Notes on the structure of Diptera legs] (Állattani Közlemények 34, 1937, 87-92)
- A magyar birodalom legyeinek szinopszisa. VI. Talpaslegyek, Clythidae (Platypezidae); VIII. Lauxaniidae [Synopsis of the flies of the Hungarian empire] (Matematikai és Természettudományi Értesítő, 60, 1941, 627-633, 913-924).

== Notes ==
Módin László (ed.): Bibliographia Universitatis Debreceniensis Pars I. Facultas Scientiarum Naturalium 1914-1955. (Tankönyvkiadó, Bp. 1956, 72-184).
