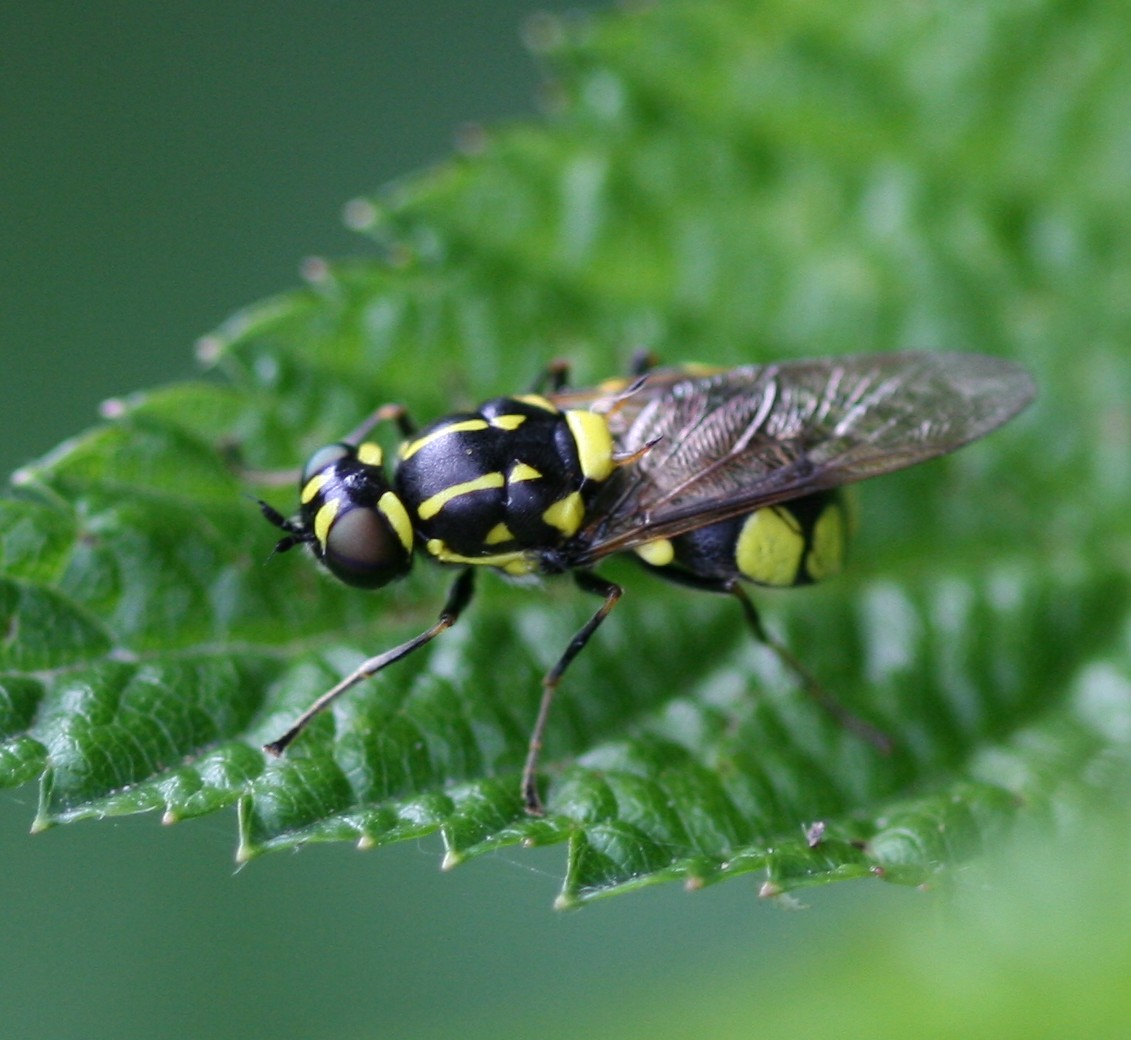

Scientific classification
- Kingdom: Animalia
- Phylum: Arthropoda
- Clade: Pancrustacea
- Class: Insecta
- Order: Diptera
- Family: Stratiomyidae
- Subfamily: Stratiomyinae
- Tribe: Oxycerini; Enderlein, 1914

= Oxycerini =

Tribe of flies

Oxycerini is a tribe of flies in the family Stratiomyidae.

== Genera ==
- Caloparyphus James, 1939
- Euparyphus Gerstaecker, 1857
- Oxycera Meigen, 1803
- Oxycerina Rozkošný & Woodley, 2010
- Vanoyia Villeneuve, 1908
