= Australoactina imperfecta =

Scientific classification
- Kingdom: Animalia
- Phylum: Arthropoda
- Clade: Pancrustacea
- Class: Insecta
- Order: Diptera
- Family: Stratiomyidae
- Subfamily: Beridinae
- Genus: Australoactina
- Species: A. imperfecta

Binomial name
- Australoactina imperfecta (Hardy, 1932)

Synonyms
- Actina imperfecta Hardy, 1932

Species of soldier fly

Australoactina imperfecta is a species of soldier fly in the family Stratiomyidae. It was first described by George Henry Hardy in 1932 as Actina imperfecta.

== Distribution ==
Australoactina imperfecta is known from Australia.
