= Chorisops tunisiae =

Scientific classification
- Kingdom: Animalia
- Phylum: Arthropoda
- Class: Insecta
- Order: Diptera
- Family: Stratiomyidae
- Subfamily: Beridinae
- Genus: Chorisops
- Species: C. tunisiae

Binomial name
- Chorisops tunisiae (Becker, 1915)

Synonyms
- Beris tunisiae Becker, 1915

Species of fly

Chorisops tunisiae, is a European species of soldier fly.

== Distribution ==
Algeria, Morocco, Portugal, Spain, Tunisia.
