= Chorisops caroli =

Scientific classification
- Kingdom: Animalia
- Phylum: Arthropoda
- Clade: Pancrustacea
- Class: Insecta
- Order: Diptera
- Family: Stratiomyidae
- Subfamily: Beridinae
- Genus: Chorisops
- Species: C. caroli

Binomial name
- Chorisops caroli Troiano, 1995

Species of fly

Chorisops caroli, is a European species of soldier fly.

== Distribution ==
Italy.
