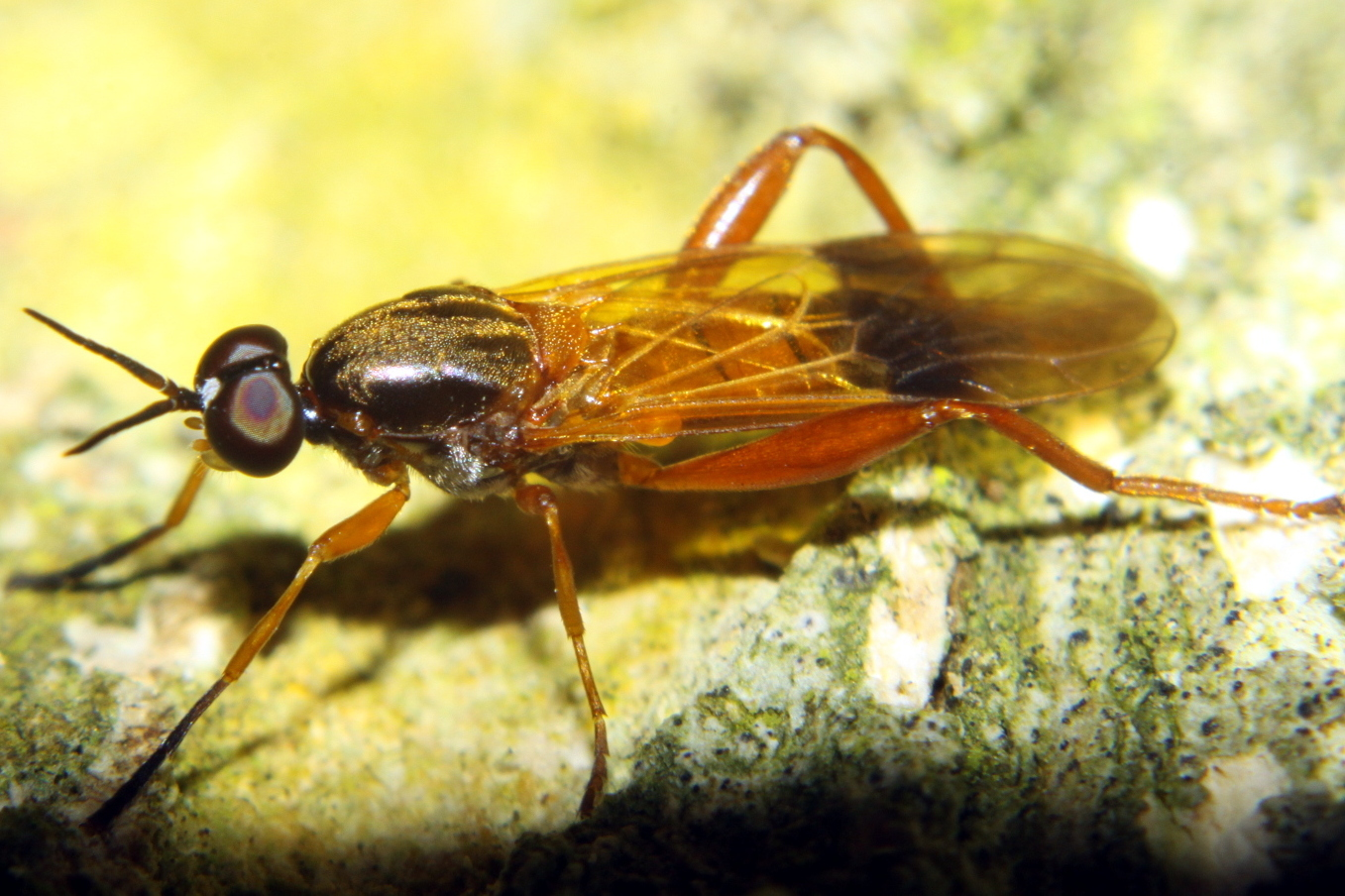

Scientific classification
- Kingdom: Animalia
- Phylum: Arthropoda
- Class: Insecta
- Order: Diptera
- Family: Stratiomyidae
- Subfamily: Beridinae
- Genus: Benhamyia
- Species: B. apicalis

Binomial name
- Benhamyia apicalis Walker, 1849

Synonyms
- Diphysa apicalis Walker, 1849; Exaireta analis Nowicki, 1875

= Benhamyia apicalis =

Species of fly

Benhamyia apicalis is a species of soldier fly described by Francis Walker in 1849, who originally called the species Diphysa apicalis. It is endemic to New Zealand.

== Description ==
Walker's original 1849 description is as follows:

Head black, hoary in front: eyes pitchy-black; facets of the fore feet rather larger than those elsewhere: palpi and sucker tawny; second joint of the palpi spindle-shaped, not broader than the first: feelers black, filiform, dark red towards the base, nearly as long as the chest: chest and breast dark purple; chest adorned with golden down, which forms three stripes; scutcheon tawny, armed with four teeth: abdomen tawny, a little narrower than the chest and nearly twice its length, slightly decreasing in breadth from the base to the tip, which is purple: legs tawny; hind legs long, their thighs club-shaped; fore feet pitchy: wings colourless on the disk, tawny along the fore border, gray along the hind border and at the tip, adorned with a blackish band which does not reach the hind border; wing-ribs and veins tawny; veins pitchy on the blackish band; poisers pale yellow. Length of the body 3 1/2 lines; of the wings 7 lines.

== Distribution ==
The species is endemic to New Zealand, found on both the North Island and South Island.

== Gallery ==
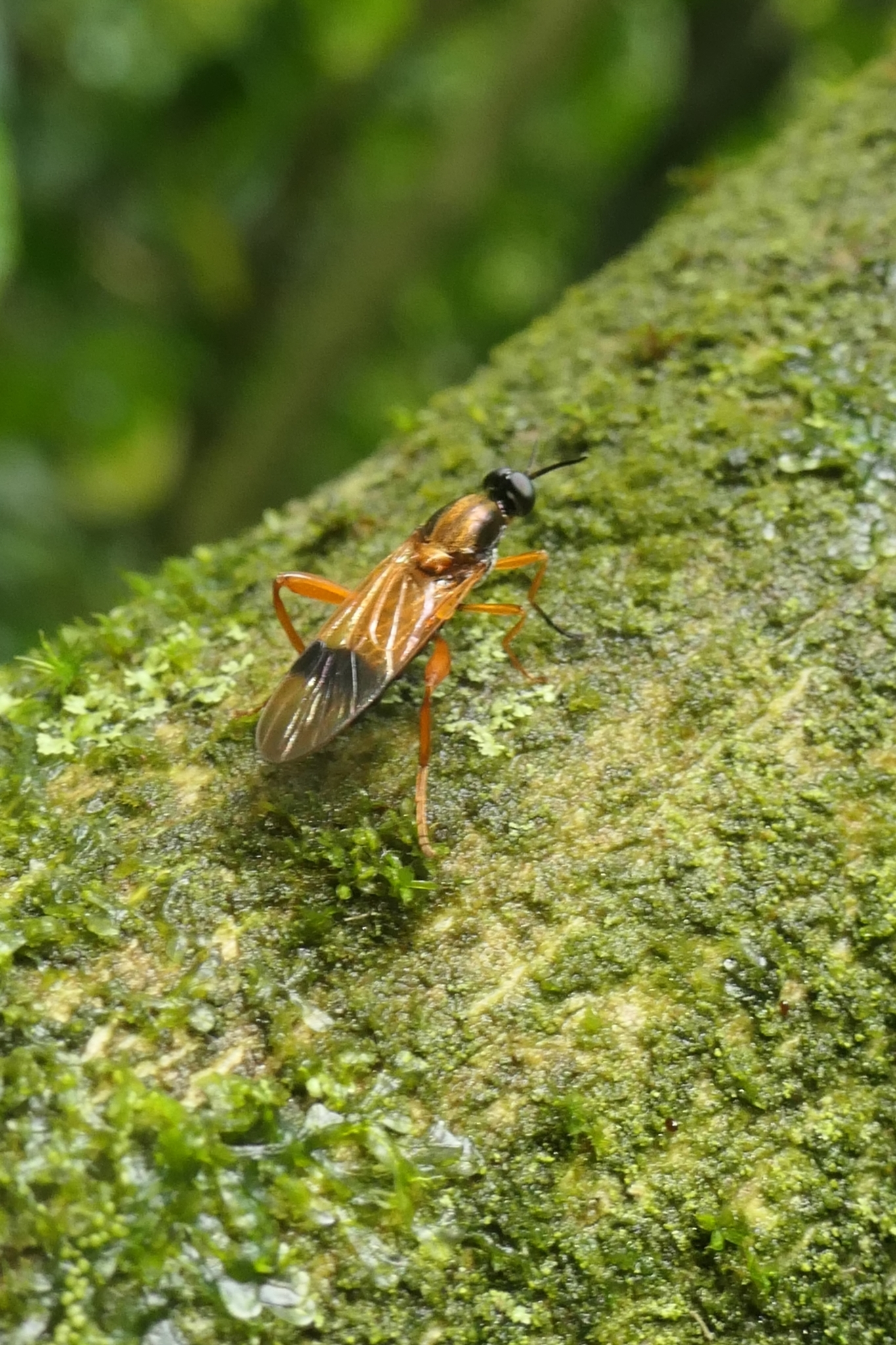
Benhamyia apicalis on a tree in Christchurch

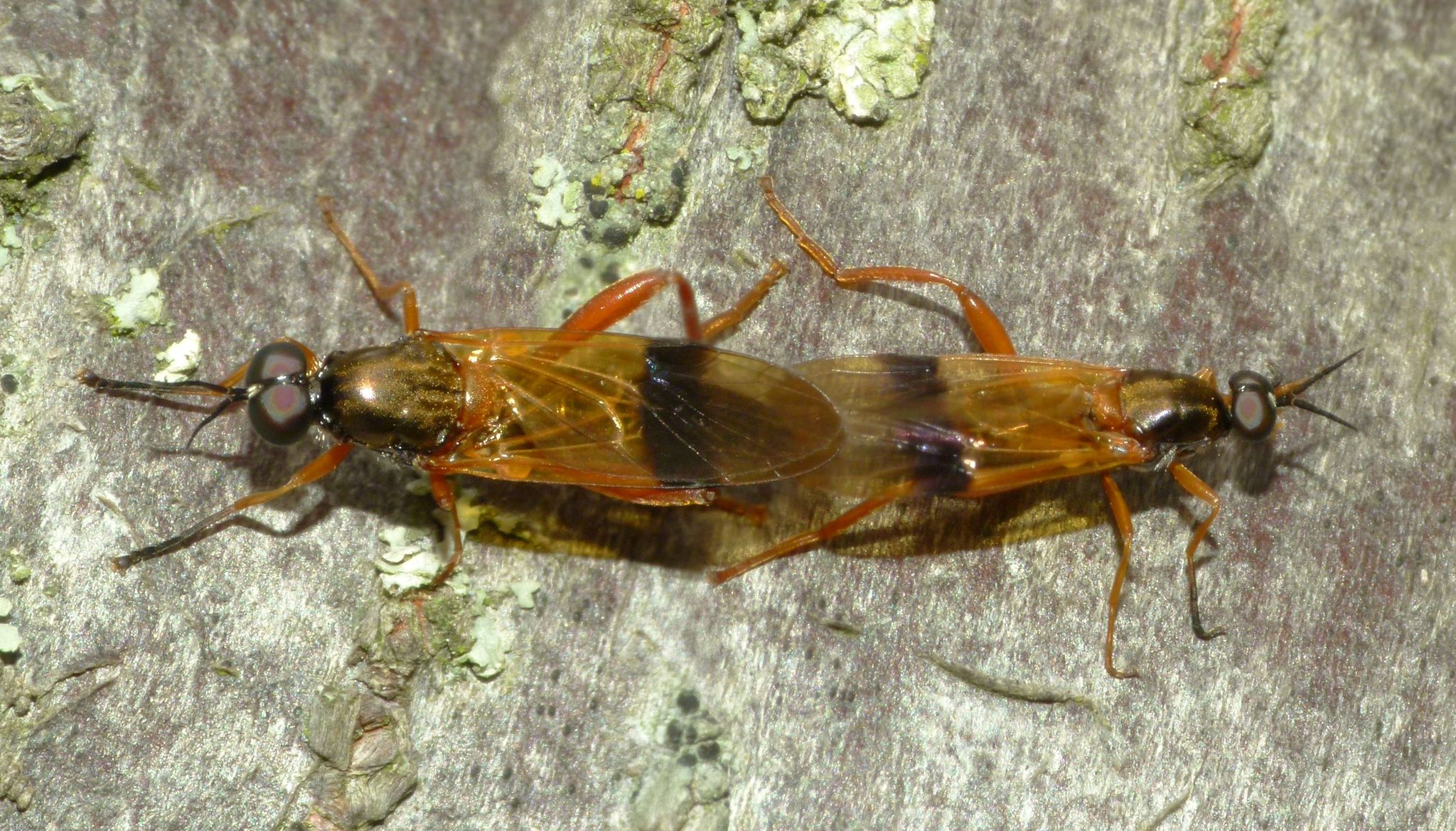
Two Benhamyia apicalis mating in Dunedin

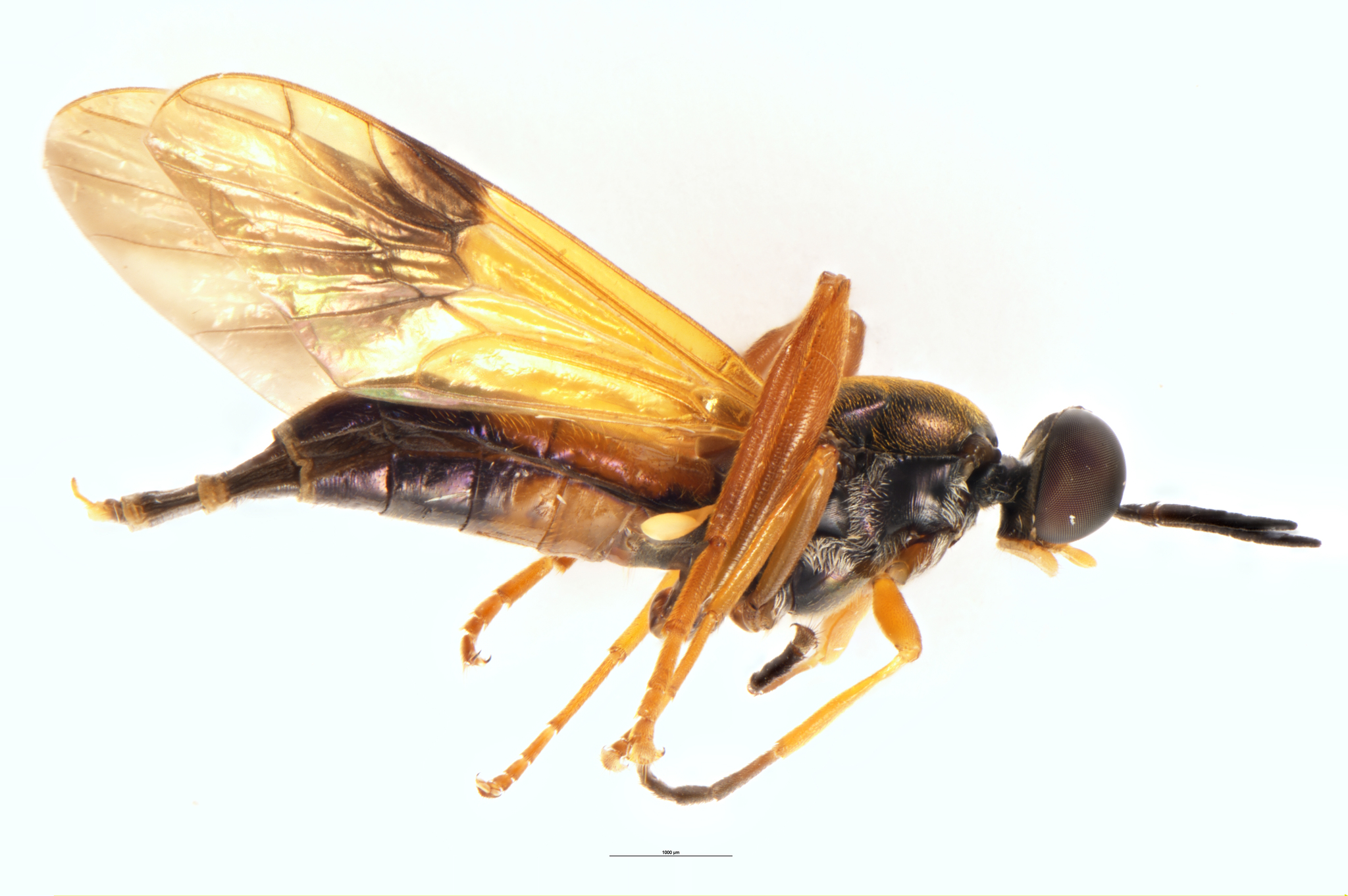
Specimen from Lincoln

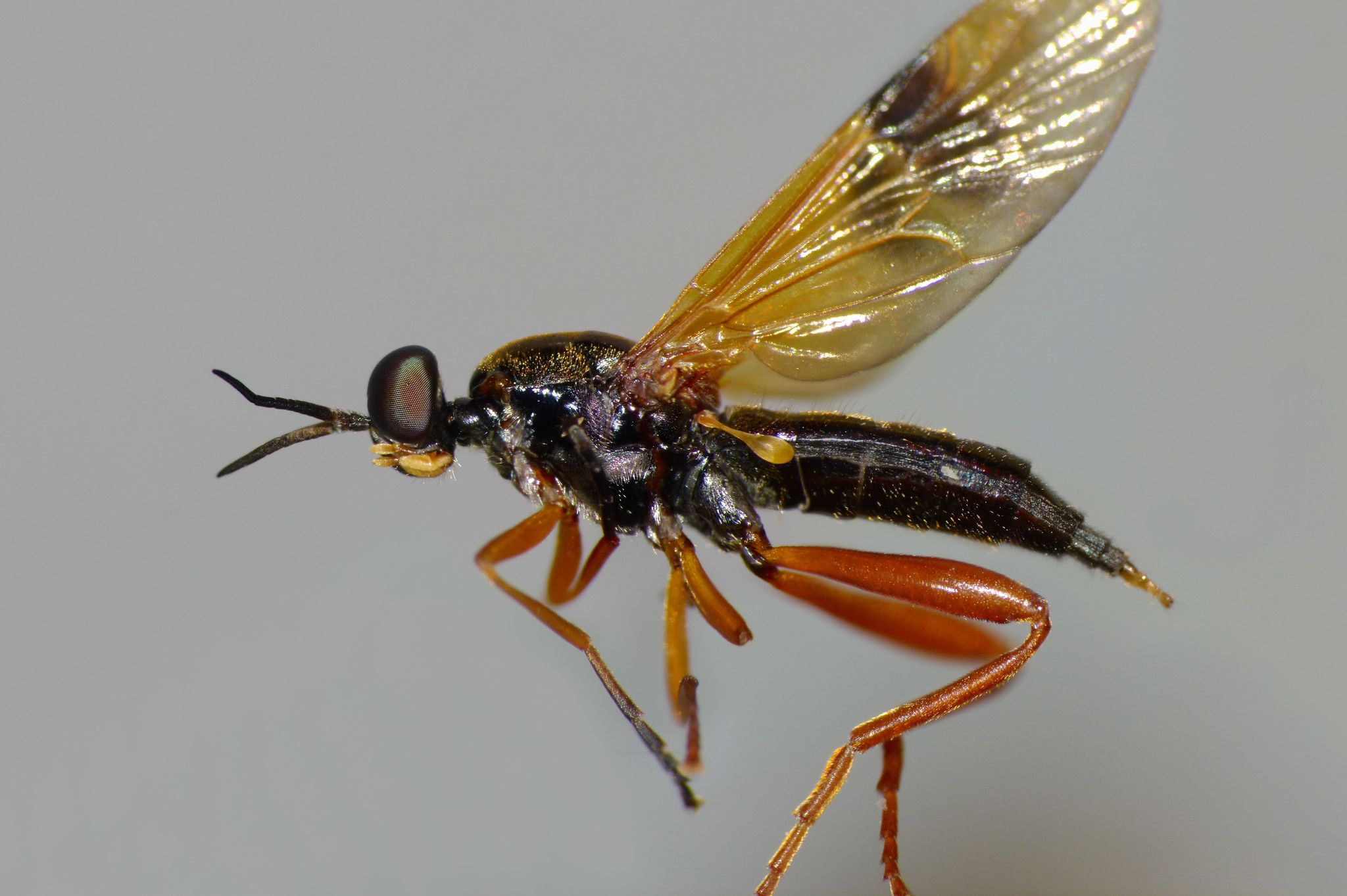
Specimen from Dunedin

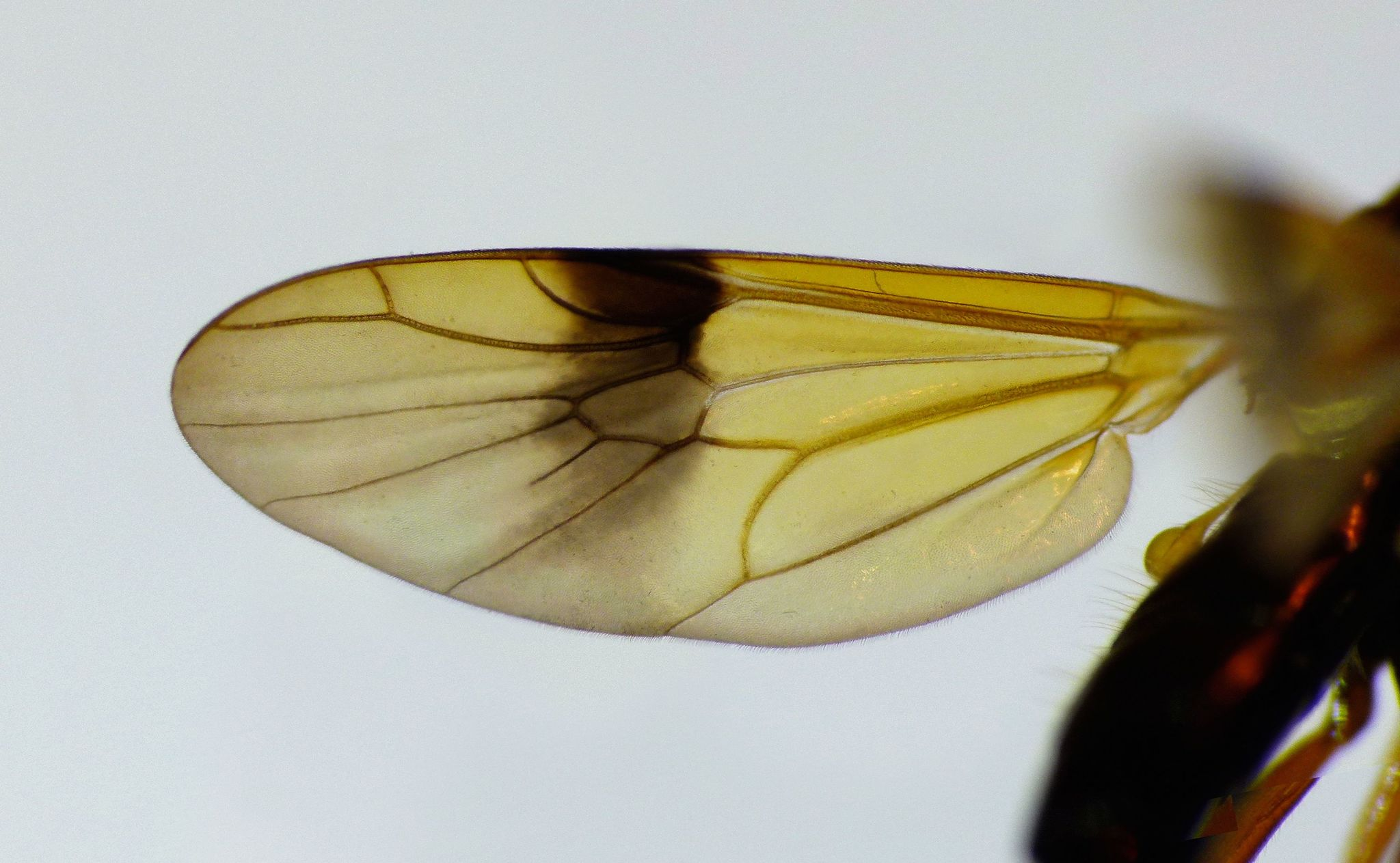
Close-up of the wings of Benhamyia apicalis
