= Chorisops marginata =

Scientific classification
- Kingdom: Animalia
- Phylum: Arthropoda
- Class: Insecta
- Order: Diptera
- Family: Stratiomyidae
- Subfamily: Beridinae
- Genus: Chorisops
- Species: C. marginata

Binomial name
- Chorisops marginata Frey, 1961

Species of fly

Chorisops marginata, is a species of soldier fly.

== Distribution ==
Myanmar.
