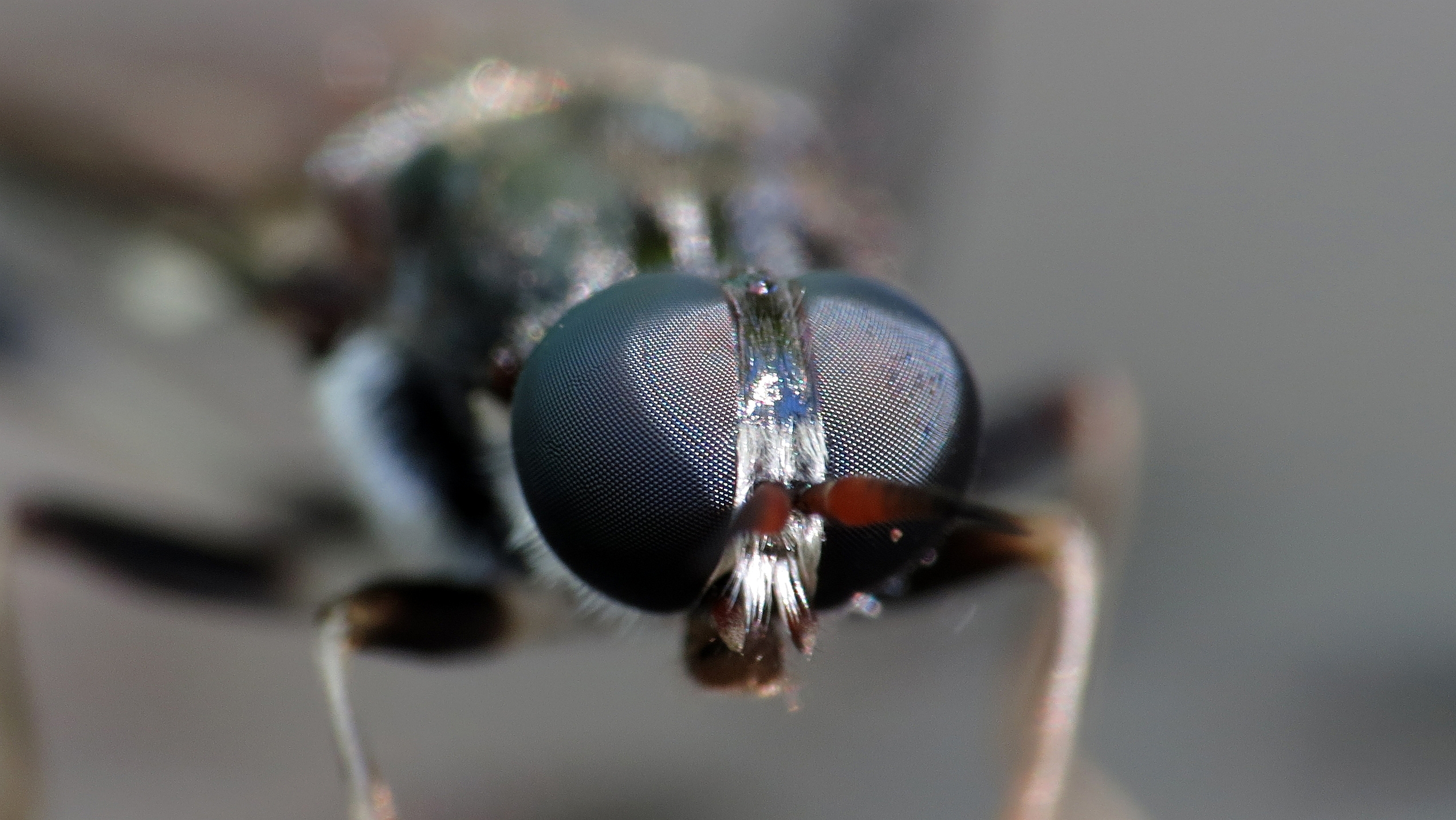

Scientific classification
- Kingdom: Animalia
- Phylum: Arthropoda
- Clade: Pancrustacea
- Class: Insecta
- Order: Diptera
- Family: Stratiomyidae
- Subfamily: Beridinae
- Genus: Exaireta
- Species: E. spinigera

Binomial name
- Exaireta spinigera (Wiedemann, 1830)

Synonyms
- Beris albimacula Walker, 1848; Beris servillei Macquart, 1838; Xylophagus spinigera Wiedemann, 1830

= Exaireta spinigera =

Species of fly

Exaireta spinigera commonly known as the garden soldier fly or blue soldier fly. The species is a part of the Stratiomyidae family. The originally described holotype of the species was kept in the Berlin Museum and was discovered when Australia was still referred to as New Holland. The original taxonomic description of the species requires translation from German using the Fraktur alphabet.

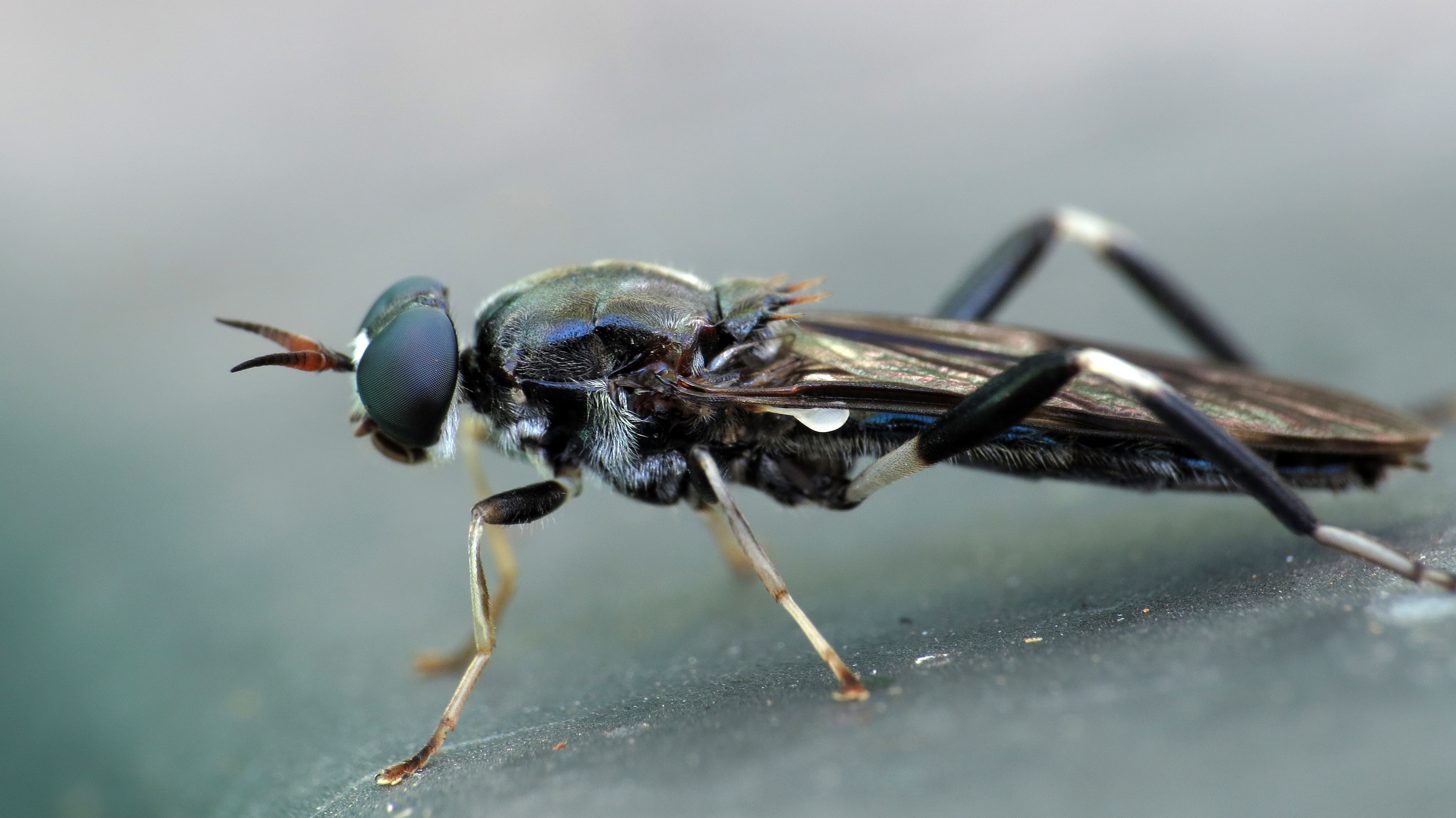
Garden soldier fly, Exaireta spinigera

== Description ==
Exaireta spinigera has an elongated abdomen with four yellow-tipped spikes that protrude from the scutellum, found near the thorax. It is black with violet undertones and shaded wings. The abdomen is also characterized by a metallic shine like other members of the Stratiomyidae family. Exaireta spinigera also sports typical Stratiomyidae antennae which are composed of three distinctive segments.

The length of the fly has been recorded between 14mm and 16mm. Historically it was noted the males were 9-10mm long with a 7-8mm wing length and females 13-15mm with an 11-12mm wing length. Both the larvae and fly form of Exaireta spinigera have a flattened-shaped body, which is also typical of the Stratiomyidae family but no other sources could be found describing the morphology of the larvae or eggs.

== Range ==
=== Natural global range ===
Exaireta spinigera is native to Australia but has been introduced to many different regions including New Zealand, Hawaii, North America, Europe, and Russia.

It was first found in Honolulu, Hawaii in the 1890s and became commonly spread by the 1900s. It was later found in North America, in Santa Barbara, California in 1985. In Europe, it has been spreading throughout Italy and while it was first recorded in the Italian Peninsula, it has since been found in France. Exaireta spinigera was also most recently discovered on the Black Sea coast in Alder, Russia. The species has a widespread distribution and is likely in other countries not mentioned.

=== New Zealand range ===
Exaireta spinigera has been found throughout both islands of New Zealand. The furthest south it was recorded was Papatowai and the most northern was Pupuke. It has been historically found in Auckland, Whangārei and Wellington as part of its known habitat.

== Habitat ==
The larvae of Exaireta spinigera prefer living in decaying organic matter and are commonly associated with residential compost bins. The adult garden soldier fly also prefers and is often found hovering around decaying organic matter. They are commonly seen around residential gardens.

== Ecology ==
=== Life cycle/Phenology ===
Exaireta spinigera has been noticed in Australia to have a seasonal pattern where activity and sightings peak in Autumn and Spring. The peak starts in April but the species is most active between March and May and is shown to have another activity peak between September and December. The species is also diurnal.

There is a preference for eggs to be laid directly into substrate such as decaying organic matter but not much is known about the rearing, lifecycle and mating behaviour of Exaireta spinigera. The pupa of Stratiomydiae is formed inside the larval skin which does not change during the process. It was assumed that when conditions were too moist the larvae of Exaireta spinigera sought out drier locations to pupate but were not able to be observed. There is no current literature on the life cycle, mating and rearing behavior of the species.

=== Diet and foraging ===
Stratiomyidae is a family of detrivores. Exaireta spinigera has been studied to see its effectiveness as a bioconvertor of food waste as the larvae consumes detritus. It is assumed that pollen and nectar may be a potential food source for adults.

=== Predators, Parasites, and Diseases ===
Predators of Exaireta spinigera include Vespula germanica, the German wasp, Trite planiceps, and the black-headed jumping spider. Female praying mantis nymphs Miomantis caffra predate on the larvae stage Exareita spinigera and Dactylosternum abdominale, a water beetle predates on both egg and larvae of Exaireta spinigera.
