= Australoactina silvicola =

Scientific classification
- Kingdom: Animalia
- Phylum: Arthropoda
- Clade: Pancrustacea
- Class: Insecta
- Order: Diptera
- Family: Stratiomyidae
- Subfamily: Beridinae
- Genus: Australoactina
- Species: A. silvicola

Binomial name
- Australoactina silvicola (Hardy, 1932)

Synonyms
- Actina silvicola Hardy, 1932

Species of soldier fly

Australoactina silvicola is a species of soldier fly in the family Stratiomyidae. It was first described by George Hudleston Hurlstone Hardy in 1932 as Actina silvicola.

== Taxonomy ==
Actina silvicola is treated as a synonym of Australoactina silvicola by GBIF. The species is placed in Australoactina, a genus of flies in the subfamily Beridinae.

== Distribution ==
Australoactina silvicola is known from Australia.
