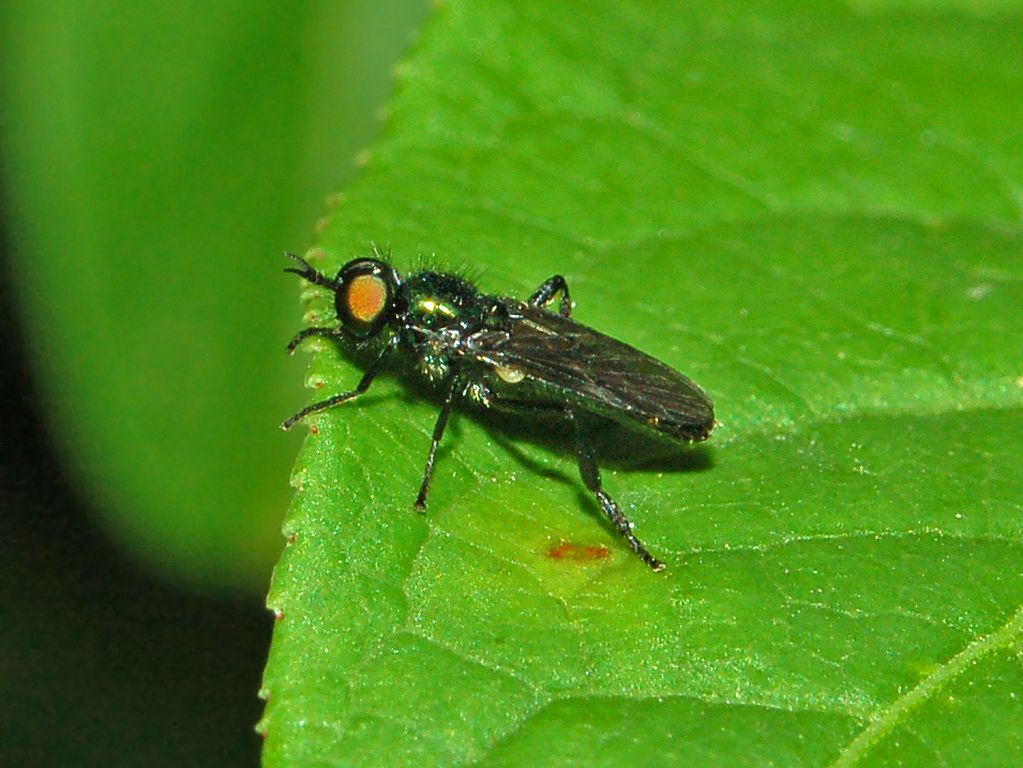
- Actina chalybea, male

Scientific classification
- Kingdom: Animalia
- Phylum: Arthropoda
- Class: Insecta
- Order: Diptera
- Family: Stratiomyidae
- Subfamily: Beridinae
- Genus: Actina
- Species: A. chalybea

Binomial name
- Actina chalybea Meigen, 1804

Synonyms
- Beris femoralis Meigen, 1820; Beris hirsuta Macquart, 1834; Beris nigripes Meigen, 1820; Beris nitens Latreille, 1905; Beris octodentata Meigen, 1820

= Actina chalybea =

Species of fly

Actina chalybea is a species of 'soldier flies' belonging to the family Stratiomyidae subfamily Beridinae.

== Distribution ==
This species is present in most of Europe. Adults prefer shady and moist habitats.

== Description ==
The adults of Actina chalybea ca reach a length of 7.5–8.5 millimetres (0.30–0.33 in) long. These flies have a metallic green thorax. The head is quite large and rounded, with small black antennae pointing forward. Palps are clearly visible. The eyes are green, almost contiguous in males and clearly separated in females. Forehead and thorax are covered with long black hair. The scutellum has four black spines. The abdomen is flattened and the legs are black with femora partially yellow.

== Biology ==
Adults can mostly be encountered from April through June.

== Bibliography ==
- Keith Bayless - Actina species
- Rozkošný, R. 1998. Chapter 24. Family Stratiomyidae. Manual Palaearct. Dipt. 2: 387–411.
