= Chorisops maculiala =

Scientific classification
- Kingdom: Animalia
- Phylum: Arthropoda
- Class: Insecta
- Order: Diptera
- Family: Stratiomyidae
- Subfamily: Beridinae
- Genus: Chorisops
- Species: C. maculiala

Binomial name
- Chorisops maculiala Nagatomi, 1964

Species of fly

Chorisops maculiala is a species of soldier fly.

== Distribution ==
Japan.
