= Australoactina incisuralis =

Scientific classification
- Kingdom: Animalia
- Phylum: Arthropoda
- Clade: Pancrustacea
- Class: Insecta
- Order: Diptera
- Family: Stratiomyidae
- Subfamily: Beridinae
- Genus: Australoactina
- Species: A. incisuralis

Binomial name
- Australoactina incisuralis (Macquart, 1847)

Synonyms
- Beris incisuralis Macquart, 1847; Beris filipalpis Macquart, 1850; Beris fusciventris Macquart, 1850; Beris nitidithorax Macquart, 1850; Actina victoriae Hill, 1919

Species of soldier fly

Australoactina incisuralis is a species of soldier fly in the family Stratiomyidae. It was first described by Pierre-Justin-Marie Macquart in 1847 as Beris incisuralis.

== Distribution ==
Australoactina incisuralis is known from Australia.
