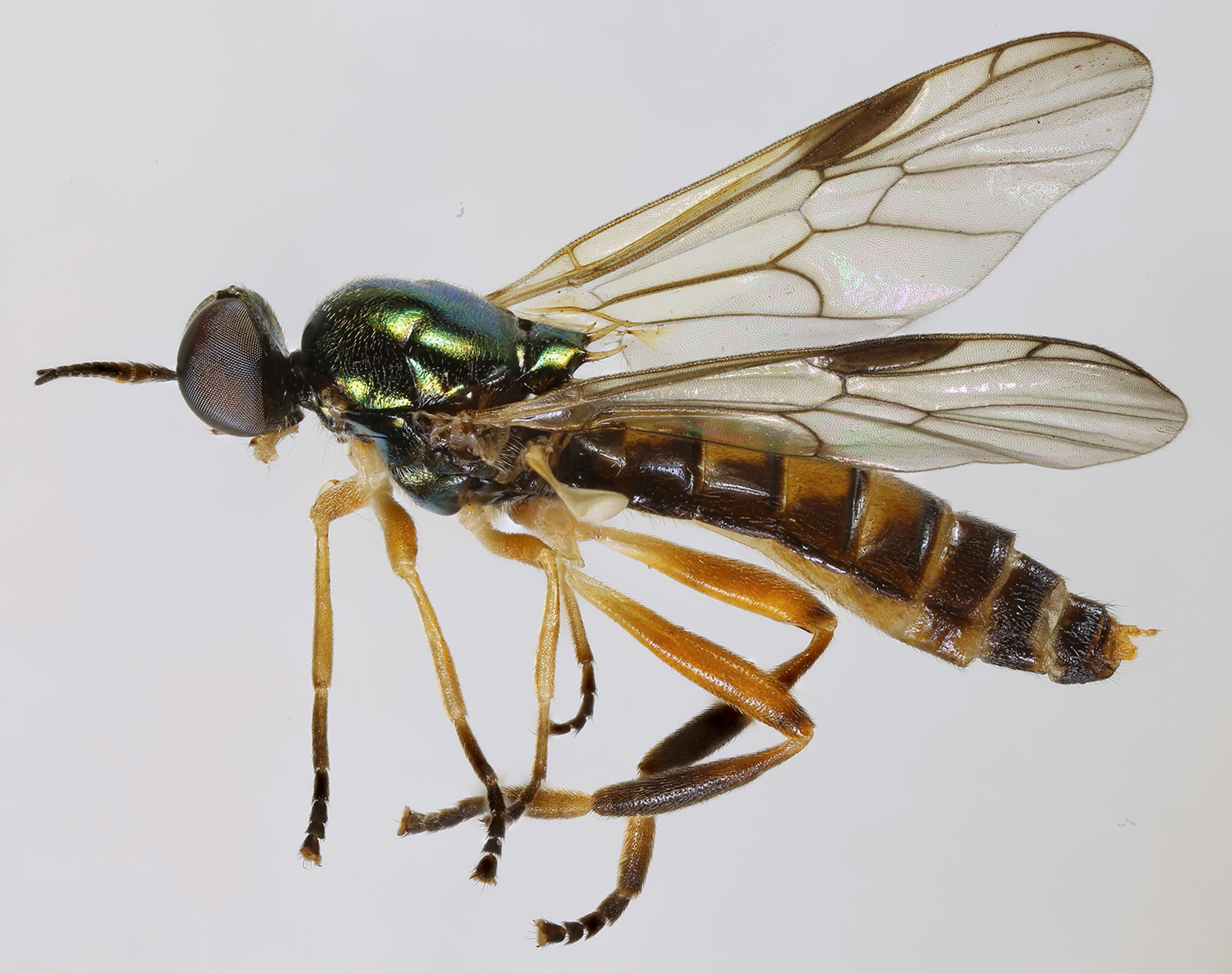
- Chorisops tibialis Graig-fechan, North Wales

Scientific classification
- Kingdom: Animalia
- Phylum: Arthropoda
- Class: Insecta
- Order: Diptera
- Family: Stratiomyidae
- Subfamily: Beridinae
- Genus: Chorisops
- Species: C. tibialis

Binomial name
- Chorisops tibialis (Meigen, 1820)

Synonyms
- Beris tibialis Meigen, 1820; Actina hyaliniventris Costa, 1857; Actina hyalientris Brunetti, 1923

= Chorisops tibialis =

Species of fly

Chorisops tibialis, the dull four-spined legionnaire, is a Palearctic species of soldier fly.

A small (Size 3 to 4 mm.) slender fly. The male has a metallic green thorax and scutellum (both are greenish black in females). The humeri may be yellowish. The scutellum bears four yellow spines. The abdomen in both males and females is yellow (discally) and black at the sides and posteriorly. The male has black and tan banded legs. Females have yellow legs with dark tarsi. The clear wings have dark stigma. The habitat is moist or shaded locations with trees. Males sometimes move in rapidly moving swarms. Adults are found from June to September. The saproxylic larvae are found in decaying wood debris and rot holes in trees.
