= Australoactina ocinis =

Scientific classification
- Kingdom: Animalia
- Phylum: Arthropoda
- Clade: Pancrustacea
- Class: Insecta
- Order: Diptera
- Family: Stratiomyidae
- Subfamily: Beridinae
- Genus: Australoactina
- Species: A. ocinis

Binomial name
- Australoactina ocinis (Hardy, 1932)

Synonyms
- Actina ocinis Hardy, 1932

Species of soldier fly

Australoactina ocinis is a species of soldier fly in the family Stratiomyidae. It was first described by George Hudleston Hurlstone Hardy in 1932 as Actina ocinis.

== Distribution ==
Australoactina ocinis is known from Australia.
