= Australoactina costata =

Scientific classification
- Kingdom: Animalia
- Phylum: Arthropoda
- Clade: Pancrustacea
- Class: Insecta
- Order: Diptera
- Family: Stratiomyidae
- Subfamily: Beridinae
- Genus: Australoactina
- Species: A. costata

Binomial name
- Australoactina costata (White, 1914)

Synonyms
- Actina costata White, 1914

Species of soldier fly

Australoactina costata is a species of soldier fly in the family Stratiomyidae. It was first described by Arthur White in 1914 as Actina costata in a paper on the Diptera-Brachycera of Tasmania.
