= Australoactina nigricornis =

Scientific classification
- Kingdom: Animalia
- Phylum: Arthropoda
- Clade: Pancrustacea
- Class: Insecta
- Order: Diptera
- Family: Stratiomyidae
- Subfamily: Beridinae
- Genus: Australoactina
- Species: A. nigricornis

Binomial name
- Australoactina nigricornis (Enderlein, 1921)

Synonyms
- Actina nigricornis Enderlein, 1921

Species of soldier fly

Australoactina nigricornis is a species of soldier fly in the family Stratiomyidae. It was first described by Günther Enderlein in 1921 as Actina nigricornis.

== Taxonomy ==
Actina nigricornis is treated as a synonym of Australoactina nigricornis by GBIF. The species is placed in Australoactina, a genus of flies in the subfamily Beridinae.

== Distribution ==
Australoactina nigricornis is known from Australia.
