= Australoactina brisbanensis =

Scientific classification
- Kingdom: Animalia
- Phylum: Arthropoda
- Clade: Pancrustacea
- Class: Insecta
- Order: Diptera
- Family: Stratiomyidae
- Subfamily: Beridinae
- Genus: Australoactina
- Species: A. brisbanensis

Binomial name
- Australoactina brisbanensis (Hardy, 1939)

Synonyms
- Actina brisbanensis Hardy, 1939

Species of soldier fly

Australoactina brisbanensis is a species of soldier fly in the family Stratiomyidae. It was first described by George Henry Hardy in 1939 as Actina brisbanensis.

== Distribution ==
Australoactina brisbanensis is found in Australia.
