= Allognosta obscuriventris =

Scientific classification
- Kingdom: Animalia
- Phylum: Arthropoda
- Class: Insecta
- Order: Diptera
- Family: Stratiomyidae
- Subfamily: Beridinae
- Genus: Allognosta
- Species: A. obscuriventris

Binomial name
- Allognosta obscuriventris (Loew, 1863)

Synonyms
- Metoponia obscuriventris Loew, 1863; Metoponia similis Loew, 1863

Species of fly

Allognosta obscuriventris is a species of soldier fly in the family Stratiomyidae.

== Distribution ==
Canada, United States.
