= Berismyia fusca =

Scientific classification
- Kingdom: Animalia
- Phylum: Arthropoda
- Clade: Pancrustacea
- Class: Insecta
- Order: Diptera
- Family: Stratiomyidae
- Subfamily: Beridinae
- Genus: Berismyia
- Species: B. fusca

Binomial name
- Berismyia fusca Giglio-Tos, 1891

Synonyms
- Antissops denticulata Enderlein, 1914

Species of fly

Berismyia fusca is a species in the soldier fly family and the genus Berismyia. The species was described in 1892 by Italian entomologist Ermanno Giglio-Tos.

== Distribution ==
Mexico, Costa Rica.
