= Chorisops masoni =

Scientific classification
- Kingdom: Animalia
- Phylum: Arthropoda
- Clade: Pancrustacea
- Class: Insecta
- Order: Diptera
- Family: Stratiomyidae
- Subfamily: Beridinae
- Genus: Chorisops
- Species: C. masoni

Binomial name
- Chorisops masoni Troiano & Toscano, 1995

Species of fly

Chorisops masoni, is a European species of soldier fly.

== Distribution ==
Italy.
