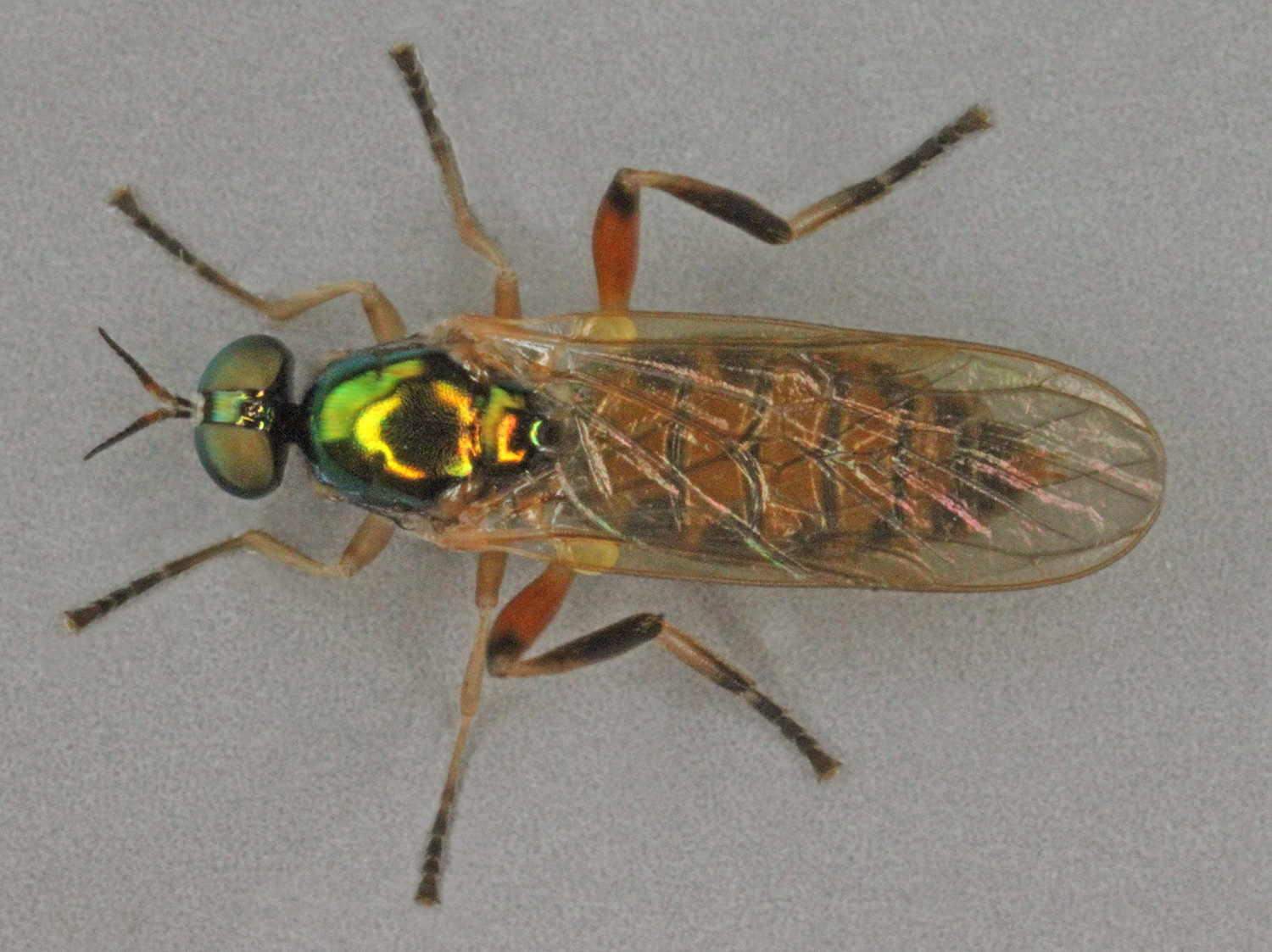
- Chorisops nagatomii Wales

Scientific classification
- Kingdom: Animalia
- Phylum: Arthropoda
- Class: Insecta
- Order: Diptera
- Family: Stratiomyidae
- Subfamily: Beridinae
- Genus: Chorisops
- Species: C. nagatomii

Binomial name
- Chorisops nagatomii Rozkosný, 1979

Synonyms
- Chorisops nagatomi Carles-Tolrá, 1999

= Chorisops nagatomii =

Species of fly

Chorisops nagatomii, the bright four-spined legionnaire, is a European species of soldier fly.

== Distribution ==
England, Austria, Switzerland, E. Europe.
