= Heteracanthia =

Scientific classification
- Kingdom: Animalia
- Phylum: Arthropoda
- Class: Insecta
- Order: Diptera
- Family: Stratiomyidae
- Subfamily: Beridinae
- Genus: Heteracanthia; Macquart, 1850

Type species
- Heteracanthia ruficornis Macquart, 1850

Genus of flies

Heteracanthia is a genus of flies in the family Stratiomyidae.

== Species ==
- Heteracanthia mexicana Giglio-Tos, 1891
- Heteracanthia ruficornis Macquart, 1850
- Heteracanthia violaceiventris Enderlein, 1921
