= Hadrestia =

Scientific classification
- Kingdom: Animalia
- Phylum: Arthropoda
- Class: Insecta
- Order: Diptera
- Family: Stratiomyidae
- Subfamily: Beridinae
- Genus: Hadrestia; Thomson, 1869

Type species
- Hadrestia aenea Thomson, 1869

Genus of flies

Hadrestia is a genus of flies in the family Stratiomyidae.

== Species ==
- Hadrestia aenea Thomson, 1869
- Hadrestia digitata (James, 1975)
