= Australoactina =

Scientific classification
- Kingdom: Animalia
- Phylum: Arthropoda
- Clade: Pancrustacea
- Class: Insecta
- Order: Diptera
- Family: Stratiomyidae
- Subfamily: Beridinae
- Genus: Australoactina; Woodley, 1995

Type species
- Beris incisuralis Macquart, 1847

Genus of flies

Australoactina is a genus of flies in the family Stratiomyidae.

== Species ==
- Australoactina brevihirta (Hardy, 1932)
- Australoactina brisbanensis (Hardy, 1939)
- Australoactina costata (White, 1914)
- Australoactina imperfecta (Hardy, 1932)
- Australoactina incisuralis (Macquart, 1847)
- Australoactina nigricornis (Enderlein, 1921)
- Australoactina ocinis (Hardy, 1932)
- Australoactina silvicola (Hardy, 1932)
