= Actinomyia =

Scientific classification
- Kingdom: Animalia
- Phylum: Arthropoda
- Class: Insecta
- Order: Diptera
- Family: Stratiomyidae
- Subfamily: Beridinae
- Genus: Actinomyia; Lindner, 1949

Type species
- Actinomyia novaeteutoniae Lindner, 1949

Synonyms
- Anapospasma Lindner, 1969

Genus of flies

Actinomyia is a genus of flies in the family Stratiomyidae.

== Species ==
- Actinomyia eupodata (Bigot, 1879)
- Actinomyia longicornis (Schiner, 1868)
- Actinomyia novaeteutoniae Lindner, 1949
