= Zealandoberis =

Scientific classification
- Kingdom: Animalia
- Phylum: Arthropoda
- Class: Insecta
- Order: Diptera
- Family: Stratiomyidae
- Subfamily: Beridinae
- Genus: Zealandoberis; Woodley, 1995

Type species
- Beris violacea Hutton, 1901

Genus of flies

Zealandoberis is a genus of flies in the family Stratiomyidae.

== Species ==
- Zealandoberis lacuans (Miller, 1917)
- Zealandoberis micans (Hutton, 1901)
- Zealandoberis substituta (Walker, 1854)
- Zealandoberis violacea (Hutton, 1901)
