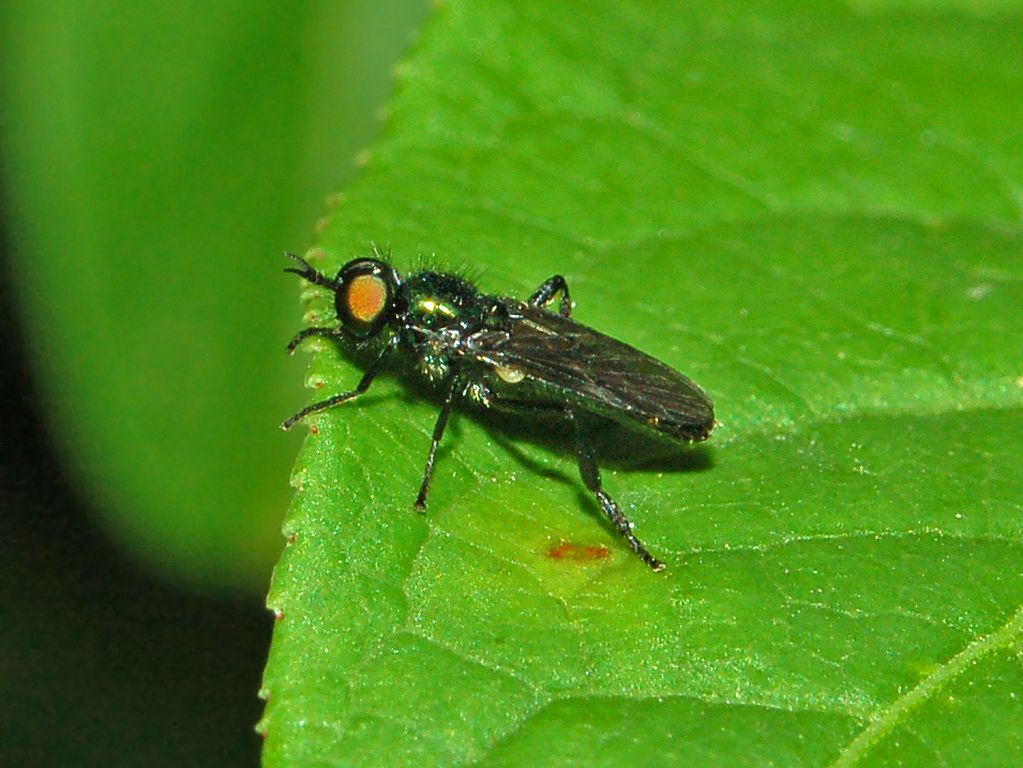
- Actina chalybea, male

Scientific classification
- Kingdom: Animalia
- Phylum: Arthropoda
- Clade: Pancrustacea
- Class: Insecta
- Order: Diptera
- Family: Stratiomyidae
- Subfamily: Beridinae
- Genus: Actina; Meigen, 1804

Type species
- Actina chalybea Meigen, 1804

Synonyms
- Allactina Curran, 1924; Metaberis Lindner, 1936

= Actina =

Genus of flies

Actina is a genus of flies in the family Stratiomyidae.

== Species ==
- Actina acutula Yang & Nagatomi, 1992
- Actina amoena (Enderlein, 1921)
- Actina apicalis (Frey, 1960)
- Actina apiciflava Li, Zhang & Yang, 2009
- Actina basalis Li, Li & Yang, 2011
- Actina bilobata Li, Zhang & Yang, 2009
- Actina bimaculata Yu, Cui & Yang, 2009
- Actina chalybea Meigen, 1804
- Actina compta (Enderlein, 1921)
- Actina curvata Qi, Zhang & Yang, 2011
- Actina diadema Lindner, 1936
- Actina dulongjiangana Li, Cui & Yang, 2009
- Actina elongata Li, Zhang & Yang, 2009
- Actina fanjingshana Li, Zhang & Yang, 2009
- Actina flavicornis (James, 1939)
- Actina fraterna (Frey, 1960)
- Actina gongshana Li, Li & Yang, 2011
- Actina jezoensis (Matsumura, 1916)
- Actina longa Li, Li & Yang, 2011
- Actina maculipennis Yang & Nagatomi, 1992
- Actina nitens ssp. soldatowi Pleske, 1928
- Actina quadrimaculata Li, Zhang & Yang, 2011
- Actina spatulata Yang & Nagatomi, 1992
- Actina tengchongana Li, Li & Yang, 2011
- Actina trimaculata Yu, Cui & Yang, 2009
- Actina unimaculata Yu, Cui & Yang, 2009
- Actina varipes Lindner, 1940
- Actina viridis (Say, 1824)
- Actina xizangensis Yang & Nagatomi, 1992
- Actina yeni Li, Zhang & Yang, 2011
- Actina zhangae Li, Li & Yang, 2011

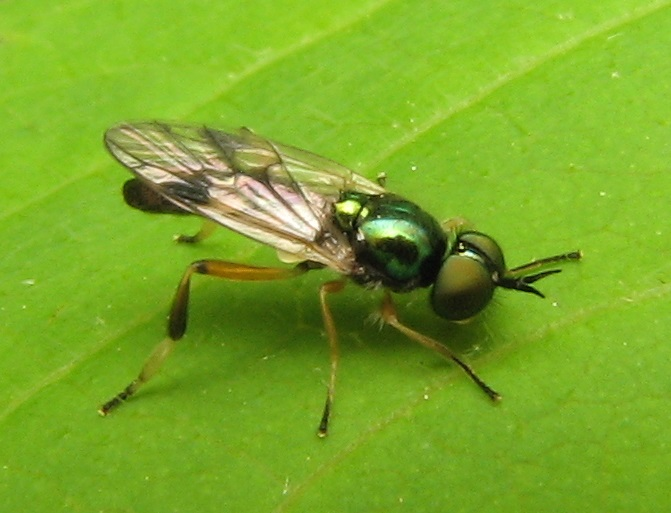
Actina viridis
