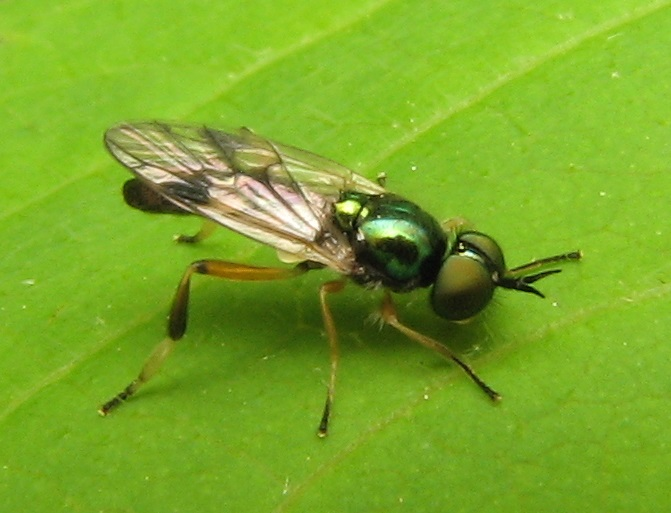

Scientific classification
- Kingdom: Animalia
- Phylum: Arthropoda
- Class: Insecta
- Order: Diptera
- Family: Stratiomyidae
- Subfamily: Beridinae
- Genus: Actina
- Species: A. viridis

Binomial name
- Actina viridis (Say, 1824)

Synonyms
- Actina obscuripes Johnson, 1926; Actina viridis var. obscuripes Johnson, 1926; Beris viridis Say, 182

= Actina viridis =

Species of fly

Actina viridis is a species of soldier fly in the family Stratiomyidae.

== Distribution ==
Canada, United States.
