= Macromeracis =

Scientific classification
- Kingdom: Animalia
- Phylum: Arthropoda
- Class: Insecta
- Order: Diptera
- Family: Stratiomyidae
- Subfamily: Beridinae
- Genus: Macromeracis; Enderlein, 1921

Type species
- Beris thoracica Philippi, 1865

Synonyms
- Macromeris Arnaud, 1979; Neochorisops Lindner, 1935

Genus of flies

Macromeracis is a genus of flies in the family Stratiomyidae.

== Species ==
- Macromeracis brasiliensis (Lindner, 1935)
- Macromeracis elongata Aubertin, 1930
- Macromeracis engeli (Lindner, 1943)
- Macromeracis epsilon James, 1975
- Macromeracis erecta James, 1975
- Macromeracis hirtiforceps James, 1975
- Macromeracis luteiventris (Philippi, 1865)
- Macromeracis mima James, 1975
- Macromeracis modesta (Philippi, 1865)
- Macromeracis nana James, 1975
- Macromeracis nordenholzi (Lindner, 1943)
- Macromeracis penai James, 1975
- Macromeracis philippii (Rondani, 1863)
- Macromeracis plaumanni (Lindner, 1949)
- Macromeracis reedi James, 1975
- Macromeracis schlingeri James, 1975
- Macromeracis similis (Enderlein, 1921)
- Macromeracis thoracica (Philippi, 1865)
- Macromeracis trigonifera James, 1975
- Macromeracis viridiventris (Philippi, 1865)
