= Mischomedia =

Scientific classification
- Kingdom: Animalia
- Phylum: Arthropoda
- Class: Insecta
- Order: Diptera
- Family: Stratiomyidae
- Subfamily: Beridinae
- Genus: Mischomedia; Woodley, 1995

Type species
- Mischomedia queenslandica Woodley, 1995

Genus of flies

Mischomedia is a genus of flies in the family Stratiomyidae.

== Species ==
- Mischomedia queenslandica Woodley, 1995
