= Arcuavena =

Scientific classification
- Kingdom: Animalia
- Phylum: Arthropoda
- Class: Insecta
- Order: Diptera
- Family: Stratiomyidae
- Subfamily: Beridinae
- Genus: Arcuavena; Woodley, 1995

Genus of flies

Arcuavena is a genus of flies in the family Stratiomyidae.

== Species ==
- Arcuavena barbiellinii (Bezzi, 1908)
- Arcuavena bezzii (Lindner, 1949)
- Arcuavena limbata (Bigot, 1879)
- Arcuavena limbativentris (Enderlein, 1921)
- Arcuavena nigerrima (Lindner, 1949)
- Arcuavena singularis (Macquart, 1846)
