= Microhadrestia =

Scientific classification
- Kingdom: Animalia
- Phylum: Arthropoda
- Class: Insecta
- Order: Diptera
- Family: Stratiomyidae
- Subfamily: Beridinae
- Genus: Microhadrestia; Lindner, 1943

Type species
- Microhadrestia minuta Lindner, 1943

Genus of flies

Microhadrestia is a genus of flies in the family Stratiomyidae.

== Species ==
- Microhadrestia minuta Lindner, 1943
