= Eumecacis =

Scientific classification
- Kingdom: Animalia
- Phylum: Arthropoda
- Clade: Pancrustacea
- Class: Insecta
- Order: Diptera
- Family: Stratiomyidae
- Subfamily: Beridinae
- Genus: Eumecacis; Enderlein, 1921

Type species
- Eumecacis clavigera Enderlein, 1921

Genus of flies

Eumecacis is a genus of flies in the family Stratiomyidae.

== Species ==
- Eumecacis clavigera Enderlein, 1921
