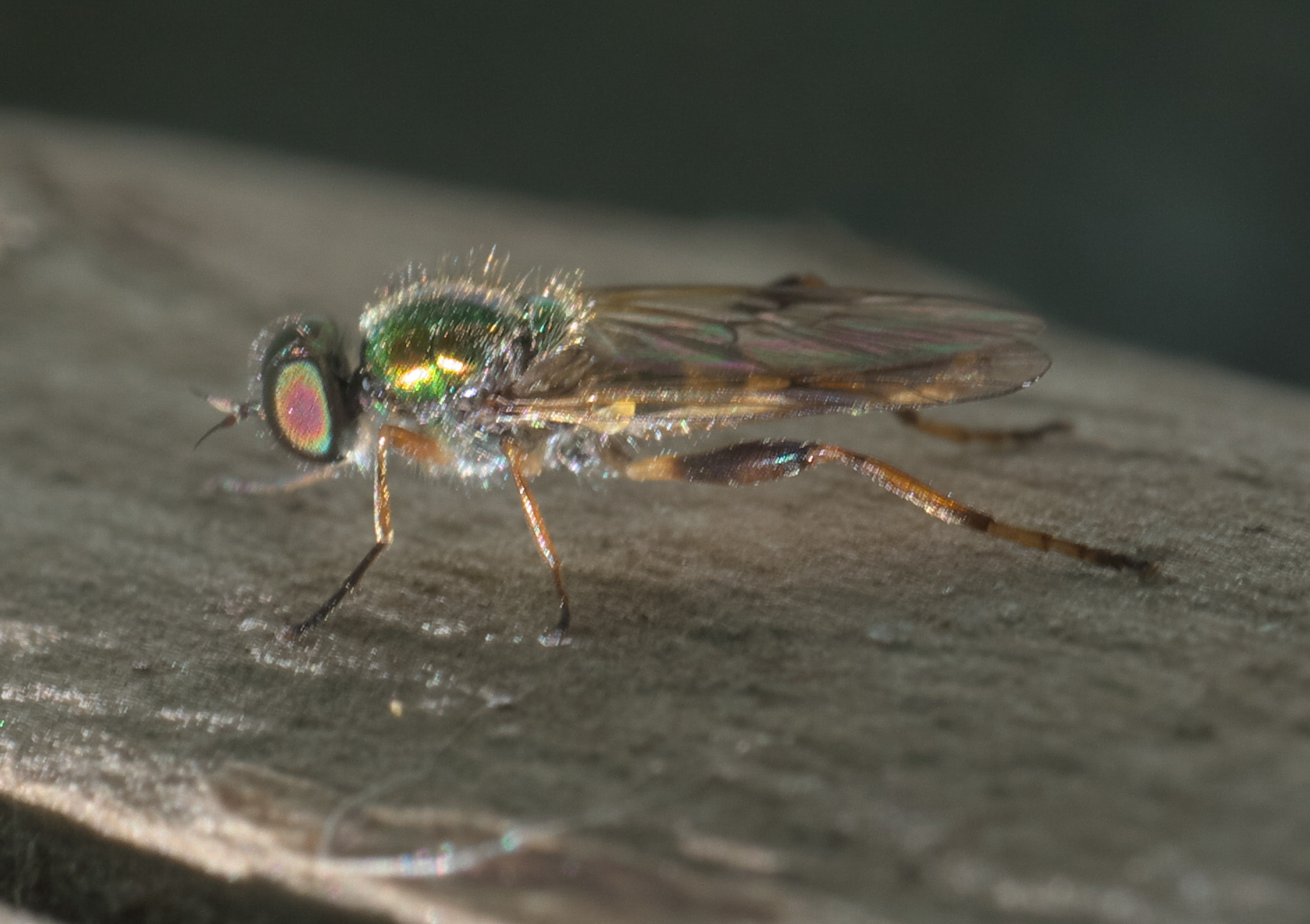
- Neactina sp.

Scientific classification
- Kingdom: Animalia
- Phylum: Arthropoda
- Class: Insecta
- Order: Diptera
- Family: Stratiomyidae
- Subfamily: Beridinae
- Genus: Neactina; Enderlein, 1921

Type species
- Actina opposita Walker, 1854)

= Neactina =

Genus of flies

Neactina is a genus of flies in the family Stratiomyidae.

== Species ==
- Neactina opposita (Walker, 1854)
- Neactina ostensackeni (Lindner, 1958)
- Neactina simmondsii (Miller, 1917)
