= Beridops =

Scientific classification
- Kingdom: Animalia
- Phylum: Arthropoda
- Class: Insecta
- Order: Diptera
- Family: Stratiomyidae
- Subfamily: Beridinae
- Genus: Beridops; Enderlein, 1913

Type species
- Beris trichonota Philippi, 1865

Genus of flies

Beridops is a genus of flies in the family Stratiomyidae.

== Species ==
- Beridops abdominalis James, 1973
- Beridops maculipennis (Blanchard, 1854)
- Beridops nigripes James, 1973
- Beridops penai James, 1973
