= Berismyia =

Scientific classification
- Kingdom: Animalia
- Phylum: Arthropoda
- Class: Insecta
- Order: Diptera
- Family: Stratiomyidae
- Subfamily: Beridinae
- Genus: Berismyia; Giglio-Tos, 1891

Type species
- Berismyia fusca Giglio-Tos, 1893

Synonyms
- Antissops Enderlein, 1914

Genus of flies

Berismyia is a genus of flies in the family Stratiomyidae.

== Species ==
- Berismyia fusca Giglio-Tos, 1893
- Berismyia nigrofemorata Williston, 1900
