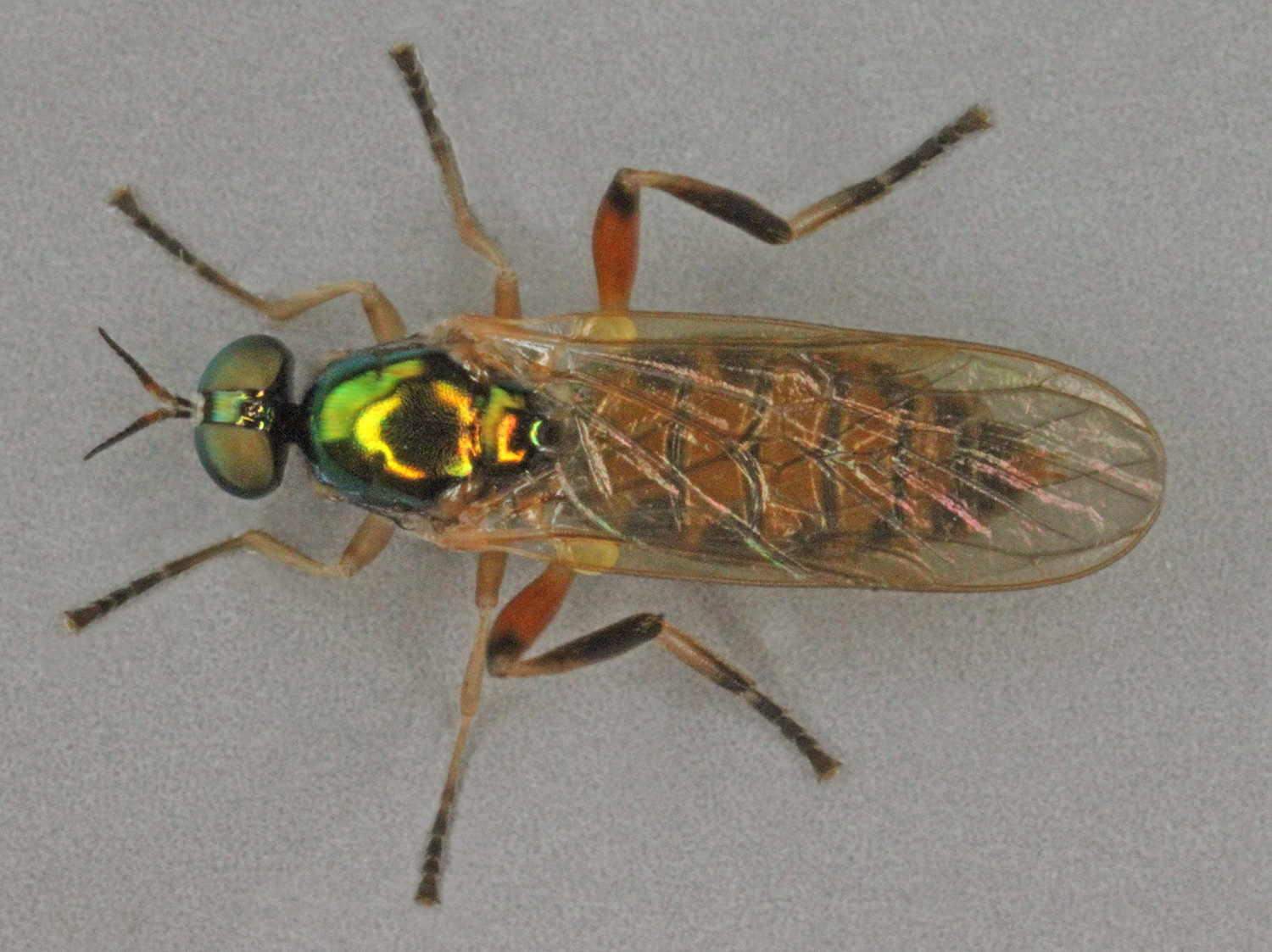
- Chorisops nagatomii

Scientific classification
- Kingdom: Animalia
- Phylum: Arthropoda
- Class: Insecta
- Order: Diptera
- Family: Stratiomyidae
- Subfamily: Beridinae
- Genus: Chorisops; Rondani, 1856

Type species
- Beris tibialis Meigen, 1820

Synonyms
- Chorisosps Róndani, 1856; Chrosisops Frey, 1961; Corisops Bigot, 1857; Chlorisops Szilády, 1932

= Chorisops =

Genus of flies

Chorisops is a genus of flies in the family Stratiomyidae.

== Species ==
- Chorisops bilobata Li, Cui & Yang, 2009
- Chorisops brevis Li, Cui & Yang, 2009
- Chorisops caroli Troiano, 1995
- Chorisops fanjingshana Li, Cui & Yang, 2009
- Chorisops longa Li, Zhang & Yang, 2009
- Chorisops maculiala Nagatomi, 1964
- Chorisops marginata Frey, 1960
- Chorisops masoni Troiano & Toscano, 1995
- Chorisops nagatomii Rozkošný, 1979
- Chorisops separata Yang & Nagatomi, 1992
- Chorisops striata Qi, Zhang & Yang, 2011
- Chorisops tianmushana Li, Zhang & Yang, 2009
- Chorisops tibialis (Meigen, 1820)
- Chorisops tunisiae (Becker, 1915)
- Chorisops unita Yang & Nagatomi, 1992
- Chorisops zhangae Li, Zhang & Yang, 2009
