= Anexaireta =

Scientific classification
- Kingdom: Animalia
- Phylum: Arthropoda
- Class: Insecta
- Order: Diptera
- Family: Stratiomyidae
- Subfamily: Beridinae
- Genus: Anexaireta; Woodley, 1995

Type species
- Exaireta hyacinthina Bigot, 1879

Genus of flies

Anexaireta is a genus of flies in the family Stratiomyidae.

== Species ==
- Anexaireta castanea (James, 1975)
- Anexaireta gracilis (James, 1975)
- Anexaireta hyacinthina (Bigot, 1879)
- Anexaireta lateralis (James, 1975)
- Anexaireta solvoides (James, 1975)
- Anexaireta therevoides (James, 1975)
- Anexaireta variicolor (James, 1975)
