= Draymonia =

Scientific classification
- Kingdom: Animalia
- Phylum: Arthropoda
- Class: Insecta
- Order: Diptera
- Family: Stratiomyidae
- Subfamily: Beridinae
- Genus: Draymonia; Aubertin, 1932

Type species
- Chilota nitida Aubertin, 1930

Synonyms
- Chilota Aubertin, 1930

Genus of flies

Draymonia is a genus of flies in the family Stratiomyidae.

== Species ==
- Draymonia nitida (Aubertin, 1930)
