= Exaeretina =

Scientific classification
- Kingdom: Animalia
- Phylum: Arthropoda
- Clade: Pancrustacea
- Class: Insecta
- Order: Diptera
- Family: Stratiomyidae
- Subfamily: Beridinae
- Genus: Exaeretina; Enderlein, 1921

Type species
- Exaeretina auricoma Enderlein, 1921

Genus of flies

Exaeretina is a genus of flies in the family Stratiomyidae.

== Species ==
- Exaeretina auricoma Enderlein, 1921
