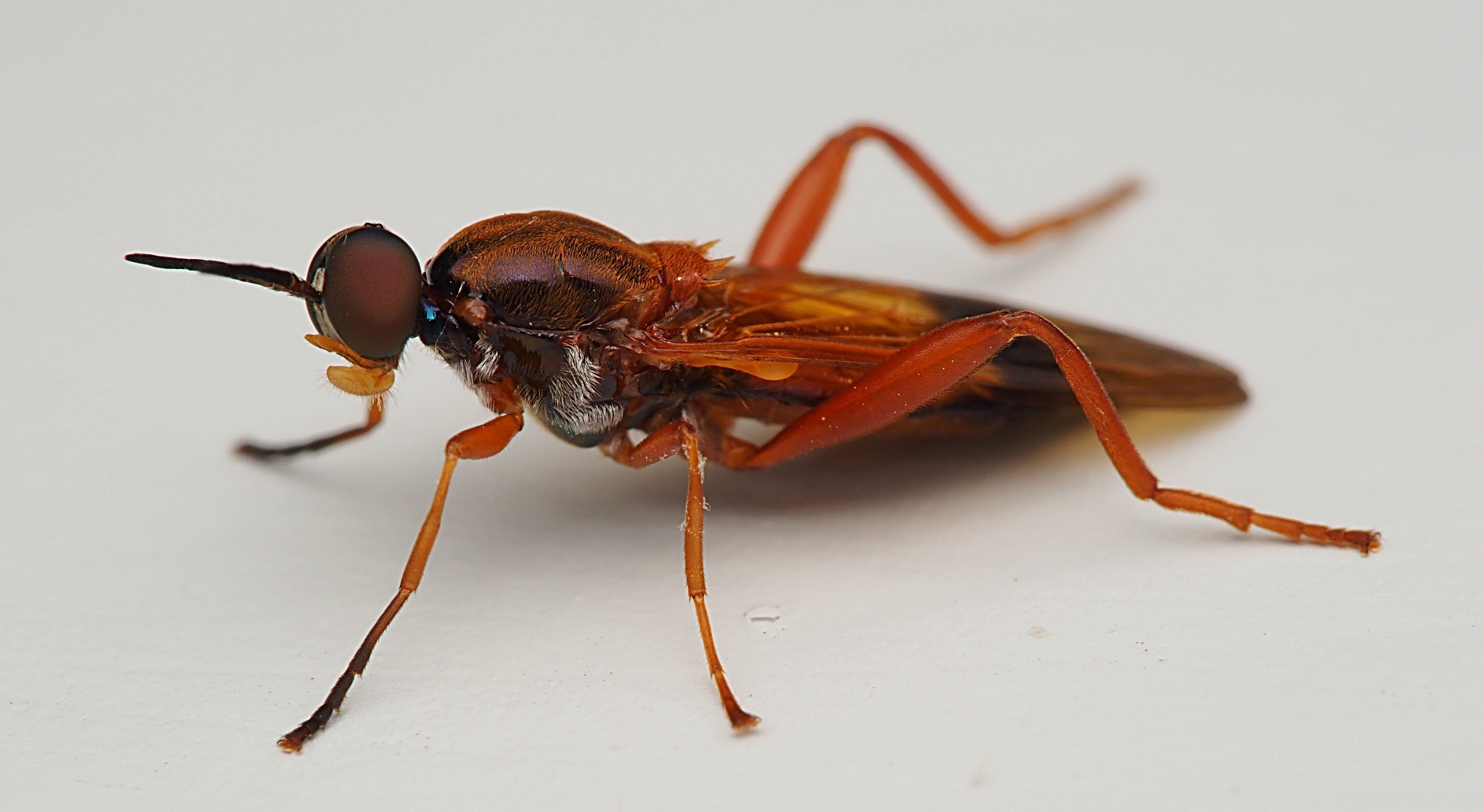
- Benhamyia apicalis

Scientific classification
- Kingdom: Animalia
- Phylum: Arthropoda
- Class: Insecta
- Order: Diptera
- Family: Stratiomyidae
- Subfamily: Beridinae
- Genus: Benhamyia; Miller, 1945

Type species
- Exaireta alpina Hutton, 1901

Synonyms
- Huttonella Enderlein, 1921

= Benhamyia =

Genus of flies

Benhamyia is a genus of flies in the family Stratiomyidae.

== Species ==
- Benhamyia alpina (Hutton, 1901)
- Benhamyia apicalis (Walker, 1849)
- Benhamyia hoheria (Miller, 1917)
- Benhamyia smaragdina (Lindner, 1958)
- Benhamyia straznitzkii (Nowicki, 1875)
