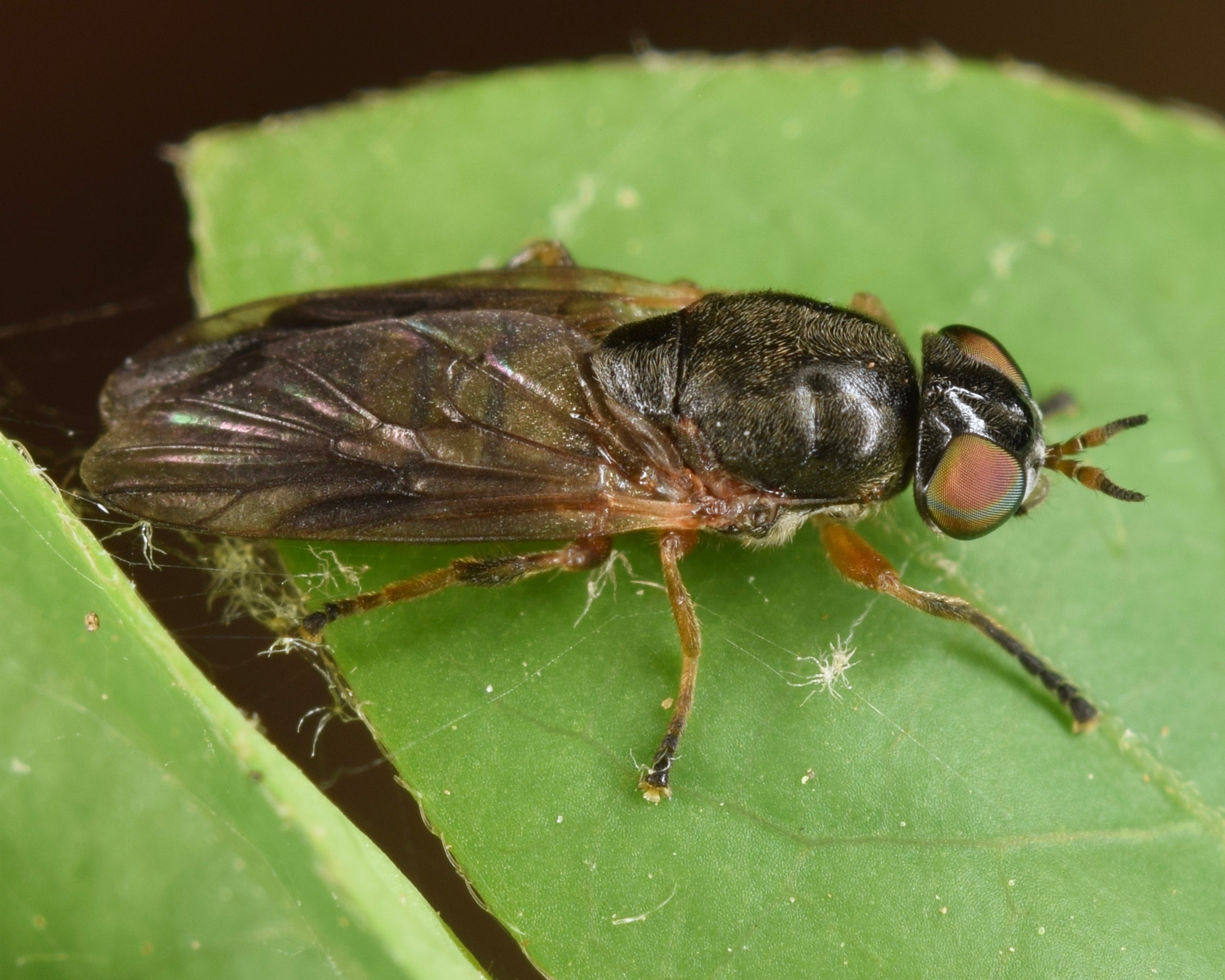
- Allognosta fuscitarsis

Scientific classification
- Kingdom: Animalia
- Phylum: Arthropoda
- Class: Insecta
- Order: Diptera
- Family: Stratiomyidae
- Subfamily: Beridinae
- Genus: Allognosta; Osten Sacken, 1883

Type species
- Beris fuscitarsis Say, 1823

Synonyms
- Anacanthoberis Brunetti, 1923; Allognista Johnson, 1925; Allogenosta Nagatomi, 1981

= Allognosta =

Genus of flies

Allognosta is a genus of soldier flies in the family Stratiomyidae.

== Species ==
- Allognosta acutata Li, Zhang & Yang, 2009
- Allognosta albifascia Frey, 1960
- Allognosta ancistra Li, Zhang & Yang, 2009
- Allognosta annulifemur Enderlein, 1921
- Allognosta apicinigra Zhang, Li & Yang, 2009
- Allognosta assamensis Brunetti, 1920
- Allognosta baoshana Li, Liu & Yang, 2011
- Allognosta basiflava Yang & Nagatomi, 1992
- Allognosta basinigra Li, Zhang & Yang, 2011
- Allognosta brevicornis Johnson, 1923
- Allognosta burmanica Frey, 1960
- Allognosta bwamba Woodley, 1987
- Allognosta caiqiana Li, Zhang & Yang, 2011
- Allognosta caloptera Frey, 1960
- Allognosta concava Li, Zhang & Yang, 2009
- Allognosta crassa Meijere, 1914
- Allognosta crassitarsis Meijere, 1914
- Allognosta dalongtana Li, Zhang & Yang, 2011
- Allognosta dorsalis Cui, Li & Yang, 2009
- Allognosta fanjingshana Cui, Li & Yang, 2009
- Allognosta flava Liu, Li & Yang, 2010
- Allognosta flavimaculata Nagatomi & Tanaka, 1969
- Allognosta flavofemoralis Pleske, 1926
- Allognosta flavopleuralis Frey, 1960
- Allognosta fuscipennis Enderlein, 1921
- Allognosta fuscitarsis (Say, 1823)
- Allognosta gongshana Zhang, Li & Yang, 2011
- Allognosta honghensis Li, Liu & Yang, 2011
- Allognosta inermis Brunetti, 1912
- Allognosta japonica Frey, 1960
- Allognosta jingyuana Liu, Li & Yang, 2010
- Allognosta jinpingensis Li, Liu & Yang, 2011
- Allognosta lativertex Frey, 1960
- Allognosta liangi Li, Zhang & Yang, 2011
- Allognosta liui Zhang, Li & Yang, 2009
- Allognosta longwangshana Li, Zhang & Yang, 2009
- Allognosta maculipleura Frey, 1960
- Allognosta maxima Enderlein, 1921
- Allognosta nigrifemur Cui, Li & Yang, 2009
- Allognosta nigripes Frey, 1960
- Allognosta ningxiana Zhang, Li & Yang, 2009
- Allognosta njombe Woodley, 2000
- Allognosta obscuriventris (Loew, 1863)
- Allognosta obtusa Li, Zhang & Yang, 2009
- Allognosta orientalis Yang & Nagatomi, 1992
- Allognosta partita Enderlein, 1921
- Allognosta philippina Frey, 1960
- Allognosta platypus James, 1969
- Allognosta pleuralis James, 1969
- Allognosta pulchella Frey, 1960
- Allognosta rufithorax Frey, 1960
- Allognosta shibuyai Nagatomi & Tanaka, 1969
- Allognosta sichuanensis Yang & Nagatomi, 1992
- Allognosta singularis Li, Liu & Yang, 2011
- Allognosta stigmaticalis Enderlein, 1921
- Allognosta stuckenbergae Lindner, 1961
- Allognosta tengchongana Li, Liu & Yang, 2011
- Allognosta tessmanni Enderlein, 1921
- Allognosta vagans (Loew, 1873)
- Allognosta varians Frey, 1960
- Allognosta wangzishana Li, Liu & Yang, 2011
- Allognosta yanshana Zhang, Li & Yang, 2009
- Allognosta zhuae Zhang, Li & Yang, 2009
