= Tytthoberis =

Scientific classification
- Kingdom: Animalia
- Phylum: Arthropoda
- Class: Insecta
- Order: Diptera
- Family: Stratiomyidae
- Subfamily: Beridinae
- Genus: Tytthoberis; Woodley, 1995

Type species
- Beris cuprea Hutton

Genus of flies

Tytthoberis is a genus of flies in the family Stratiomyidae.

== Species ==
- Tytthoberis cuprea (Hutton, 1901)
