= Aspartimas =

Scientific classification
- Kingdom: Animalia
- Phylum: Arthropoda
- Class: Insecta
- Order: Diptera
- Family: Stratiomyidae
- Subfamily: Beridinae
- Genus: Aspartimas; Woodley, 1995

Type species
- Spartimas formosanus Enderlein, 1921

Genus of flies

Aspartimas is a genus of flies in the family Stratiomyidae.

== Species ==
- Aspartimas formosanus (Enderlein, 1921)
