= Oplachantha =

Scientific classification
- Kingdom: Animalia
- Phylum: Arthropoda
- Class: Insecta
- Order: Diptera
- Family: Stratiomyidae
- Subfamily: Beridinae
- Genus: Oplachantha; Rondani, 1863

Type species
- Beris mexicana Bellardi, 1859

Genus of flies

Oplachantha is a genus of flies in the family Stratiomyidae.

== Species ==
- Oplachantha albitarsis (Macquart, 1846)
- Oplachantha annulipes (Enderlein, 1921)
- Oplachantha atricalx James, 1977
- Oplachantha bellula (Williston, 1888)
- Oplachantha caerulescens (Schiner, 1868)
- Oplachantha cincticornis Enderlein, 1921
- Oplachantha divisa James, 1977
- Oplachantha formosa Enderlein, 1921
- Oplachantha lanuginosa Enderlein, 1921
- Oplachantha latifrons Enderlein, 1921
- Oplachantha mexicana (Bellardi, 1859)
- Oplachantha pallida James, 1977
- Oplachantha peruana Enderlein, 1921
- Oplachantha pulchella Williston, 1888
- Oplachantha subcrassicalx Enderlein, 1921
- Oplachantha tricolor (Wiedemann, 1828)
- Oplachantha viriata Enderlein, 1921
