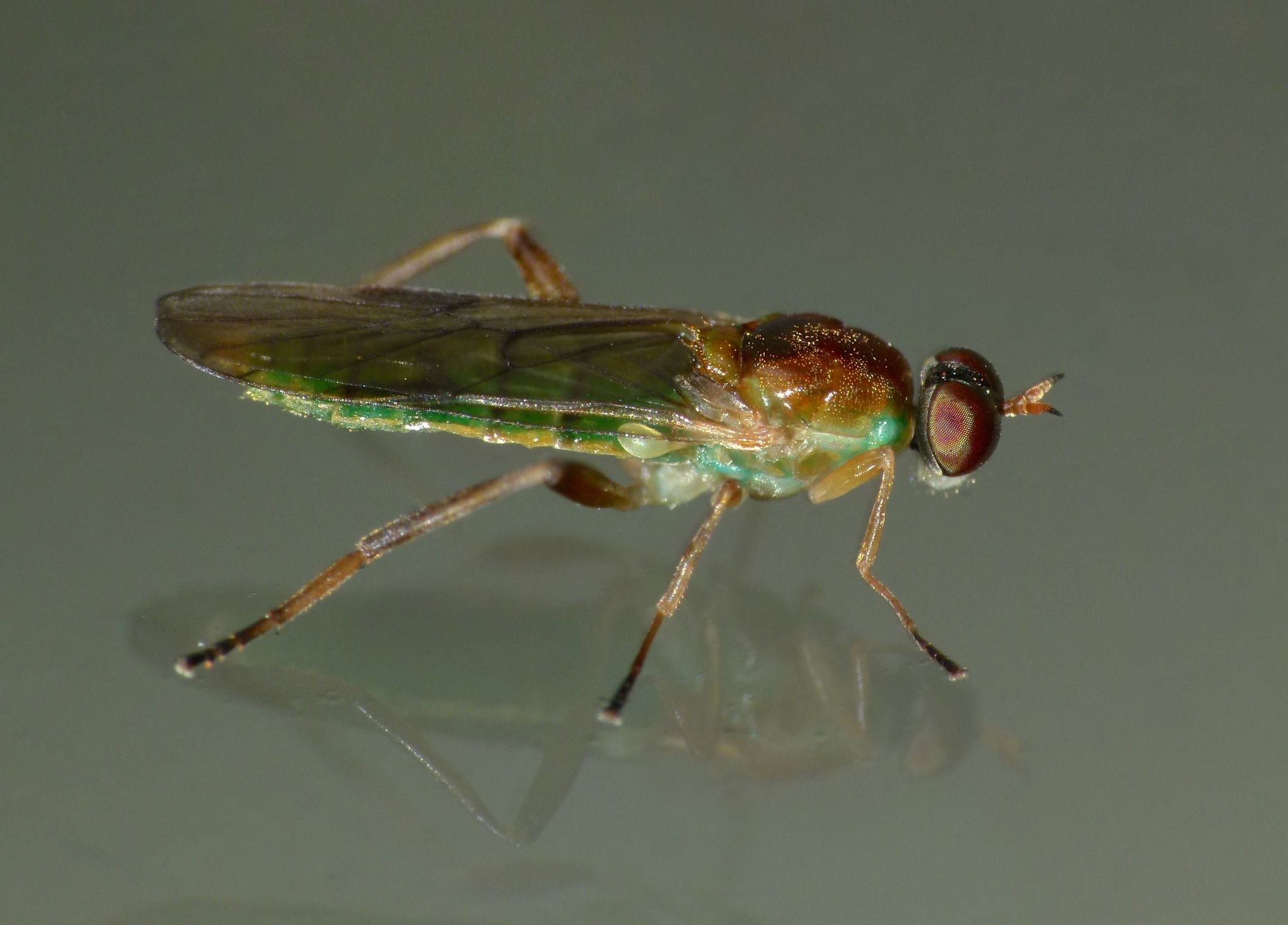
- Australoberis refugians

Scientific classification
- Kingdom: Animalia
- Phylum: Arthropoda
- Class: Insecta
- Order: Diptera
- Family: Stratiomyidae
- Subfamily: Beridinae
- Genus: Australoberis; Lindner, 1958

Type species
- Australoberis amoena Lindner, 1958

= Australoberis =

Genus of flies

Australoberis is a genus of flies in the family Stratiomyidae.

== Species ==
- Australoberis amoena Lindner, 1958
- Australoberis refugians (Miller, 1917)
