= Berisina =

Scientific classification
- Kingdom: Animalia
- Phylum: Arthropoda
- Class: Insecta
- Order: Diptera
- Family: Stratiomyidae
- Subfamily: Beridinae
- Genus: Berisina; Malloch, 1928

Type species
- Berisina maculipennis Malloch, 1928

Genus of flies

Berisina is a genus of flies in the family Stratiomyidae.

== Species ==
- Berisina caliginosa (Miller, 1917)
- Berisina maculipennis Malloch, 1928
- Berisina saltusans (Miller, 1917)
