= Paraberismyia =

Scientific classification
- Kingdom: Animalia
- Phylum: Arthropoda
- Class: Insecta
- Order: Diptera
- Family: Stratiomyidae
- Subfamily: Beridinae
- Genus: Paraberismyia; Woodley, 1995

Type species
- Paraberismyia tzontehuitza Woodley, 1995

Genus of flies

Paraberismyia is a genus of flies in the family Stratiomyidae.

== Species ==
- Paraberismyia chiapas Woodley, 2013
- Paraberismyia mathisi Woodley, 2013
- Paraberismyia triunfo Woodley, 2013
- Paraberismyia tzontehuitza Woodley, 1995
