= Archistratiomys =

Scientific classification
- Kingdom: Animalia
- Phylum: Arthropoda
- Class: Insecta
- Order: Diptera
- Family: Stratiomyidae
- Subfamily: Beridinae
- Genus: Archistratiomys; Enderlein, 1913

Type species
- Beris luctifera Philippi, 1865

Synonyms
- Diphysa Macquart, 1838

Genus of flies

Archistratiomys is a genus of flies in the family Stratiomyidae.

== Species ==
- Archistratiomys luctifera (Philippi, 1865)
- Archistratiomys rufipalpis (Wiedemann, 1830)
