= Spartimas =

Scientific classification
- Kingdom: Animalia
- Phylum: Arthropoda
- Clade: Pancrustacea
- Class: Insecta
- Order: Diptera
- Family: Stratiomyidae
- Subfamily: Beridinae
- Genus: Spartimas; Enderlein, 1921

Type species
- Spartimas ornatipes Enderlein, 1921

Genus of flies

Spartimas is a genus of flies in the family Stratiomyidae.

== Species ==
- Spartimas apiciniger Zhang & Yang, 2010
- Spartimas hainanensis Zhang & Yang, 2010
- Spartimas ornatipes Enderlein, 1921
