= Smaragdinomyia =

Scientific classification
- Kingdom: Animalia
- Phylum: Arthropoda
- Class: Insecta
- Order: Diptera
- Family: Stratiomyidae
- Subfamily: Beridinae
- Genus: Smaragdinomyia; Woodley, 1995

Type species
- Actina magnifica James, 1975

Genus of flies

Smaragdinomyia is a genus of flies in the family Stratiomyidae.

== Species ==
- Smaragdinomyia magnifica (James, 1975)
