= Beridella =

Scientific classification
- Kingdom: Animalia
- Phylum: Arthropoda
- Class: Insecta
- Order: Diptera
- Family: Stratiomyidae
- Subfamily: Beridinae
- Genus: Beridella; Becker, 1919

Type species
- Beridella bicolor Becker, 1919

Synonyms
- Hemimegacis Enderlein, 1921; Incaberis James, 1975

Genus of flies

Beridella is a genus of flies in the family Stratiomyidae.

== Species ==
- Beridella brunnicosa Becker, 1919
- Beridella guerinii (Macquart, 1846)
- Beridella iris (James, 1975)
- Beridella maculifrons (Enderlein, 1921)
