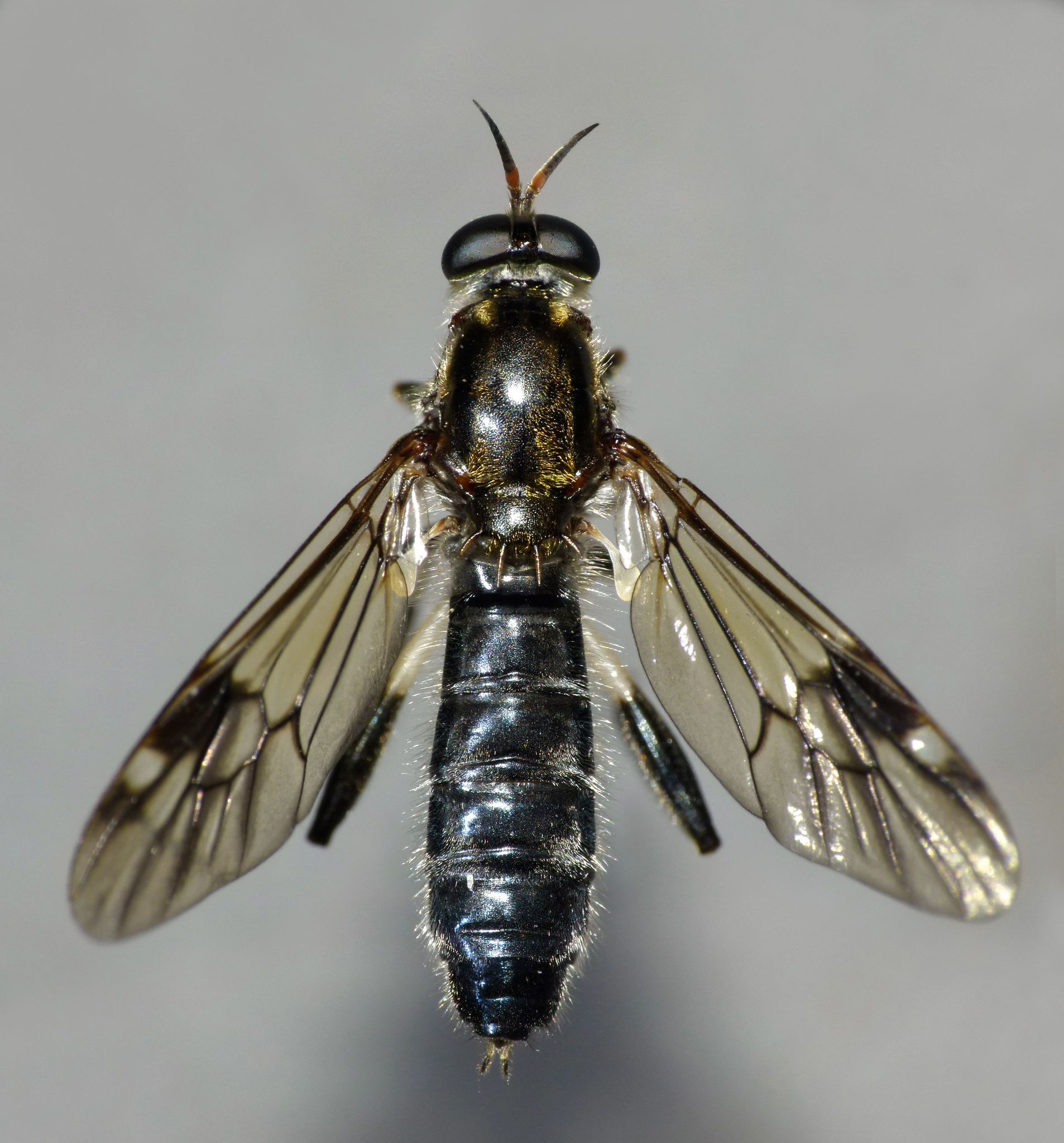
- Exaireta spinigera

Scientific classification
- Kingdom: Animalia
- Phylum: Arthropoda
- Class: Insecta
- Order: Diptera
- Family: Stratiomyidae
- Subfamily: Beridinae
- Genus: Exaireta; Schiner, 1868

Synonyms
- Apospasma Enderlein, 1921; Xanthoberis White, 1916

= Exaireta =

Genus of flies

Exaireta is a genus of soldier flies in the family Stratiomyidae.

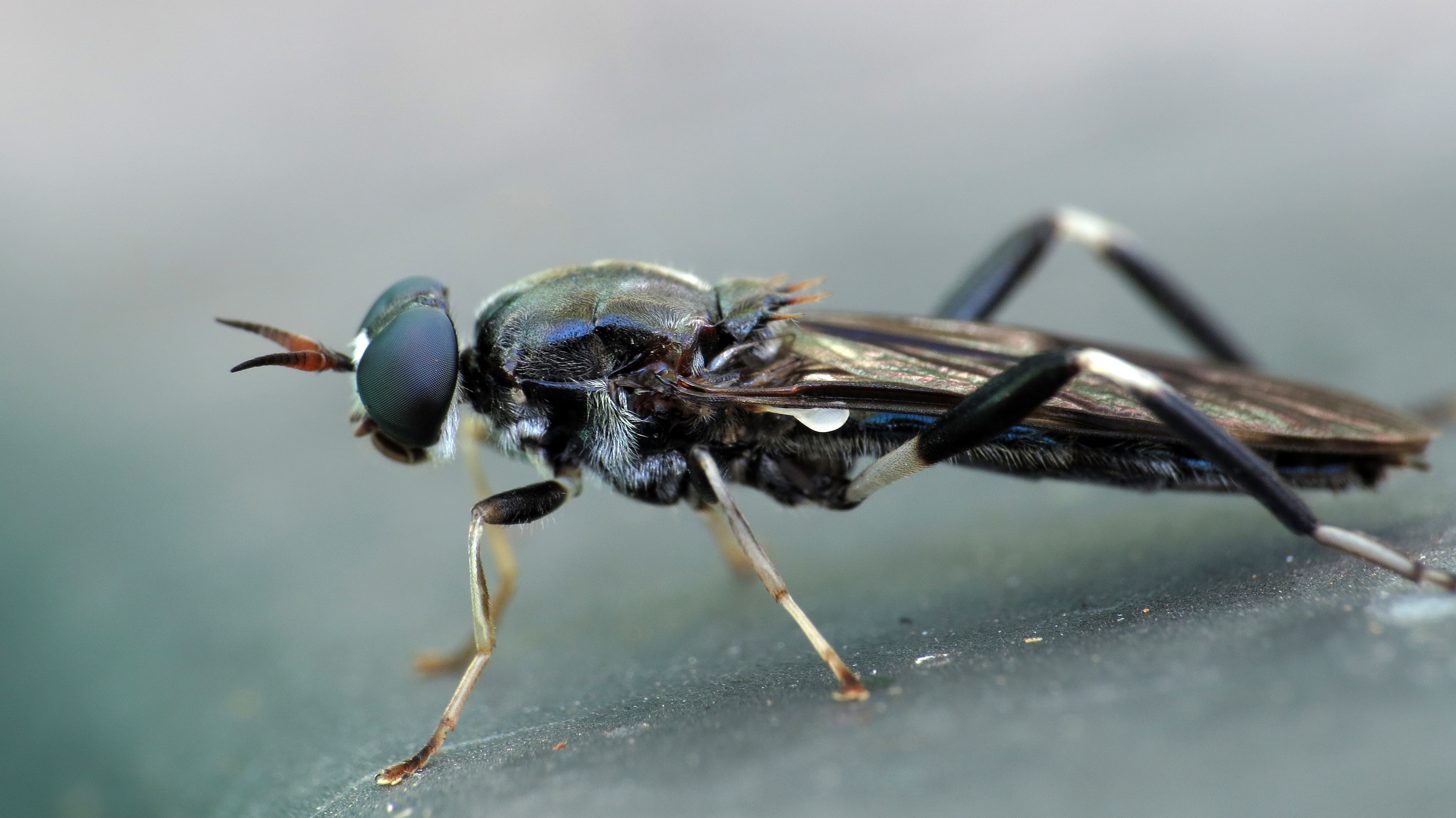
Exaireta spinigera

== Species ==
- Exaireta siliacea (White, 1916)
- Exaireta spinigera (Wiedemann, 1830)
