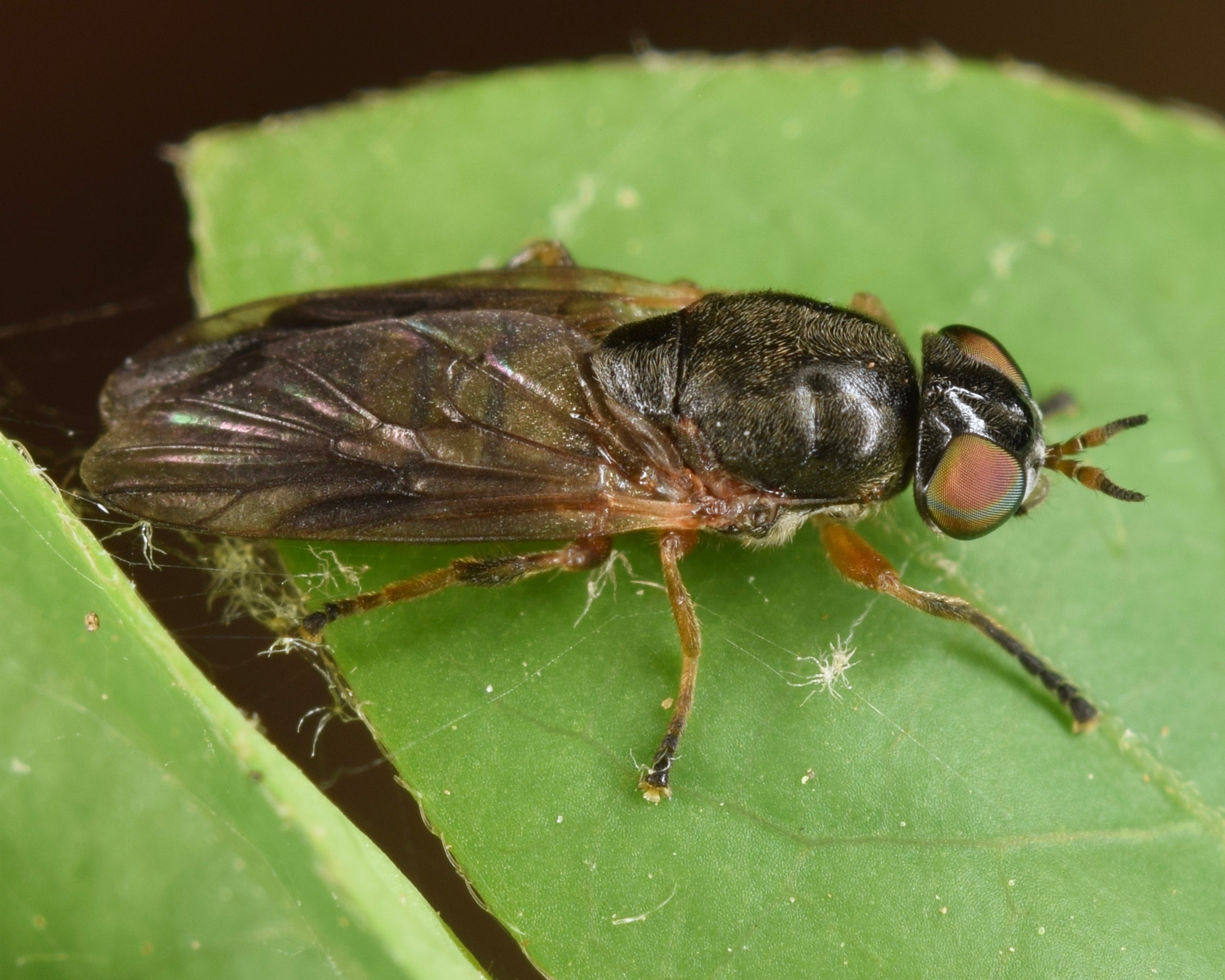

Scientific classification
- Domain: Eukaryota
- Kingdom: Animalia
- Phylum: Arthropoda
- Class: Insecta
- Order: Diptera
- Family: Stratiomyidae
- Genus: Allognosta
- Species: A. fuscitarsis

Binomial name
- Allognosta fuscitarsis (Say, 1823)

Synonyms
- Beris brevis Walker, 1848; Beris fuscitarsis Say, 1823; Beris lata Walker, 1848; Sargus dorsalis Say, 1824; Sargus pallipes Wiedemann, 1830

= Allognosta fuscitarsis =

Species of fly

Allognosta fuscitarsis is a species of soldier fly in the family Stratiomyidae.
