= Neoberis =

Scientific classification
- Kingdom: Animalia
- Phylum: Arthropoda
- Class: Insecta
- Order: Diptera
- Family: Stratiomyidae
- Subfamily: Beridinae
- Genus: Neoberis; Lindner, 1949

Type species
- Neoberis brasiliana Lindner, 1949

Genus of flies

Neoberis is a genus of flies in the family Stratiomyidae.

== Species ==
- Neoberis brasiliana Lindner, 1949
