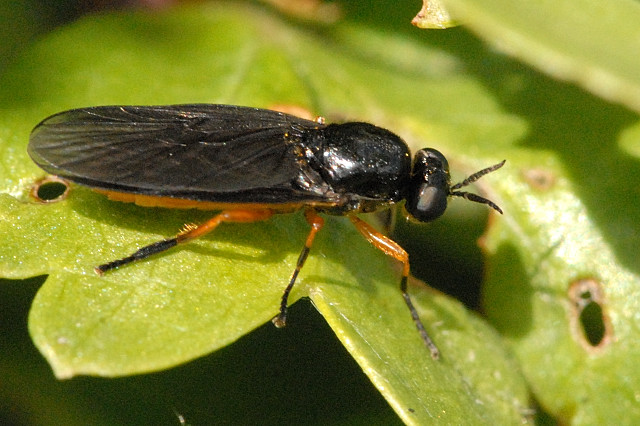
- Beris clavipes

Scientific classification
- Domain: Eukaryota
- Kingdom: Animalia
- Phylum: Arthropoda
- Class: Insecta
- Order: Diptera
- Family: Stratiomyidae
- Subfamily: Beridinae; Westwood, 1838

= Beridinae =

Subfamily of flies

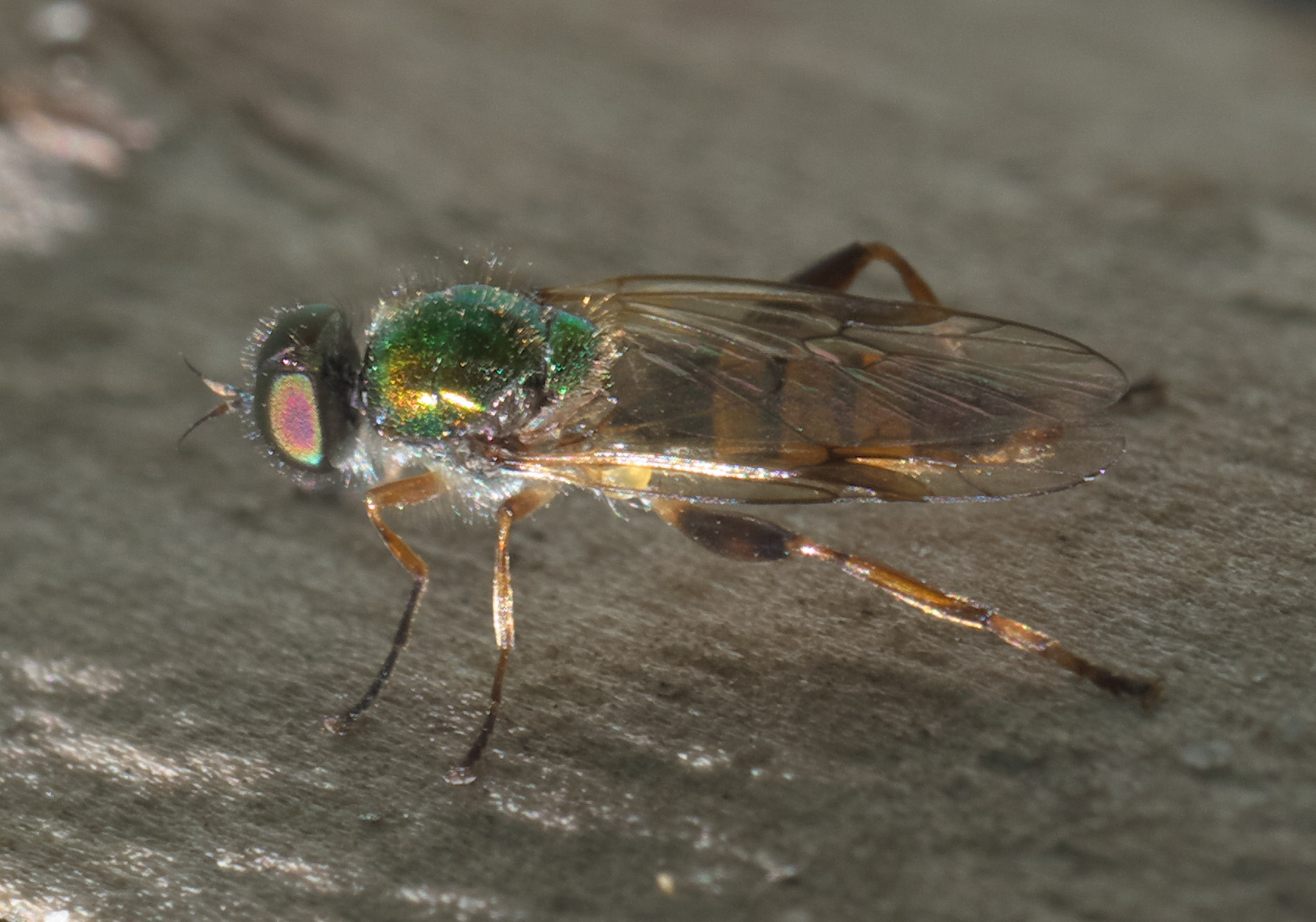

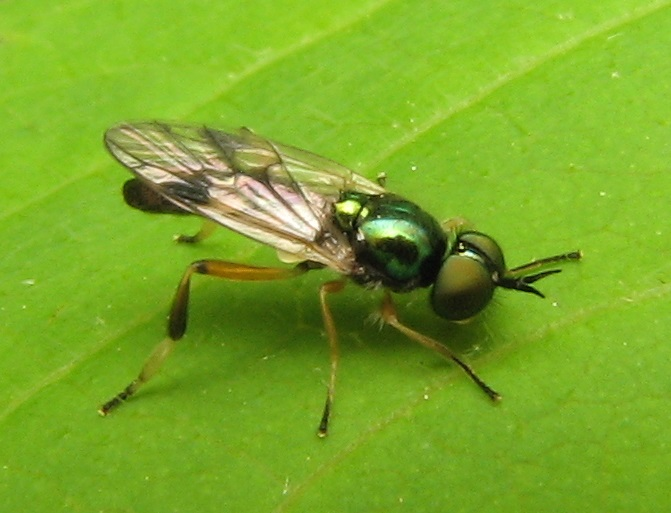
Actina viridis

Beridinae is a subfamily of soldier flies in the family Stratiomyidae.

== Genera ==
- Actina Meigen, 1804
- Actinomyia Lindner, 1949
- Allognosta Osten Sacken, 1883
- Anexaireta Woodley, 1995
- Archistratiomys Enderlein, 1913
- Arcuavena Woodley, 1995
- Aspartimas Woodley, 1995
- Australoactina Woodley, 1995
- Australoberis Lindner, 1958
- Benhamyia Miller, 1945
- Beridella Becker, 1919
- Beridops Enderlein, 1913
- Beris Latreille, 1802
- Berisina Malloch, 1928
- Berismyia Giglio-Tos, 1891
- Chorisops Rondani, 1856
- Draymonia Aubertin, 1932
- Eumecacis Enderlein, 1921
- Exaeretina Enderlein, 1921
- Exaireta Schiner, 1868
- Hadrestia Thomson, 1869
- Heteracanthia Macquart, 1850
- Macromeracis Enderlein, 1921
- Microhadrestia Lindner, 1943
- Mischomedia Woodley, 1995
- Neactina Enderlein, 1921
- Neoberis Lindner, 1949
- Oplachantha Rondani, 1863
- Paraberismyia Woodley, 1995
- Smaragdinomyia Woodley, 1995
- Spartimas Enderlein, 1921
- Tytthoberis Woodley, 1995
- Zealandoberis Woodley, 1995
