= Cypoides parachinensis =

Scientific classification
- Kingdom: Animalia
- Phylum: Arthropoda
- Class: Insecta
- Order: Lepidoptera
- Family: Sphingidae
- Genus: Cypoides
- Species: C. parachinensis

Binomial name
- Cypoides parachinensis Brechlin, 2009

Species of moth

Cypoides parachinensis is a species of moth of the family Sphingidae first described by Ronald Brechlin in 2009. It is known from Myanmar.
