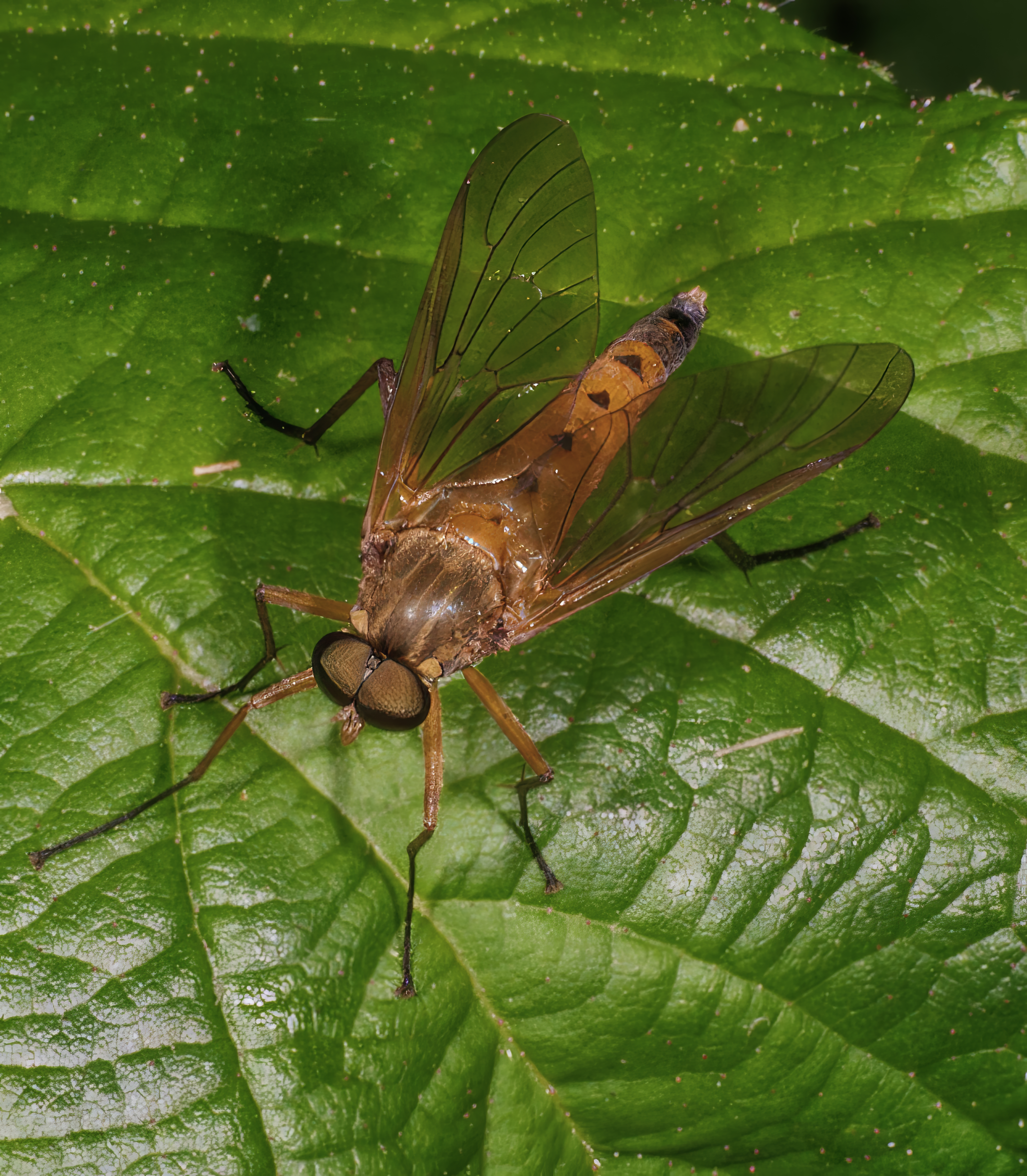
- Male
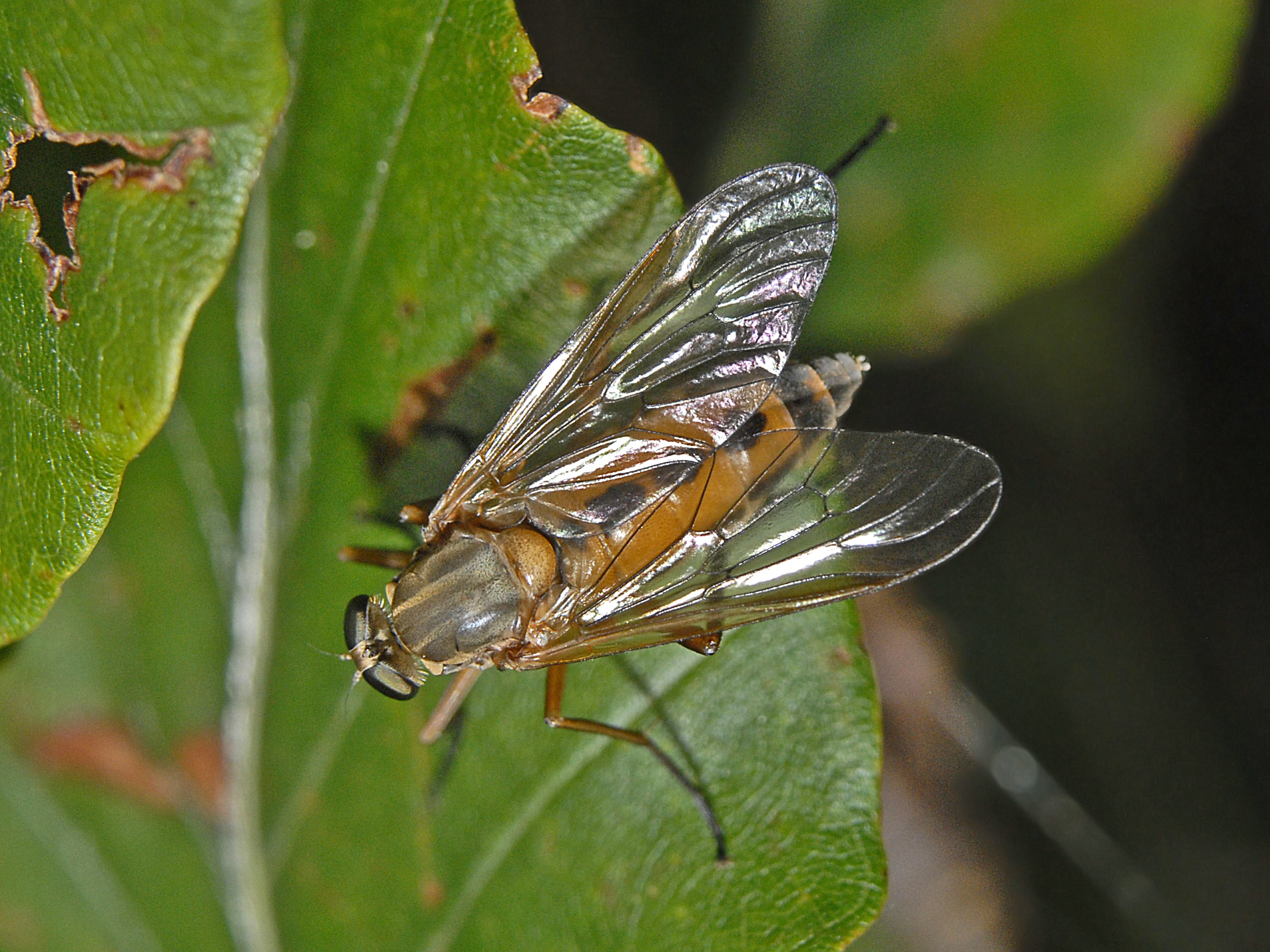
- Female

Scientific classification
- Kingdom: Animalia
- Phylum: Arthropoda
- Clade: Pancrustacea
- Class: Insecta
- Order: Diptera
- Family: Rhagionidae
- Genus: Rhagio
- Species: R. tringarius

Binomial name
- Rhagio tringarius (Linnaeus, 1758)

Synonyms
- Erax rufus Scopoli, 1763; Sylvicola solivagus Harris, 1780; Musca vermileo Schrank, 1781; Rhagio vanellus Fabricius, 1794; Leptis simplex Meigen, 1838; Leptis punctatus Loew, 1840; Leptis cinerea Zetterstedt, 1842; Leptis ephippium Zetterstedt, 1842; Leptis nigriventris Loew, 1869; Leptis cartereaui Gobert, 1877; Leptis pandellei Gobert, 1877; Leptis perrisii Gobert, 1877; Leptis goebelii Strobl, 1893; Leptis perezii Gobert, 1877; Rhagio tripustulatus Szilady, 1934

= Rhagio tringarius =

Species of fly

Rhagio tringarius, common name marsh snipefly, is a species of fly from the family Rhagionidae.

== Description ==
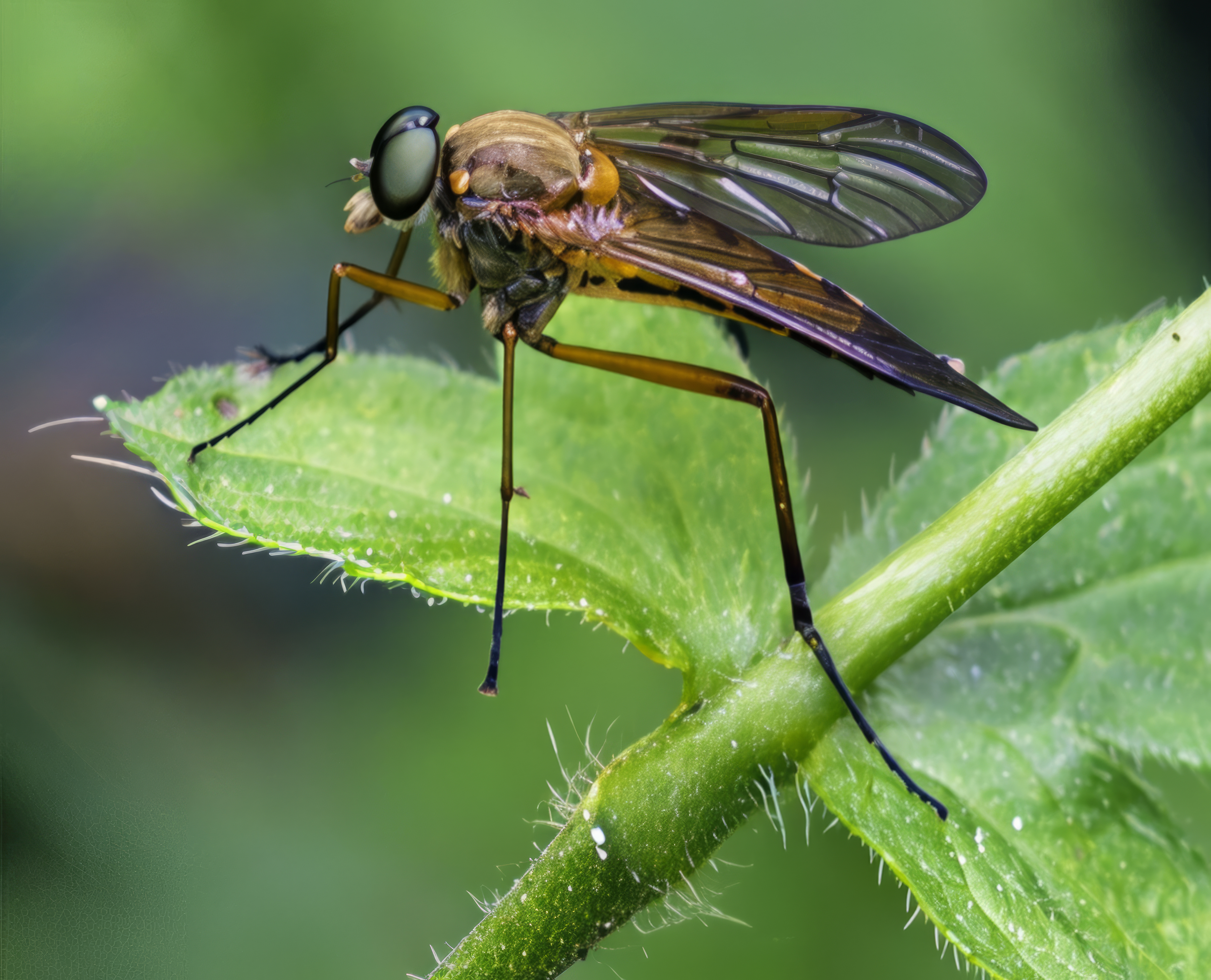
side view on Geum urbanum

Rhagio tringarius can reach a length of 8–14 millimetres (0.31–0.55 in). The abdomen and the long slender legs are yellow-orange. The patterning on the abdomen is quite variable, but usually it shows black well spaced dorsal triangles. Also the last abdomen tergites are black. Wings are clear, as this fly lacks the dark wing stigma common in the genus Rhagio.

== Ecology ==
The larvae of this snipefly dwell in the ground, on litter and detritus. They are predatory hunters, feeding on small beetles and earthworms. Adults occur from May to September, usually resting on leaves.

== Distribution and habitat ==
This species is present in most European countries, as well as part of the American Northeast and the upper half of the west coast. It can be found in wet meadows, hedgerows, woods and areas with a rich vegetation.
