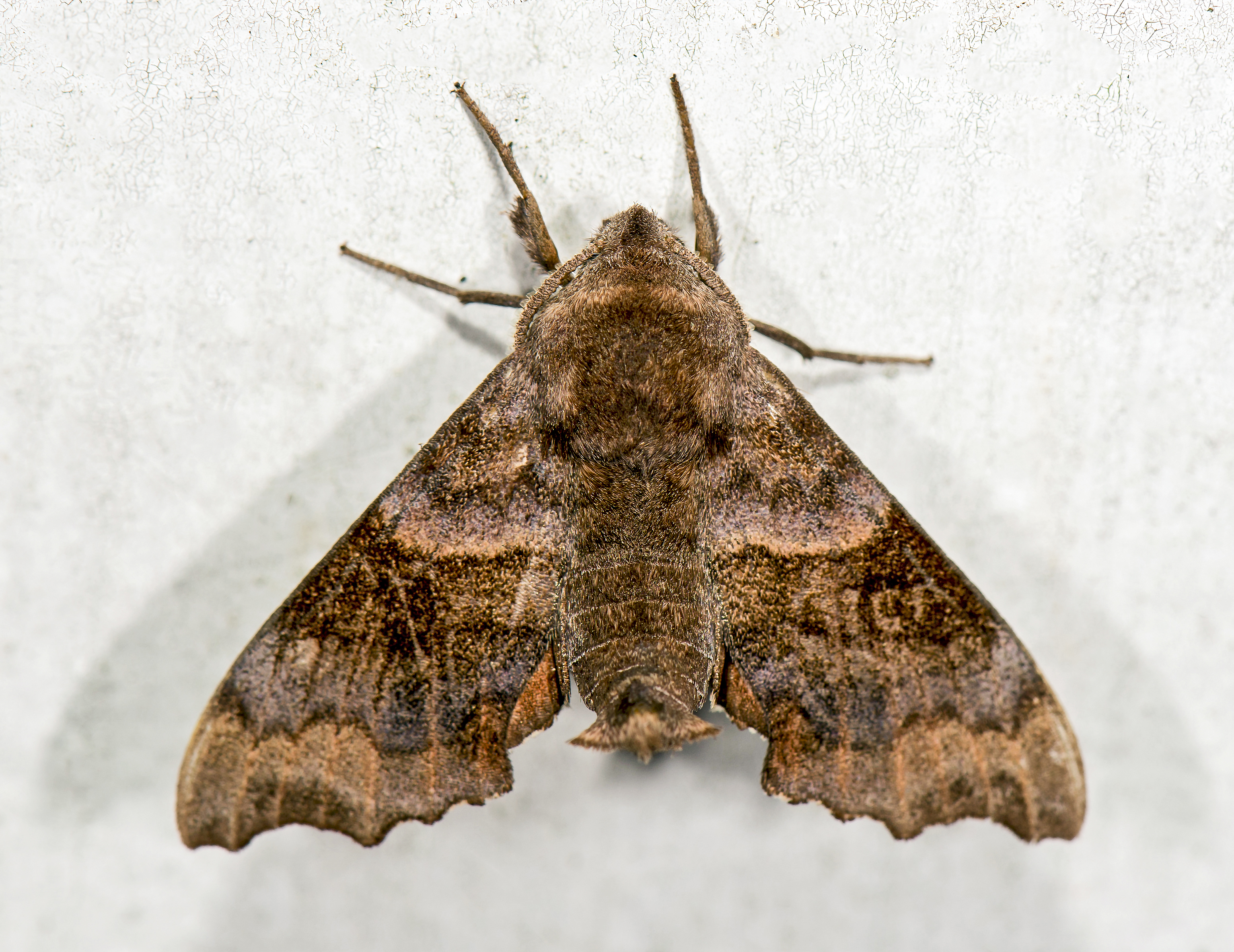

Scientific classification
- Kingdom: Animalia
- Phylum: Arthropoda
- Class: Insecta
- Order: Lepidoptera
- Family: Sphingidae
- Genus: Cypoides
- Species: C. chinensis

Binomial name
- Cypoides chinensis (Rothschild & Jordan, 1903)

Synonyms
- Smerinthulus chinensis Rothschild & Jordan, 1903; Enpinanga transtriata Chu & Wang, 1980; Cypa formosana Wileman, 1910; Amorphulus chinensis fasciata (Mell, 1922)

= Cypoides chinensis =

Species of moth

Cypoides chinensis is a species of moth of the family Sphingidae first described by Walter Rothschild and Karl Jordan in 1903.

== Distribution ==
It is known from southern China and Taiwan, south to mountainous northern Vietnam and north-eastern Thailand.
