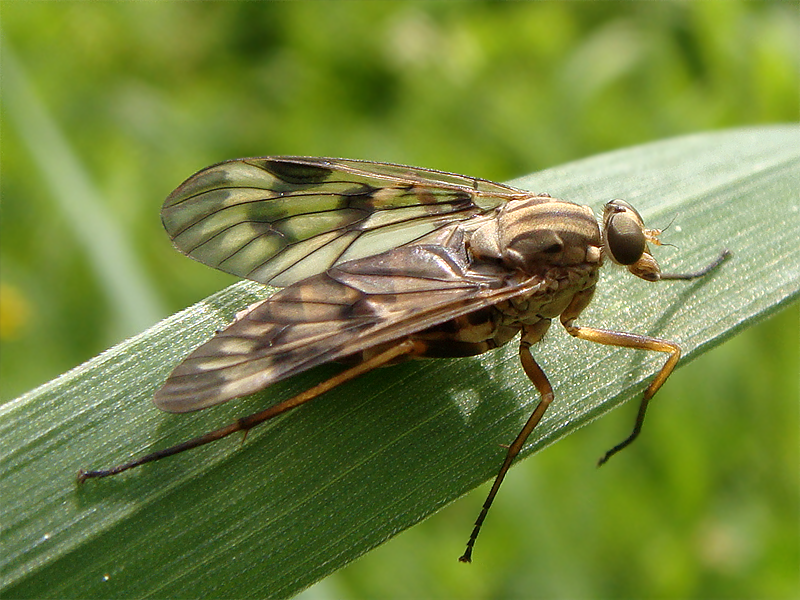

Scientific classification
- Domain: Eukaryota
- Kingdom: Animalia
- Phylum: Arthropoda
- Class: Insecta
- Order: Diptera
- Family: Rhagionidae
- Genus: Rhagio
- Species: R. strigosus

Binomial name
- Rhagio strigosus ( Meigen, 1804

= Rhagio strigosus =

Species of fly

Rhagio strigosus is a Palearctic species of snipe fly in the family Rhagionidae.
