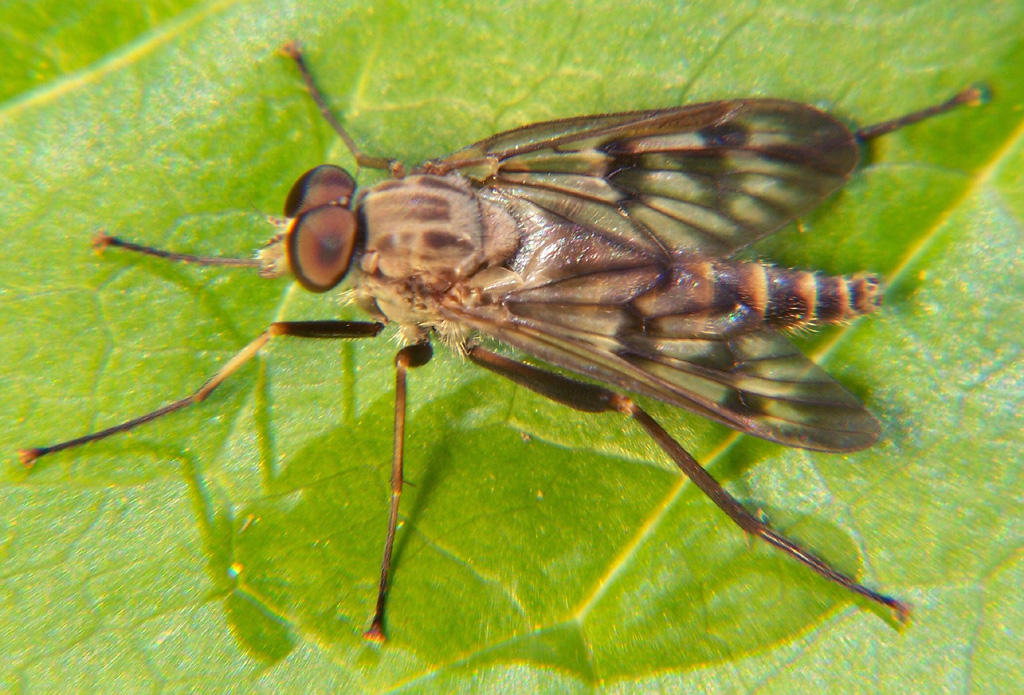

Scientific classification
- Kingdom: Animalia
- Phylum: Arthropoda
- Clade: Pancrustacea
- Class: Insecta
- Order: Diptera
- Family: Rhagionidae
- Genus: Rhagio
- Species: R. mystaceus

Binomial name
- Rhagio mystaceus (Macquart, 1840)

Synonyms
- Leptis mystacea Macquart, 1840

= Rhagio mystaceus =

Species of fly

Rhagio mystaceus, also known as the down-looker fly, downlooker snipefly and common snipe fly, is a species of fly from the family Rhagionidae.

== Description ==
Rhagio mystaceus has an overall dark color, with males growing to 7–9 mm, and females reaching 6–8 mm. The thorax has three dark dorsal stripes. Normally, the center stripe has a very thin, pale line running down the middle. On the abdomen, there are yellowish rings at the posterior of the segments. However, the basal segment on some specimens are mostly yellowish and have a black dorsal and lateral spot.

The wings are patterned, with dark tips.

== Range ==
The fly is found in middle and eastern North America, east of the Great Plains.
