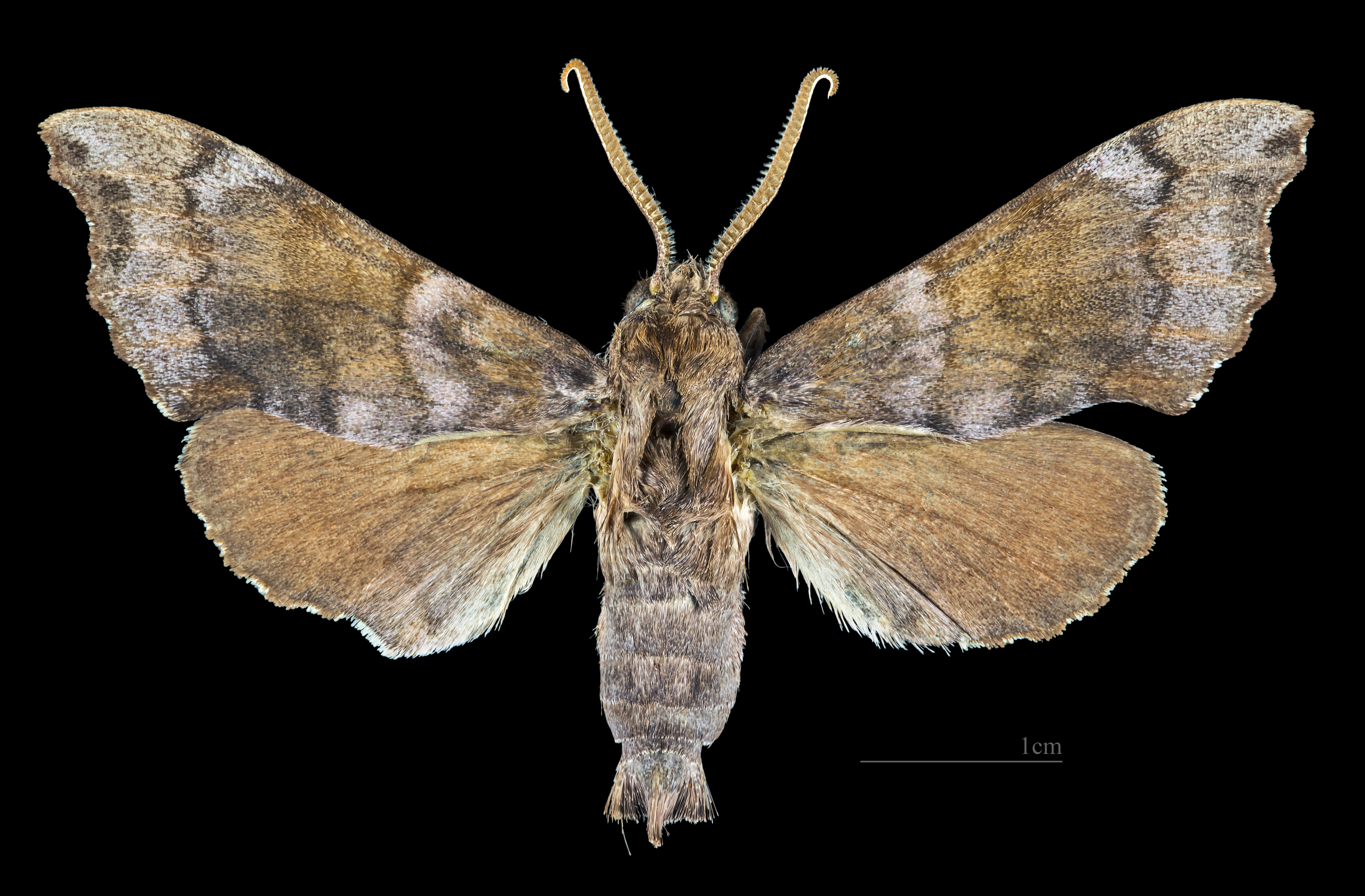
- Cypoides chinensis

Scientific classification
- Domain: Eukaryota
- Kingdom: Animalia
- Phylum: Arthropoda
- Class: Insecta
- Order: Lepidoptera
- Family: Sphingidae
- Tribe: Smerinthini
- Genus: Cypoides; Matsumura, 1921

Synonyms
- Amorphulus Mell, 1922

= Cypoides =

Genus of moths

Cypoides is a genus of moths in the family Sphingidae. The genus was erected by Shōnen Matsumura in 1921.

== Species ==
- Cypoides chinensis (Rothschild & Jordan, 1903)
- Cypoides parachinensis Brechlin, 2009
