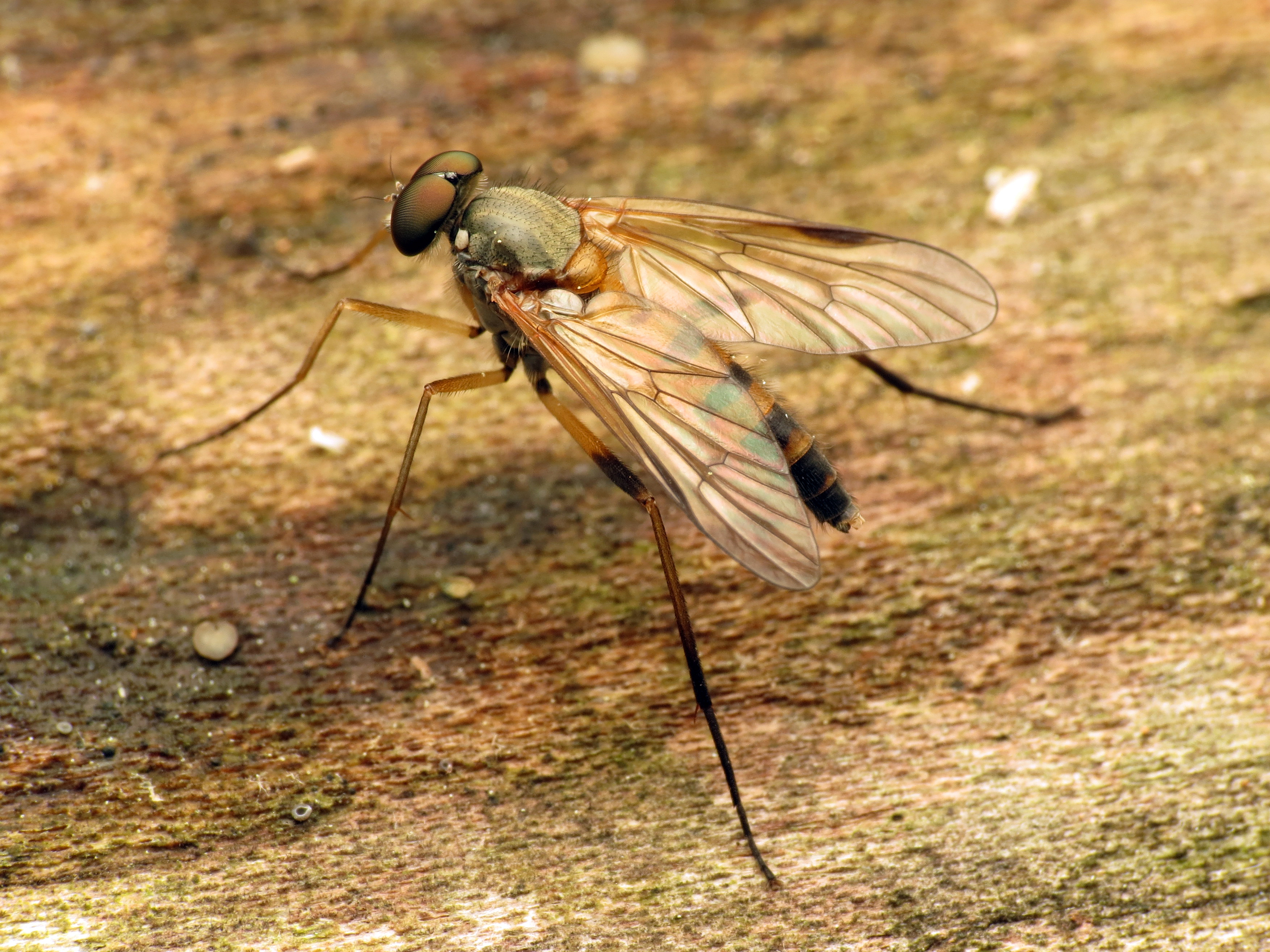
- Rhagio vertebratus in Rock Creek Park, Washington, DC, USA.

Scientific classification
- Domain: Eukaryota
- Kingdom: Animalia
- Phylum: Arthropoda
- Class: Insecta
- Order: Diptera
- Family: Rhagionidae
- Genus: Rhagio
- Species: R. vertebratus

Binomial name
- Rhagio vertebratus (Say, 1823)

= Rhagio vertebratus =

Species of fly

Rhagio vertebratus is a species of snipe fly belonging to the family Rhagionidae. Adults are up to 8.5 mm (0.335 in) in length.
