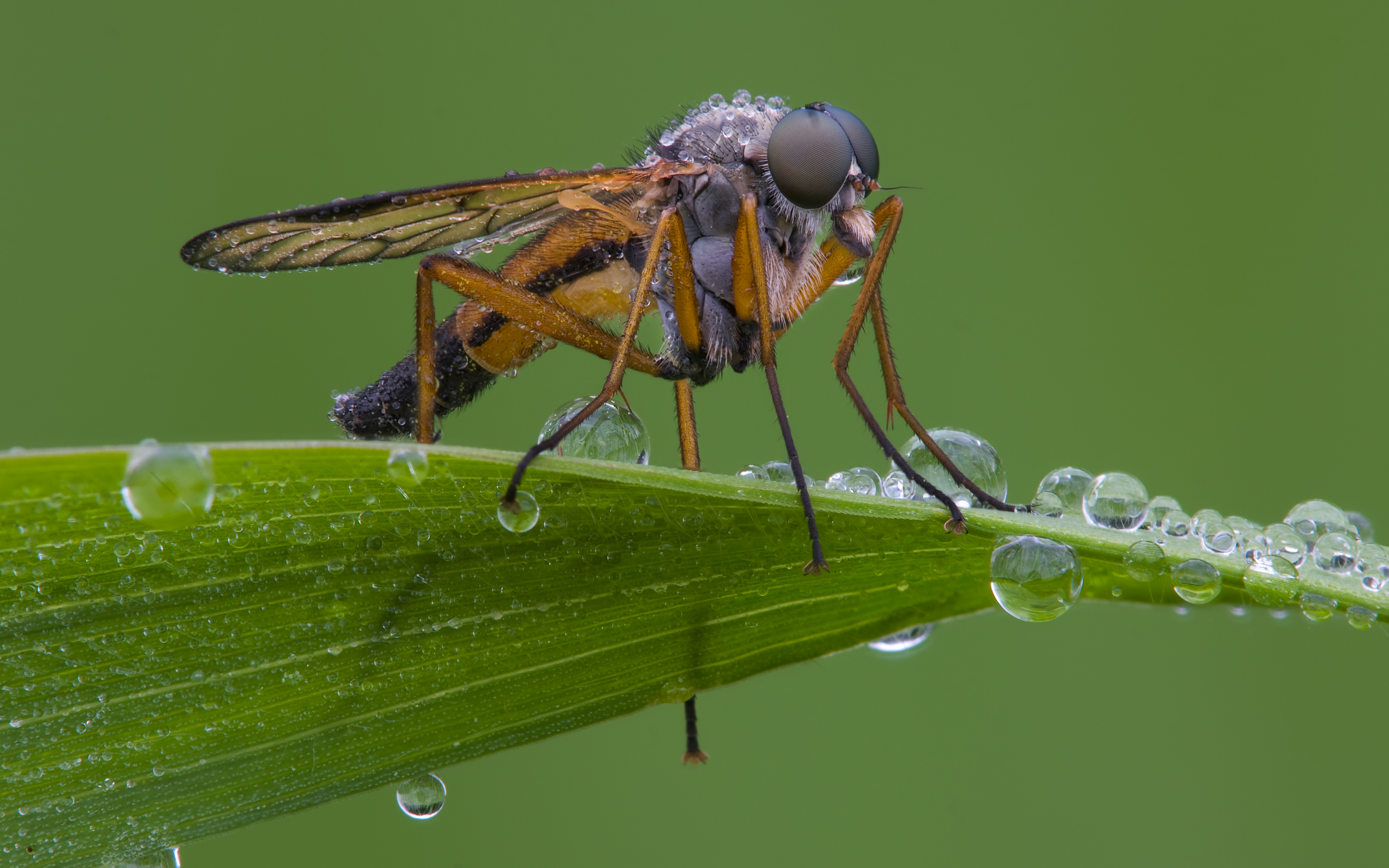

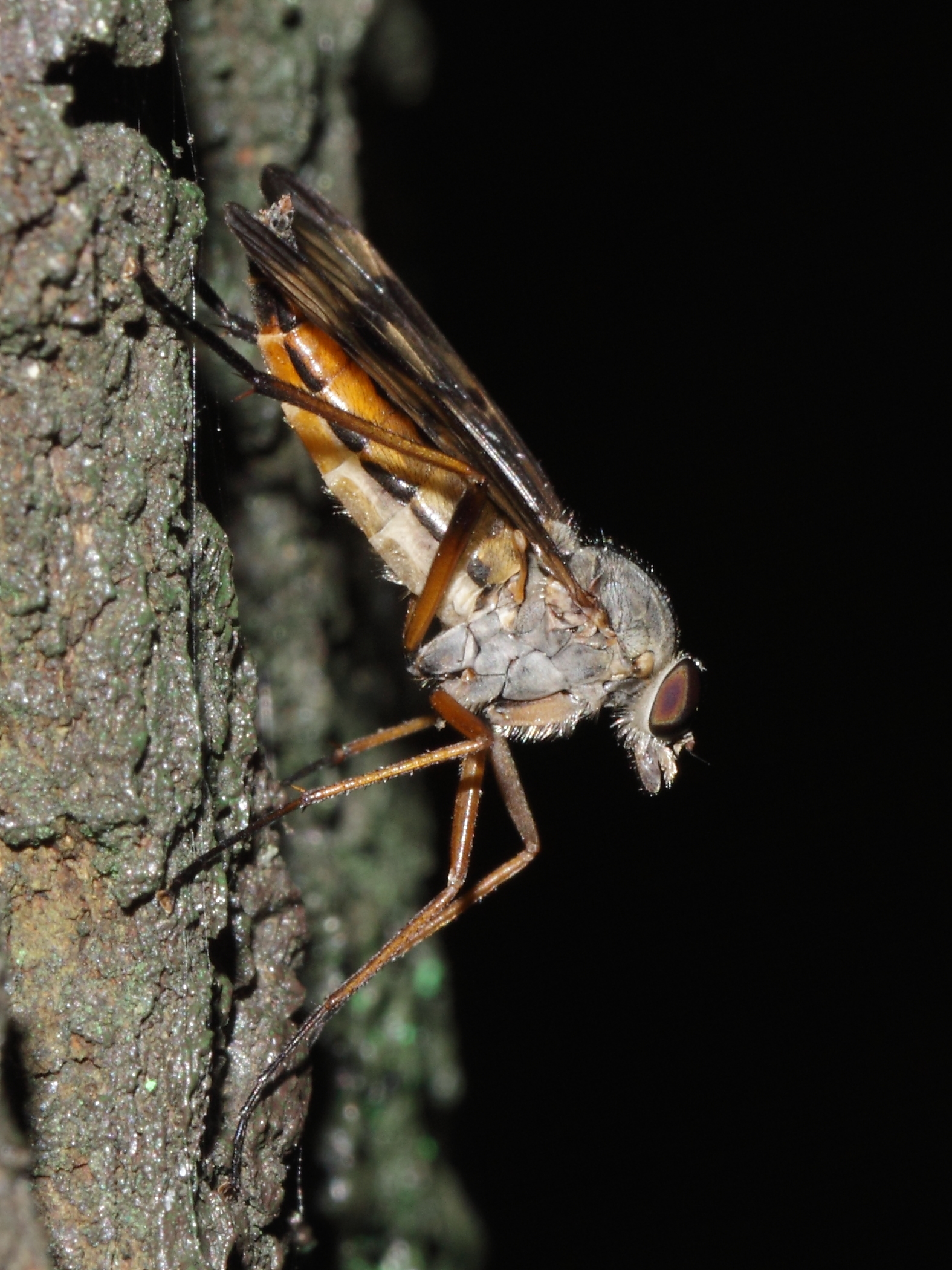
- "downlooker"

Scientific classification
- Kingdom: Animalia
- Phylum: Arthropoda
- Clade: Pancrustacea
- Class: Insecta
- Order: Diptera
- Family: Rhagionidae
- Genus: Rhagio
- Species: R. scolopaceus

Binomial name
- Rhagio scolopaceus (Linnaeus, 1758)

Synonyms
- Musca scolopacea Linnaeus, 1758; Rhagio monotropus (Harris, 1780); Rhagio solitarius (Harris, 1780); Sylvicola monotropus Harris, 1780; Sylvicola solitarius Harris, 1780

= Rhagio scolopaceus =

Species of fly

Rhagio scolopaceus is thought to be the most common species of fly from the family Rhagionidae, with key identification markers being the presence of dark spots or bands on the wings and the elongation of the third (final) antennal segment. Notable sexually dimorphic features exhibited are seen with the females having a broader frons, as well as clearly separate (dichoptic) compound eyes in contrast to the nearly conjoined (holoptic) eyes of the males. The species reaches a body length of 8 to 14 millimeters. The slender, long-legged flies have a short but strong proboscis used for feeding. The face is grey with bare eyes. There is a post orbital fringe of white hairs.The thorax is grey in both sexes with three dark grey longitudinal stripes on the dorsum. The scutellum and the chitin plates on the sides, as well as on the underside, are grey with short black hairs medially. The abdomen is reddish-yellow, covered in the middle with triangular black spots, and has black side spots on the flanks. The legs are yellow, with the feet being more brownish. The wings are brownish and spotted.The stigma is close to or joined to the basal attachment of the fork R4 + R5.

It is also known as the downlooker snipefly. It is the type species of the genus Rhagio.

Female R. scolopaceus feeding on Impatiens
