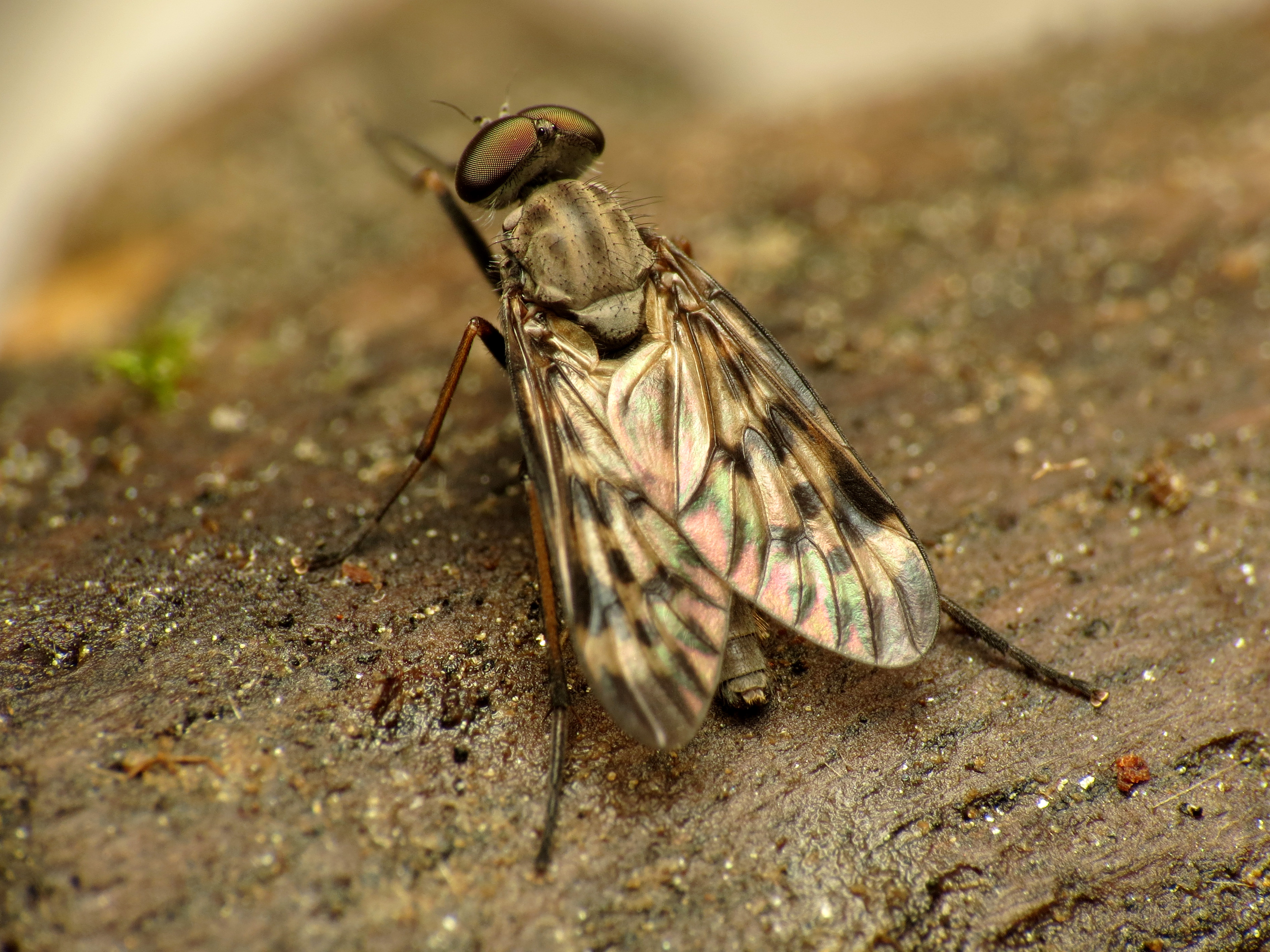

Scientific classification
- Domain: Eukaryota
- Kingdom: Animalia
- Phylum: Arthropoda
- Class: Insecta
- Order: Diptera
- Family: Rhagionidae
- Genus: Rhagio
- Species: R. punctipennis

Binomial name
- Rhagio punctipennis (Say, 1823)

Synonyms
- Atherix filius Walker, 1848; Leptis punctipennis Say, 1823

= Rhagio punctipennis =

Species of fly

Rhagio punctipennis, the lesser variegated snipe fly, is a species of snipe flies in the family Rhagionidae.

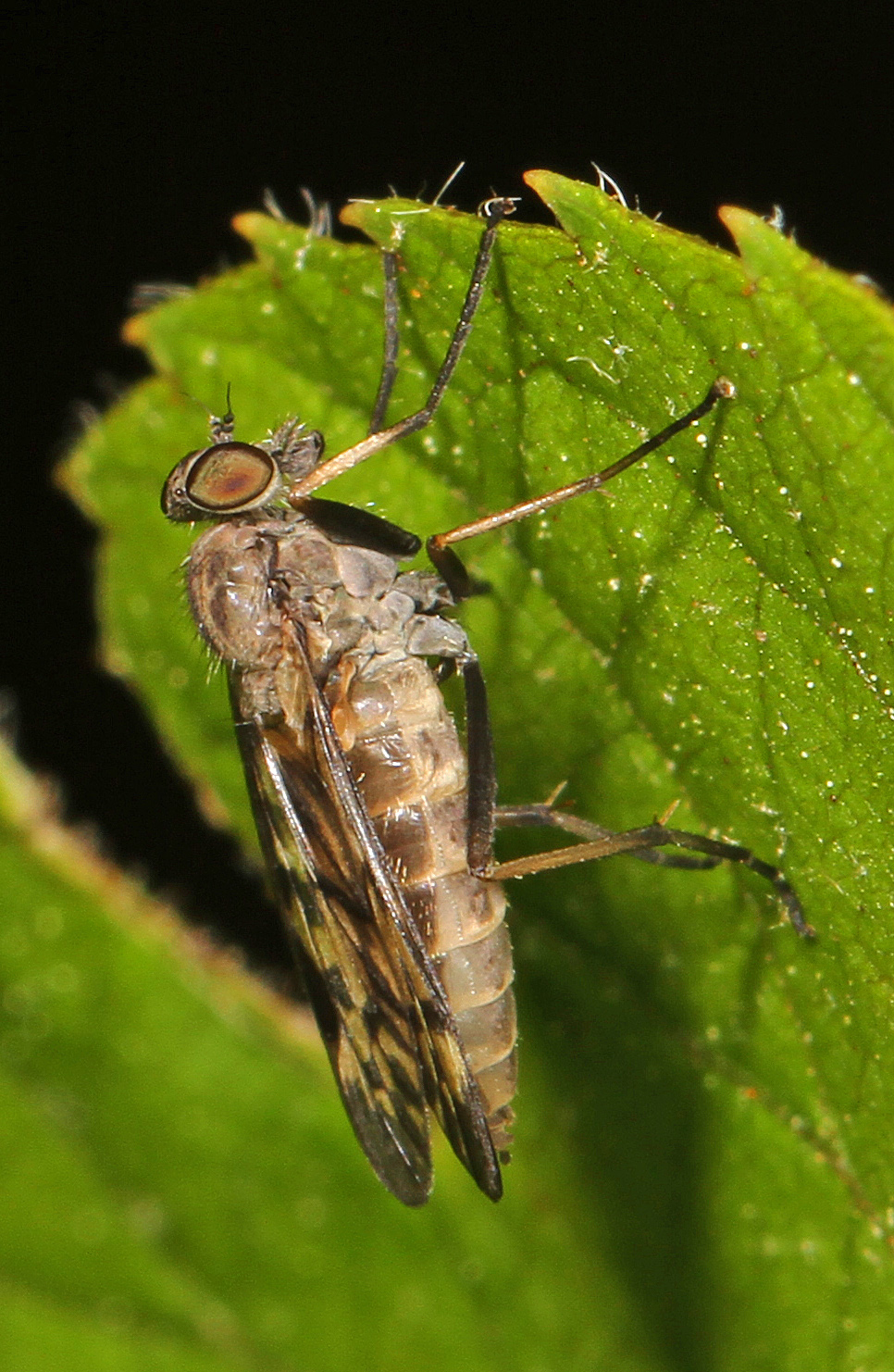

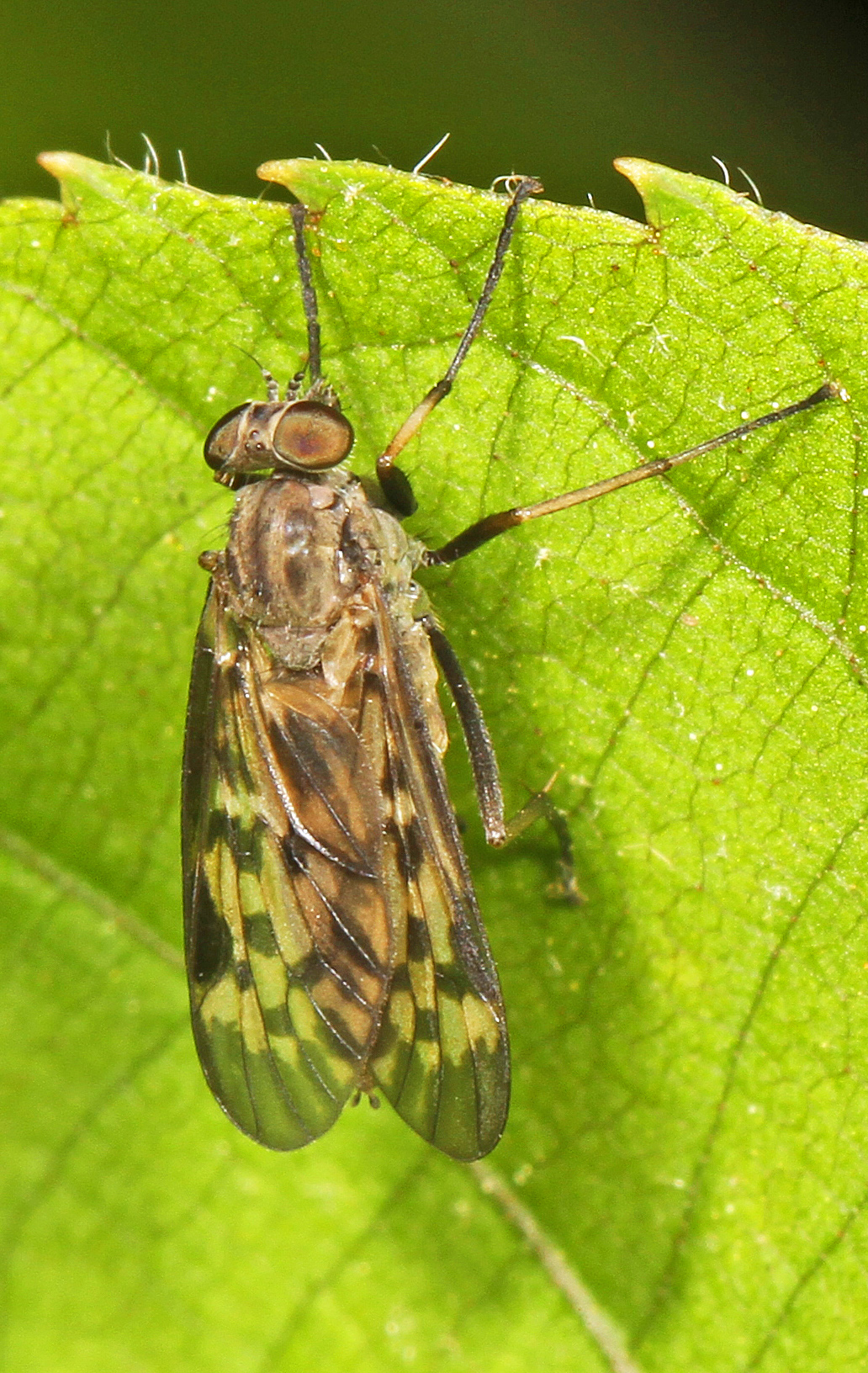
