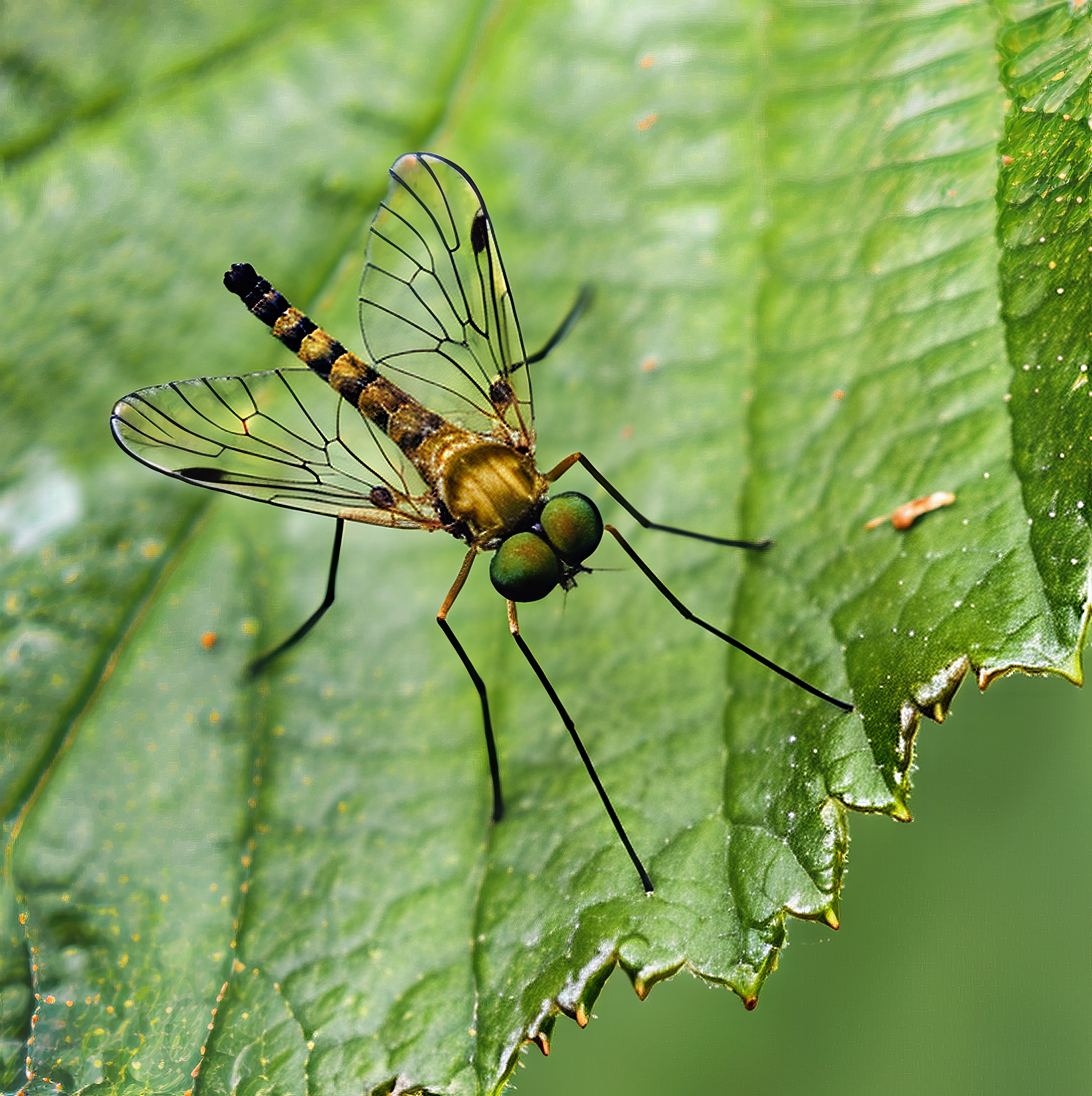
- Rhagio lineola up view on Rubus ulmifolius

Scientific classification
- Kingdom: Animalia
- Phylum: Arthropoda
- Class: Insecta
- Order: Diptera
- Family: Rhagionidae
- Genus: Rhagio
- Species: R. lineola

Binomial name
- Rhagio lineola Fabricius, 1794

= Rhagio lineola =

Species of fly

Rhagio lineola is a species of 'snipe flies' belonging to the family Rhagionidae. It is a Palearctic species with a limited distribution in Europe.

== Description ==
Rhagio lineola is a small species (6 mm.). The legs are mainly yellowish, with a broad brown band on the fore and hind femora (some Irish specimens have this pattern almost obscured by dark colour (var. monticola Verrall)). The body is covered with short, yellowish hairs. The scutellum is yellow, grey at the base.

== Biology ==
Often found on leaves of undergrowth in woodland. The flight season is long, from May until October.
