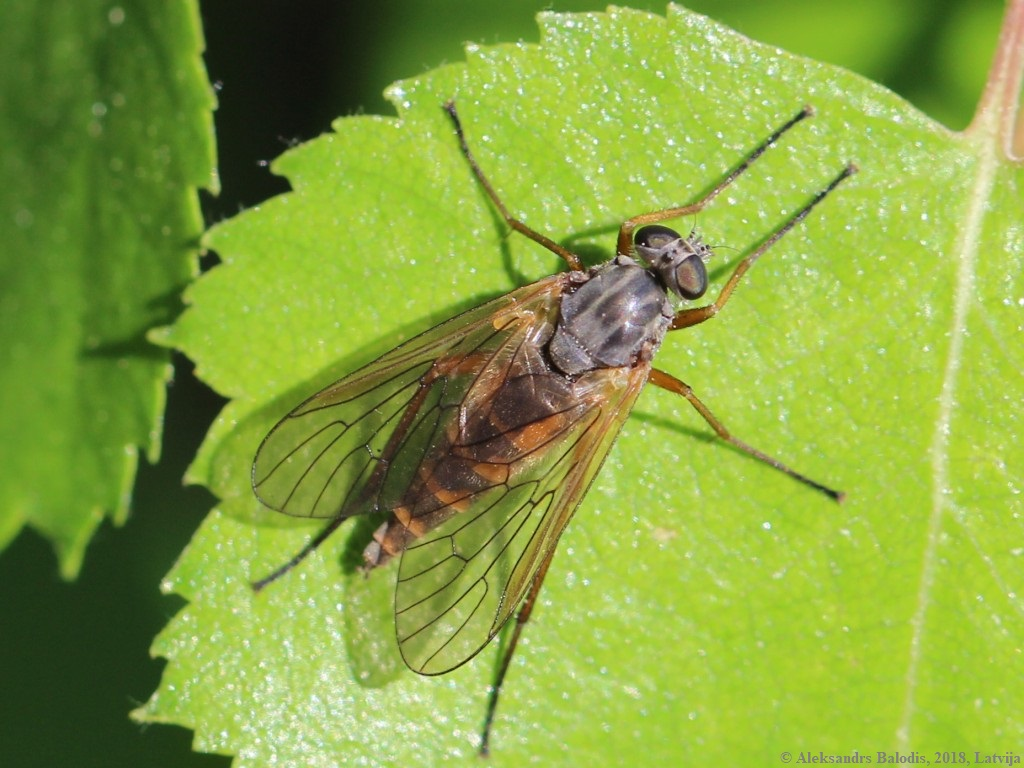
- Rhagio annulatus Latvia

Scientific classification
- Kingdom: Animalia
- Phylum: Arthropoda
- Clade: Pancrustacea
- Class: Insecta
- Order: Diptera
- Family: Rhagionidae
- Genus: Rhagio
- Species: R. annulatus

Binomial name
- Rhagio annulatus (De Geer, 1776)

= Rhagio annulatus =

Species of fly

Rhagio annulatus is a Palearctic species of snipe fly in the family Rhagionidae. Resembles other Rhagio with unpatterned wings and no stigma but the fore coxae are grey, with thick, white hairs. Pubescence of thorax and abdomen pale. The first tergite visible is entirely black.
