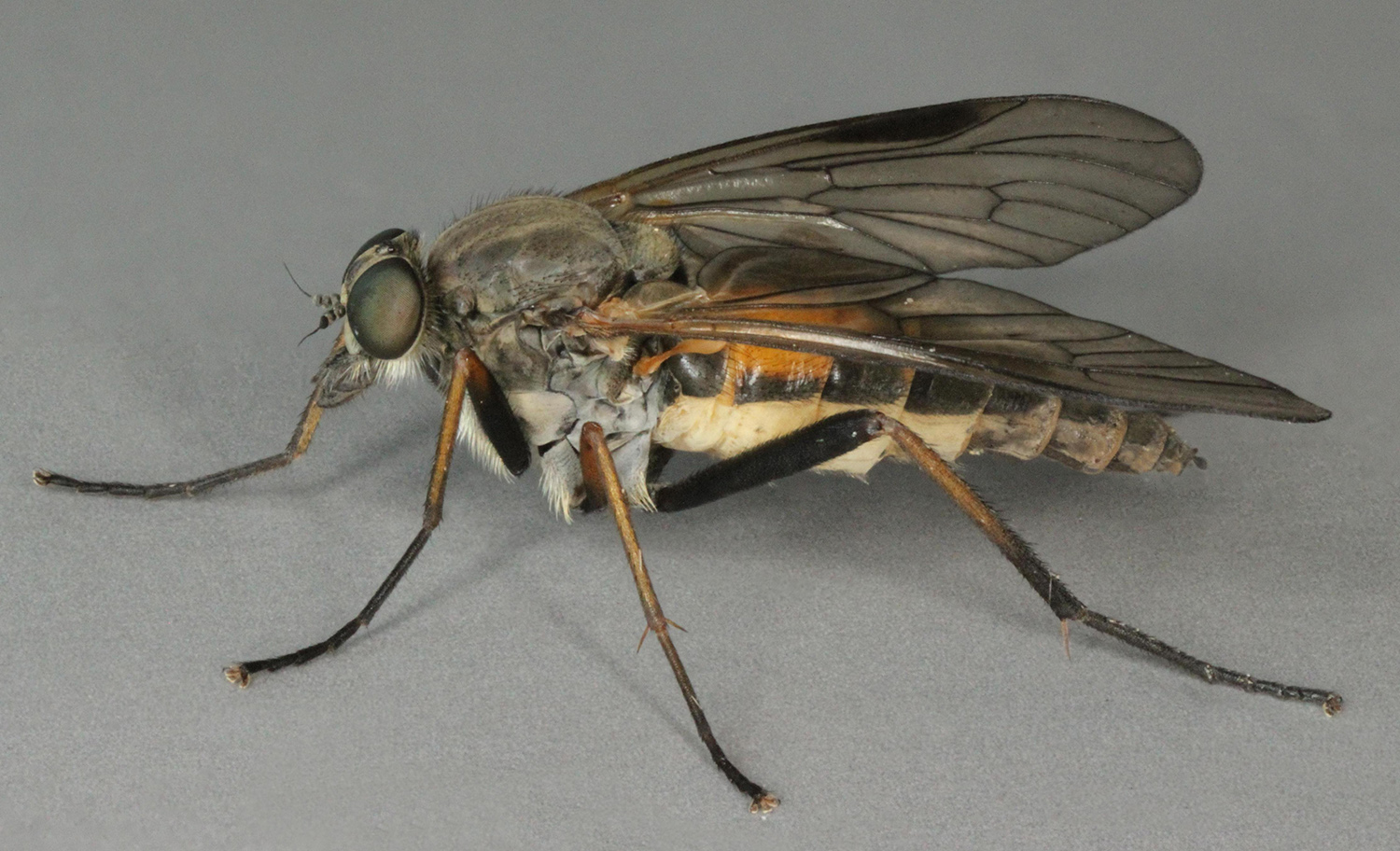
- Rhagio notatus female, North Wales

Scientific classification
- Kingdom: Animalia
- Phylum: Arthropoda
- Clade: Pancrustacea
- Class: Insecta
- Order: Diptera
- Family: Rhagionidae
- Genus: Rhagio
- Species: R. notatus

Binomial name
- Rhagio notatus (Meigen, 1820)

= Rhagio notatus =

Species of fly

Rhagio notatus is a Palearctic species of snipe fly in the family Rhagionidae. In this Rhagio the scutellum is completely grey without yellowish marks at the base or on the sides. The legs are mostly dark except at the base of the femurs.The wings are unspotted with a well-defined dark stigma. - Length 8-11 mm. June-July. In Central and northern Europe it is found in June and July.
