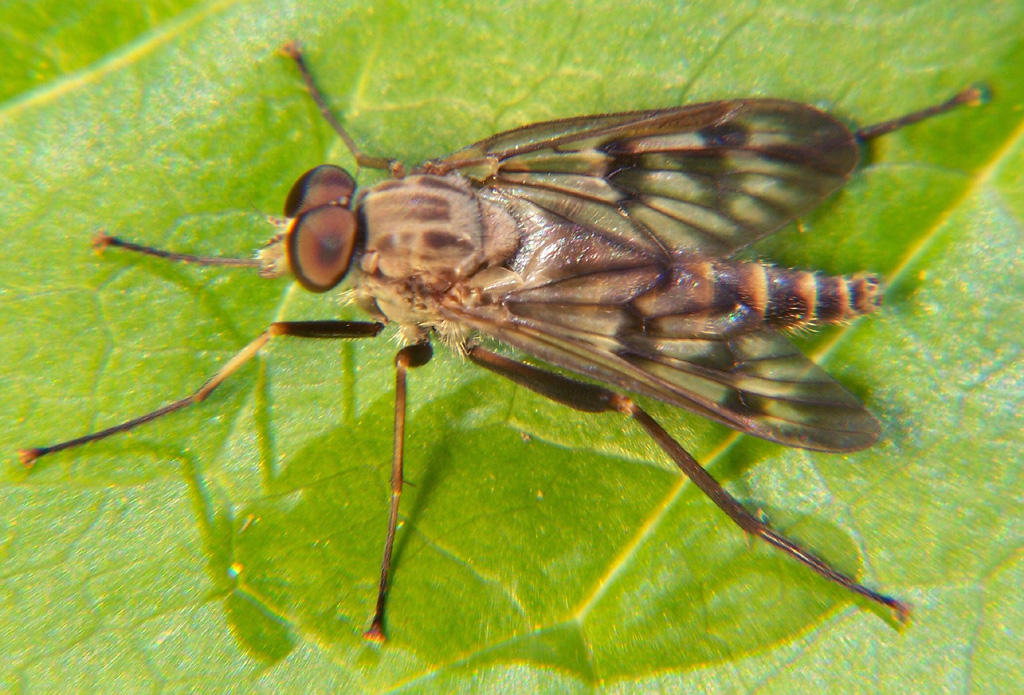
- Rhagio mystaceus

Scientific classification
- Kingdom: Animalia
- Phylum: Arthropoda
- Class: Insecta
- Order: Diptera
- Family: Rhagionidae
- Subfamily: Rhagioninae
- Genus: Rhagio; Fabricius, 1775

Type species
- Musca scolopacea Linnaeus, 1758

Species
- see text

Synonyms
- Leptis Fabricius, 1805

= Rhagio =

Genus of flies

Rhagio is a worldwide genus of predatory snipe flies. Several species in this genus are referred to as downlooker or down-looker flies because they sometimes perch on tree trunks in a head-down position. There are approximately 170 species. They can be distinguished from other rhagionids by the open anal cell on the wings and the lack of a kidney-shaped arista.

Furia ithacensis is a species of the pathogenic fungus in America that causes a fatal disease in flies, specifically snipe flies.

== Species ==
- Rhagio acutatus Yang, Dong & Zhang, 2016
- Rhagio albibarbis (Bigot, 1887)
- Rhagio albicornis (Say, 1823)
- Rhagio albipilosus Becker, 1921
- Rhagio albus Yang, Yang & Nagatomi, 1997
- Rhagio algericus (Becker, 1906)
- Rhagio alumnus Walker, 1852
- Rhagio amurensis Makarkin, 1992
- Rhagio annulatus (De Geer, 1776)
- Rhagio apiciflavus Yang & Yang, 1991
- Rhagio apiciniger Yang, Zhu & Gao, 2005
- Rhagio apicipennis (Brunetti, 1909)
- Rhagio arcuatus (Meijere, 1911)
- Rhagio astictus Yang & Yang, 1994
- Rhagio aterrimus Zeegers & Álvarez, 2016
- Rhagio balcanicus (Strobl, 1902)
- Rhagio basalis (Philippi, 1865)
- Rhagio basiflavus Yang & Yang, 1993
- Rhagio basimaculatus Yang & Yang, 1993
- Rhagio basiniger Yang, Dong & Zhang, 2016
- Rhagio bawanglinganus Yang, Dong & Zhang, 2016
- Rhagio beckeri Lindner, 1923
- †Rhagio bifurcatus (Meunier, 1902)
- Rhagio biroi Szilády, 1934
- Rhagio bisectus Yang, Yang & Nagatomi, 1997
- Rhagio bitaeniatus (Bellardi, 1862)
- Rhagio brunneipennis Leonard, 1930
- Rhagio calcaratus Statz, 1940
- Rhagio californicus Leonard, 1930
- Rhagio capnopterus (Wiedemann, 1828)
- Rhagio cavannae (Bezzi, 1898)
- Rhagio centrimaculatus Yang & Yang, 1993
- Rhagio chillcotti James, 1965
- Rhagio chonganus Yang, Dong & Zhang, 2016
- Rhagio chongqinensis Yang, Dong & Zhang, 2016
- Rhagio choui Yang & Yang, 1997
- Rhagio chrysopilaeformis (Bezzi, 1898)
- Rhagio chrysostigma (Loew, 1857)
- Rhagio cinerascens (Röder, 1884)
- Rhagio cinereus (Zetterstedt, 1842)
- Rhagio cingulatus (Loew, 1856)
- Rhagio conspicuus Meigen, 1804
- Rhagio corsicanus Becker, 1910
- Rhagio costalis Matsumura, 1911
- Rhagio costatus (Loew, 1862)
- Rhagio costimaculatus Matsumura, 1916
- Rhagio crassitibia Yang, Dong & Zhang, 2016
- Rhagio dashahensis Yang, Dong & Zhang, 2016
- Rhagio dichromaticus Chillcott, 1965
- Rhagio difficilis Becker, 1921
- Rhagio dimidiatus (Loew, 1863)
- Rhagio discoidalis (Brunetti, 1912)
- Rhagio dulonjianganus Yang, Dong & Zhang, 2016
- Rhagio elenae Soboleva, 1991
- Rhagio expansus James, 1964
- †Rhagio expassus (Meunier, 1910)
- †Rhagio exporrectus (Meunier, 1910)
- †Rhagio expositus (Meunier, 1910)
- †Rhagio exsanguis Meunier, 1910
- Rhagio fanjingshanus Yang, Dong & Zhang, 2016
- †Rhagio fascinatoris (Meunier, 1910)
- Rhagio ferruginosus ssp. griseicollis Frey, 1954
- Rhagio ferus (Meunier, 1910)
- Rhagio flavicornis (Macquart, 1826)
- Rhagio flavimarginatus Yang, Dong & Zhang, 2016
- Rhagio flavimedius (Coquillett, 1898)
- Rhagio floralis Panzer, 1804
- Rhagio floreus Panzer, 1804
- Rhagio floridensis Chillcott, 1965
- Rhagio formosus Bezzi, 1912
- †Rhagio fossitius Melander, 1949
- Rhagio freyae Lindner, 1923
- Rhagio fuscus (Wiedemann, 1828)
- Rhagio fuscipennis (Meigen, 1820)
- Rhagio gansuensis Yang & Yang, 1997
- Rhagio gracilis (Johnson, 1912)
- Rhagio graeculus (Loew, 1869)
- Rhagio grandis Szilády, 1934
- Rhagio guadarramensis Strobl, 1909
- Rhagio guangxiensis Yang & Yang, 1993
- Rhagio guizhouensis Yang & Yang, 1992
- Rhagio hainanensis Yang & Yang, 1997
- Rhagio hangzhouensis Yang & Yang, 1989
- Rhagio henanensis Yang, Zhu & Gao, 2002
- Rhagio houae Yang, Dong & Zhang, 2016
- Rhagio huangi Yang, Dong & Zhang, 2016
- Rhagio huashanensis Yang & Yang, 1997
- Rhagio hyaloptera (Wiedemann, 1828)
- Rhagio idaeus Bezzi, 1908
- Rhagio immaculatus (Meigen, 1804)
- Rhagio incisus (Loew, 1872)
- Rhagio insularis Becker, 1921
- Rhagio inurbana (Aldrich, 1915)
- Rhagio inutilis Walker, 1848
- Rhagio iriomotensis Nagatomi & Nagatomi, 1990
- Rhagio itoi Nagatomi, 1952
- Rhagio japonicus Matsumura, 1916
- Rhagio javanus Lindner, 1925
- Rhagio jinxiuensis Yang & Yang, 1993
- Rhagio karafutonis Matsumura, 1916
- Rhagio korinchiensis Edwards, 1919
- Rhagio latifrons Yang, Dong & Zhang, 2016
- Rhagio latipennis (Loew, 1856)
- Rhagio libanonicus Szilády, 1934
- Rhagio lineola Fabricius, 1794
- Rhagio longshengensis Yang & Yang, 1993
- Rhagio longzhouensis Yang & Yang, 1993
- Rhagio lugens (Philippi, 1865)
- Rhagio luteus Soboleva, 1984
- Rhagio lutifaciatus Okada, 1941
- Rhagio maculatus (De Geer, 1776)
- Rhagio maculifer (Bigot, 1887)
- Rhagio maculipennis (Loew, 1854)
- Rhagio maolanus Yang & Yang, 1993
- Rhagio matsumurae Lindner, 1923
- Rhagio medeae Iacob, 1971
- Rhagio meridionalis Yang & Yang, 1993
- Rhagio miyonis Nagatomi, 1952
- Rhagio mongolicus Lindner, 1923
- Rhagio montanus Becker, 1921
- Rhagio montivagus Edwards, 1919
- Rhagio morulus Nagatomi, 1971
- Rhagio mystaceus (Macquart, 1840)
- Rhagio naganensis Nagatomi, 1952
- Rhagio nagatomii Yang & Yang, 1997
- Rhagio napoensis Yang, Dong & Zhang, 2016
- Rhagio neimengensis Yang, Dong & Zhang, 2016
- Rhagio niger (Meigen & Wiedemann, 1820)
- Rhagio nigratus (Philippi, 1865)
- Rhagio nigrifemur Yang, Dong & Zhang, 2016
- Rhagio nigritibia Yang, Dong & Zhang, 2016
- Rhagio ningminganus Yang & Yang, 1993
- Rhagio notatus (Meigen, 1820)
- Rhagio ochraceus (Loew, 1862)
- Rhagio olgae Soboleva, 1991
- Rhagio olsufjevi Soboleva, 1989
- Rhagio orestes Chillcott, 1965
- Rhagio pallidipennis Becker, 1921
- Rhagio pallidistigma (Meijere, 1924)
- Rhagio pallipilosus Yang, Zhu & Gao, 2005
- Rhagio palpalis (Adams, 1904)
- Rhagio perdicaceus Frey, 1954
- Rhagio petrovae Soboleva, 1989
- Rhagio philippinensis Frey, 1954
- Rhagio pilosus Yang, Yang & Nagatomi, 1997
- Rhagio plumbeus Say, 1823
- Rhagio poecilopterus Bezzi, 1908
- Rhagio politaeniatus (Bellardi, 1862)
- Rhagio pollinosus Leonard, 1930
- Rhagio pseudastictus Yang & Yang, 1994
- Rhagio puellaris Nagatomi, 1971
- Rhagio pullatus (Coquillett, 1898)
- Rhagio punctipennis (Say, 1823)
- Rhagio rolandi Becker, 1921
- Rhagio rondanii Bezzi, 1908
- Rhagio sabahensis Nagatomi & Nagatomi, 1990
- †Rhagio samlandicus (Meunier, 1916)
- Rhagio sardous Szilády, 1934
- Rhagio scapulifer (Bigot, 1887)
- Rhagio schmidti Lindner, 1931
- Rhagio scolopaceus (Linnaeus, 1758)
- Rhagio separatus Yang, Yang & Nagatomi, 1997
- Rhagio shaanxiensis Yang & Yang, 1997
- Rhagio sheni Yang, Zhu & Gao, 2003
- Rhagio shennonganus Yang & Yang, 1991
- Rhagio shimai Nagatomi & Nagatomi, 1990
- Rhagio shiraki Szilády, 1934
- Rhagio sikisimanus Nagatomi, 1972
- Rhagio simushirus Soboleva, 1989
- Rhagio singularis Yang, Yang & Nagatomi, 1997
- Rhagio sinuatus Edwards, 1919
- Rhagio songae Yang, Dong & Zhang, 2016
- Rhagio sordidus (Loew, 1862)
- Rhagio stigmosus Yang, Yang & Nagatomi, 1997
- Rhagio strigosus Meigen, 1804
- Rhagio subannulatus (Philippi, 1865)
- Rhagio subpilosus (Becker, 1892)
- Rhagio taorminae Becker, 1921
- Rhagio terminalis (Loew, 1861)
- Rhagio tipuliformis Fabricius, 1794
- Rhagio tonsa (Loew, 1869)
- Rhagio triangulatus (Brunetti, 1920)
- Rhagio tringarius (Linnaeus, 1758)
- Rhagio tuberculatus Yang, Yang & Nagatomi, 1997
- Rhagio turcicus Lindner, 1931
- Rhagio unicolor (Brunetti, 1912)
- Rhagio uniguttatus (Osten Sacken, 1881)
- Rhagio validus (Meunier, 1899)
- Rhagio venetianus Becker, 1921
- Rhagio vermileonoides Frey, 1954
- Rhagio vertebratus (Say, 1823)
- Rhagio wenxianus Yang, Zhu & Gao, 2005
- †Rhagio wheeleri Melander, 1949
- Rhagio wuyishanus Yang, Dong & Zhang, 2016
- Rhagio xanthodes Yang, Dong & Zhang, 2016
- Rhagio yasumatsui Nagatomi, 1972
- Rhagio zhaoae Yang, Dong & Zhang, 2016
- Rhagio zhejiangensis Yang & Yang, 1989
- Rhagio zhuae Yang, Dong & Zhang, 2016

== Gallery ==
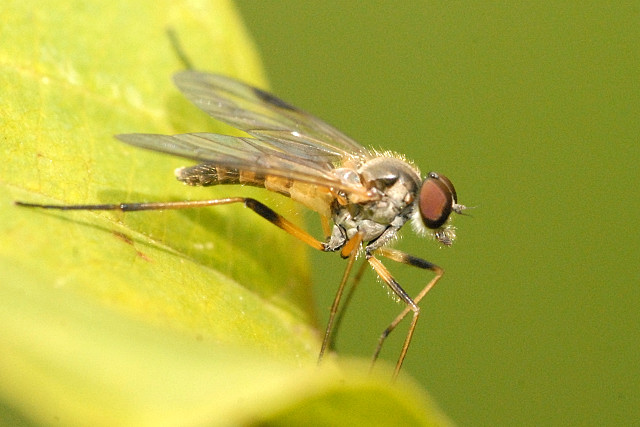
Rhagio lineola

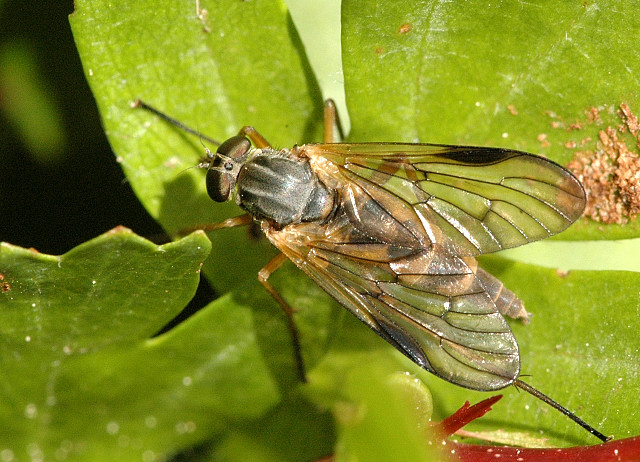
Rhagio notatus, female

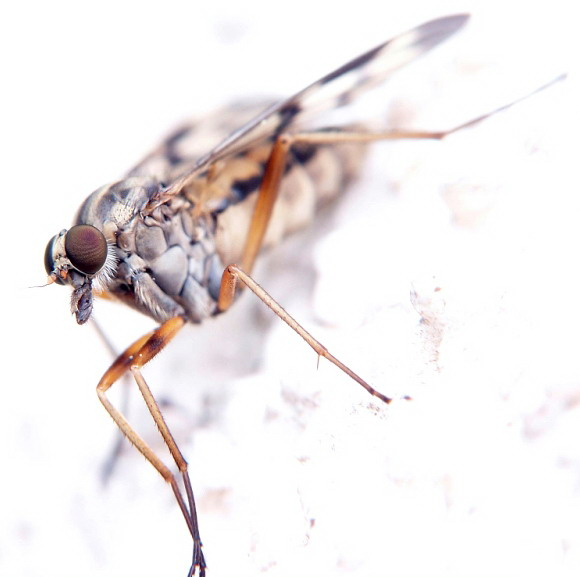
Rhagio scolopaceus

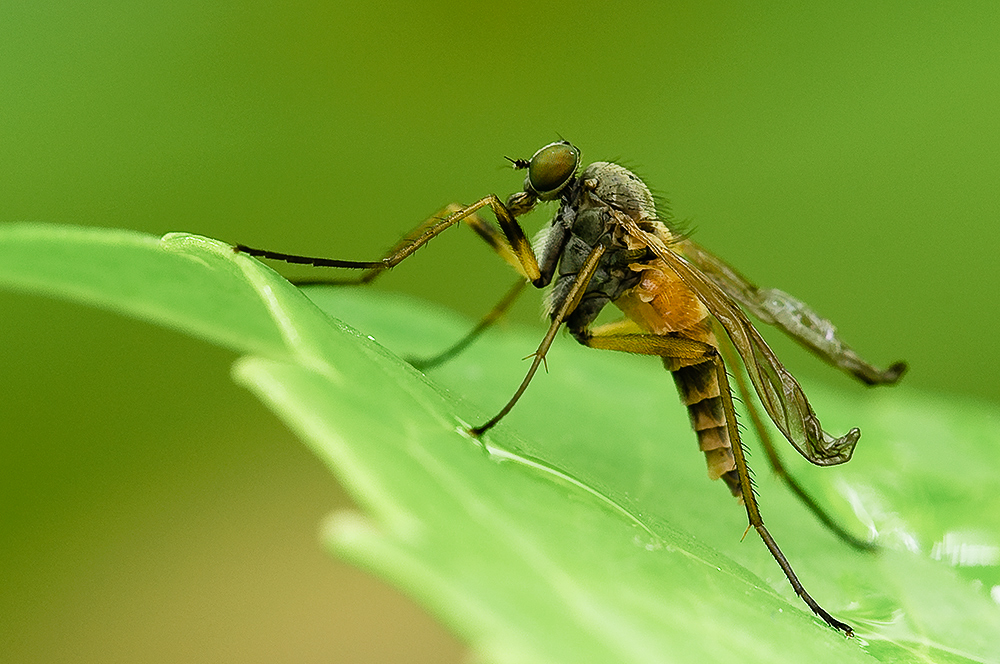
Rhagio sp.

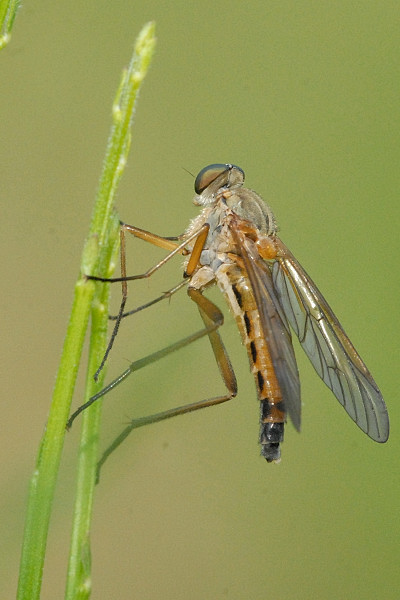
Rhagio tringarius, male

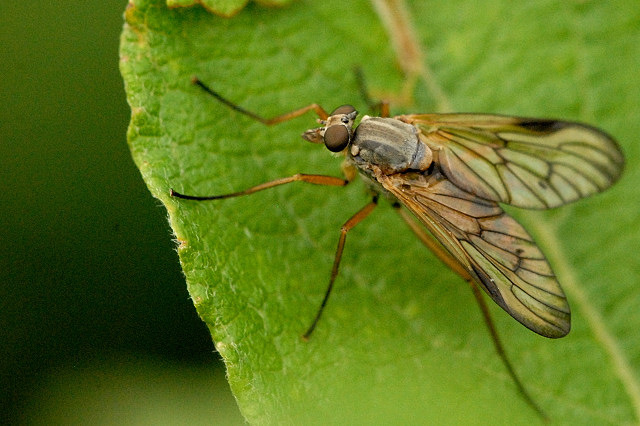
Rhagio vitripennis
