= Rhagio gracilis =

Scientific classification
- Domain: Eukaryota
- Kingdom: Animalia
- Phylum: Arthropoda
- Class: Insecta
- Order: Diptera
- Family: Rhagionidae
- Genus: Rhagio
- Species: R. gracilis

Binomial name
- Rhagio gracilis (Johnson, 1912)

Synonyms
- Leptis gracilis Johnson, 1912

Species of fly

Rhagio gracilis is a species of snipe flies in the family Rhagionidae.
