= List of Nemotelus species =

This is a list of 193 species in Nemotelus, a genus of soldier flies in the family Stratiomyidae.

== Nemotelus species ==
- Nemotelus abdominalis Adams, 1903
- Nemotelus acutirostris Loew, 1863
- Nemotelus aerosus Gimmerthal, 1847
- Nemotelus albimarginatus James, 1936
- Nemotelus albirostris Macquart, 1850
- Nemotelus albitarsis Lindner, 1965
- Nemotelus albiventris Thomson, 1869
- Nemotelus aldrichi (Williston, 1917)
- Nemotelus alida Lindner, 1966
- Nemotelus anchora Loew, 1846
- Nemotelus angustemarginatus Pleske, 1937
- Nemotelus annulipes Pleske, 1937
- Nemotelus arabistanicus Pleske, 1937
- Nemotelus arator Melander, 1903
- Nemotelus argentifer Loew, 1846
- Nemotelus aridus Hanson, 1963
- Nemotelus armeniacus Pleske, 1937
- Nemotelus aschuricus Pleske, 1937
- Nemotelus atbassaricus Pleske, 1937
- Nemotelus atriceps Loew, 1856
- Nemotelus aureus Lindner, 1966
- Nemotelus aviceps James, 1974
- Nemotelus barracloughi (Mason, 1997)
- Nemotelus basilaris Woodley, 2001
- Nemotelus beameri James, 1933
- Nemotelus beckeri Hauser, 1998
- Nemotelus bellulus Melander, 1903
- Nemotelus biondii Mason, 1997
- Nemotelus bipunctatus Loew, 1846
- Nemotelus bomynensis Pleske, 1937
- Nemotelus bonnarius Johnson, 1912
- Nemotelus brevirostris Meigen, 1822
- Nemotelus bruesii Melander, 1903
- Nemotelus canadensis Loew, 1863
- Nemotelus candidus Becker, 1906
- Nemotelus capensis Walker, 1851
- Nemotelus carthaginis Becker, 1906
- Nemotelus catharistis Lindner, 1930
- Nemotelus centralis Hanson, 1958
- Nemotelus chaineyi Mason, 1997
- Nemotelus chilensis James, 1974
- Nemotelus chlorhimas James, 1974
- Nemotelus cingulatus Dufour, 1852
- Nemotelus clunipes Lindner, 1960
- Nemotelus cochraneae Mason, 1997
- Nemotelus communis Hanson, 1958
- Nemotelus congruens Kertész, 1914
- Nemotelus consentiens Lindner, 1959
- Nemotelus convexiceps James, 1974
- Nemotelus crenatus Egger, 1859
- Nemotelus crinitus Hanson, 1963
- Nemotelus curdistanus Szilády, 1941
- Nemotelus cylindricornis Rozkošný, 1977
- Nemotelus cypriacus Lindner, 1937
- Nemotelus dampfi James, 1941
- Nemotelus danielssoni Mason, 1989
- Nemotelus dentatus Becker, 1902
- Nemotelus diehli Lindner, 1941
- Nemotelus dimidiatus Lindner, 1935
- Nemotelus dissitus Cui, Zhang & Yang, 2009
- Nemotelus eburneopictus James, 1974
- Nemotelus exsul James, 1960
- Nemotelus exul (Walker, 1851)
- Nemotelus faciflavus Cui, Zhang & Yang, 2009
- Nemotelus fasciventris Becker, 1913
- Nemotelus flavicornis Johnson, 1894
- Nemotelus flavocingulatus Kertész, 1914
- Nemotelus fozzeri Mason, 1997
- Nemotelus frontosus (Hine, 1901)
- Nemotelus fuegensis James, 1974
- Nemotelus glaber Loew, 1872
- Nemotelus gobiensis Pleske, 1937
- Nemotelus grootaerti Mason, 1997
- Nemotelus haemorrhous Loew, 1857
- Nemotelus halophilus Hanson, 1958
- Nemotelus hansoni Mason, 1997
- Nemotelus heptapotamicus Pleske, 1937
- Nemotelus hirsutissimus James, 1974
- Nemotelus hirtulus Bigot, 1879
- Nemotelus hyalinibasis Lindner, 1966
- Nemotelus ilensis Pleske, 1937
- Nemotelus imitator (Kertész, 1923)
- Nemotelus immaculatus Johnson, 1895
- Nemotelus inconspicuus Pleske, 1933
- Nemotelus incurvatus James, 1974
- Nemotelus insularis Becker, 1908
- Nemotelus irwinorum Mason, 1997
- Nemotelus jakowlewi Pleske, 1937
- Nemotelus jamesi Hanson, 1958
- Nemotelus kansensis Adams, 1903
- Nemotelus knowltoni James, 1936
- Nemotelus kugleri Lindner, 1974
- Nemotelus lanatus James, 1974
- Nemotelus lasiops Loew, 1846
- Nemotelus latemarginatus Pleske, 1937
- Nemotelus latiusculus Loew, 1871
- Nemotelus lativentris Pleske, 1937
- Nemotelus londtorum Mason, 1997
- Nemotelus longirostris Wiedemann, 1824
- Nemotelus maculatus Kertész, 1914
- Nemotelus maculiventris Bigot, 1860
- Nemotelus madagascarensis James, 1975
- Nemotelus magellanicus James, 1974
- Nemotelus mandshuricus Pleske, 1937
- Nemotelus marinus Becker, 1902
- Nemotelus matilei Mason, 1997
- Nemotelus matrouhensis Mohammad, Fadl, Gadalla & Badrawy, 2009
- Nemotelus megarhynchus Pleske, 1937
- Nemotelus melanderi Banks, 1920
- Nemotelus mersinae Becker, 1915
- Nemotelus monensis Curran, 1928
- Nemotelus mongolia Woodley, 2001
- Nemotelus montanus James, 1936
- Nemotelus nanshanicus Pleske, 1937
- Nemotelus nartshukae Rozkošný & Vanhara, 2018
- Nemotelus neotropicus Curran, 1925
- Nemotelus neuquenensis Kertész, 1914
- Nemotelus nevadensis Hanson, 1963
- Nemotelus niger Bigot, 1879
- Nemotelus nigribasis Lindner, 1965
- Nemotelus nigricornis Kertész, 1914
- Nemotelus nigrifrons Loew, 1846
- Nemotelus nigrimana Lindner, 1966
- Nemotelus nigrinus Fallén, 1817
- Nemotelus notatus Zetterstedt, 1842
- Nemotelus nudus Kertész, 1914
- Nemotelus obscuripes Loew, 1871
- Nemotelus obtusirostris Lindner, 1943
- Nemotelus pallipes Say, 1823
- Nemotelus pantherina (Linnaeus, 1758)
- Nemotelus pappi Rozkošný, 1982
- Nemotelus penai James, 1974
- Nemotelus personatus Pleske, 1937
- Nemotelus peruvianus Kertész, 1914
- Nemotelus picinus Hanson, 1958
- Nemotelus planifrons Lindner, 1972
- Nemotelus poecilohimas James, 1974
- Nemotelus poecilorhynchus Pleske, 1937
- Nemotelus politus Hanson, 1958
- Nemotelus polyposus Say, 1829
- Nemotelus proboscideus Loew, 1846
- Nemotelus przewalskii Pleske, 1937
- Nemotelus psilonotus Hanson, 1963
- Nemotelus pulchricornis James, 1974
- Nemotelus pullus Loew, 1871
- Nemotelus pumilus Hanson, 1963
- Nemotelus punctifacies Becker, 1913
- Nemotelus quadrinotatus Johnson, 1913
- Nemotelus robertsonae Mason, 1997
- Nemotelus roedingeri Lindner, 1941
- Nemotelus rudifranci (Berezovsky & Nartshuk, 1993)
- Nemotelus ruficornis Bigot, 1879
- Nemotelus rufiventris Portschinsky, 1887
- Nemotelus rufoabdominalis Cole, 1923
- Nemotelus rugosus James, 1941
- Nemotelus rumelicus Beschovski & Manasieva, 1996
- Nemotelus sabroskyi Hanson, 1958
- Nemotelus shannoni James, 1974
- Nemotelus signatus Frivaldszky, 1855
- Nemotelus slossonae Johnson, 1895
- Nemotelus sordidus Kertész, 1914
- Nemotelus stuckenbergi Lindner, 1965
- Nemotelus subuliginosus Rozkošný, 1974
- Nemotelus svenhedini Lindner, 1933
- Nemotelus syriacus Lindner, 1937
- Nemotelus tenuistylus Hanson, 1958
- Nemotelus tenuivena James, 1974
- Nemotelus thomae Curran, 1928
- Nemotelus titschacki Lindner, 1941
- Nemotelus transsylvanicus (Kertész, 1923)
- Nemotelus tristis Bigot, 1887
- Nemotelus tschorsnigi (Mason, 1997)
- Nemotelus turkestanicus Pleske, 1937
- Nemotelus uliginosus (Linnaeus, 1767)
- Nemotelus variabilis Hanson, 1958
- Nemotelus vertebratus James, 1974
- Nemotelus victoriskusnezowi Pleske, 1937
- Nemotelus wilfordhansoni Woodley, 2001
- Nemotelus xinjiangensis Cui, Zhang & Yang, 2009
- Nemotelus zichyi Kertész, 1901
