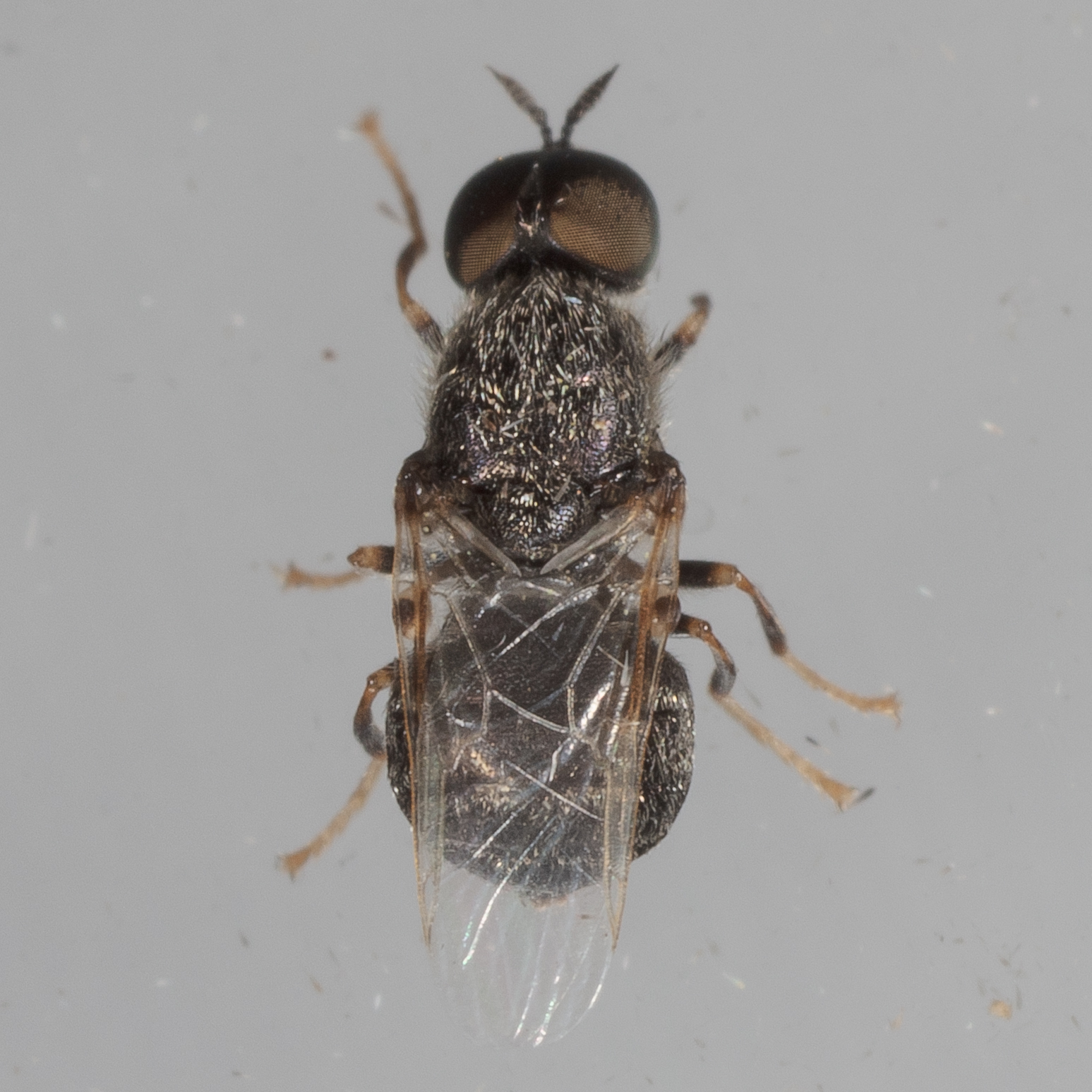

Scientific classification
- Kingdom: Animalia
- Phylum: Arthropoda
- Class: Insecta
- Order: Diptera
- Family: Stratiomyidae
- Subfamily: Nemotelinae
- Genus: Nemotelus
- Subgenus: Nemotelus
- Species: N. bruesii

Binomial name
- Nemotelus bruesii Melander, 1903

Synonyms
- Nemotelus bruesi Curran, 1927

= Nemotelus bruesii =

Species of fly

Nemotelus bruesii, the Brues' soldier fly, is a species of soldier fly in the family Stratiomyidae.

== Distribution ==
United States.
