= Nemotelus brevirostris =

Scientific classification
- Kingdom: Animalia
- Phylum: Arthropoda
- Class: Insecta
- Order: Diptera
- Family: Stratiomyidae
- Subfamily: Nemotelinae
- Genus: Nemotelus
- Subgenus: Nemotelus
- Species: N. brevirostris

Binomial name
- Nemotelus brevirostris Meigen, 1822

Synonyms
- Nemotelus globuliceps Loew, 1846; Nemotelus pseudoglobuliceps Pleske, 1937; Nemotelus reichardti Pleske, 1937

Species of fly

Nemotelus brevirostris is a species of soldier fly in the family Stratiomyidae.

== Distribution ==
Austria, Bulgaria, Czech Republic, Germany, Greece, Hungary, Kazakhstan, Mongolia, Poland, Romania, Russia, Slovakia, Turkey, Yugoslavia.
