= Nemotelus lasiops =

Scientific classification
- Kingdom: Animalia
- Phylum: Arthropoda
- Class: Insecta
- Order: Diptera
- Family: Stratiomyidae
- Subfamily: Nemotelinae
- Genus: Nemotelus
- Subgenus: Nemotelus
- Species: N. lasiops

Binomial name
- Nemotelus lasiops Loew, 1846

Synonyms
- Nemotelus striativentris Lindner, 1937

Species of fly

Nemotelus lasiops is a species of soldier fly in the family Stratiomyidae.

== Distribution ==
Italy, Tunisia.
