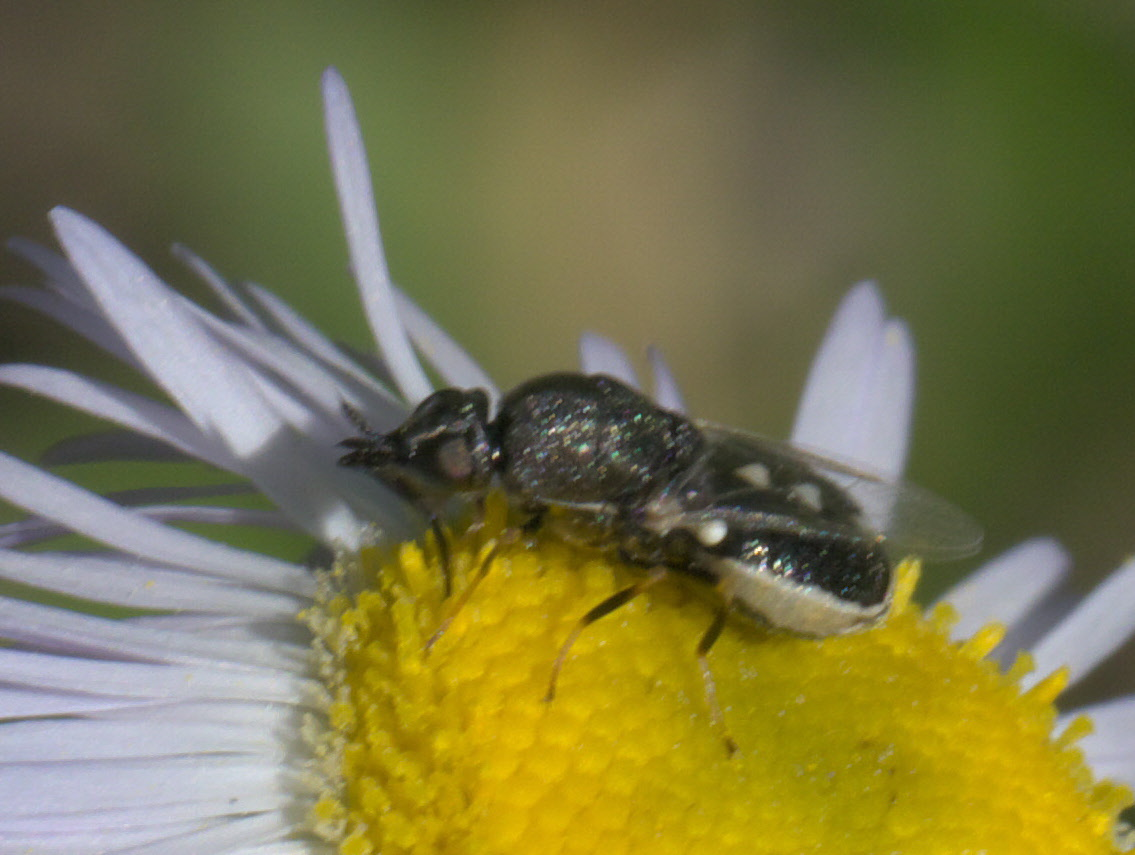

Scientific classification
- Kingdom: Animalia
- Phylum: Arthropoda
- Class: Insecta
- Order: Diptera
- Family: Stratiomyidae
- Subfamily: Nemotelinae
- Genus: Nemotelus
- Subgenus: Nemotelus
- Species: N. kansensis

Binomial name
- Nemotelus kansensis Adams, 1903

Synonyms
- Nemotelus plesius Curran, 1927; Nemotelus trinotatus Melander, 1903

= Nemotelus kansensis =

Species of fly

Nemotelus kansensis is a species of soldier fly in the family Stratiomyidae.

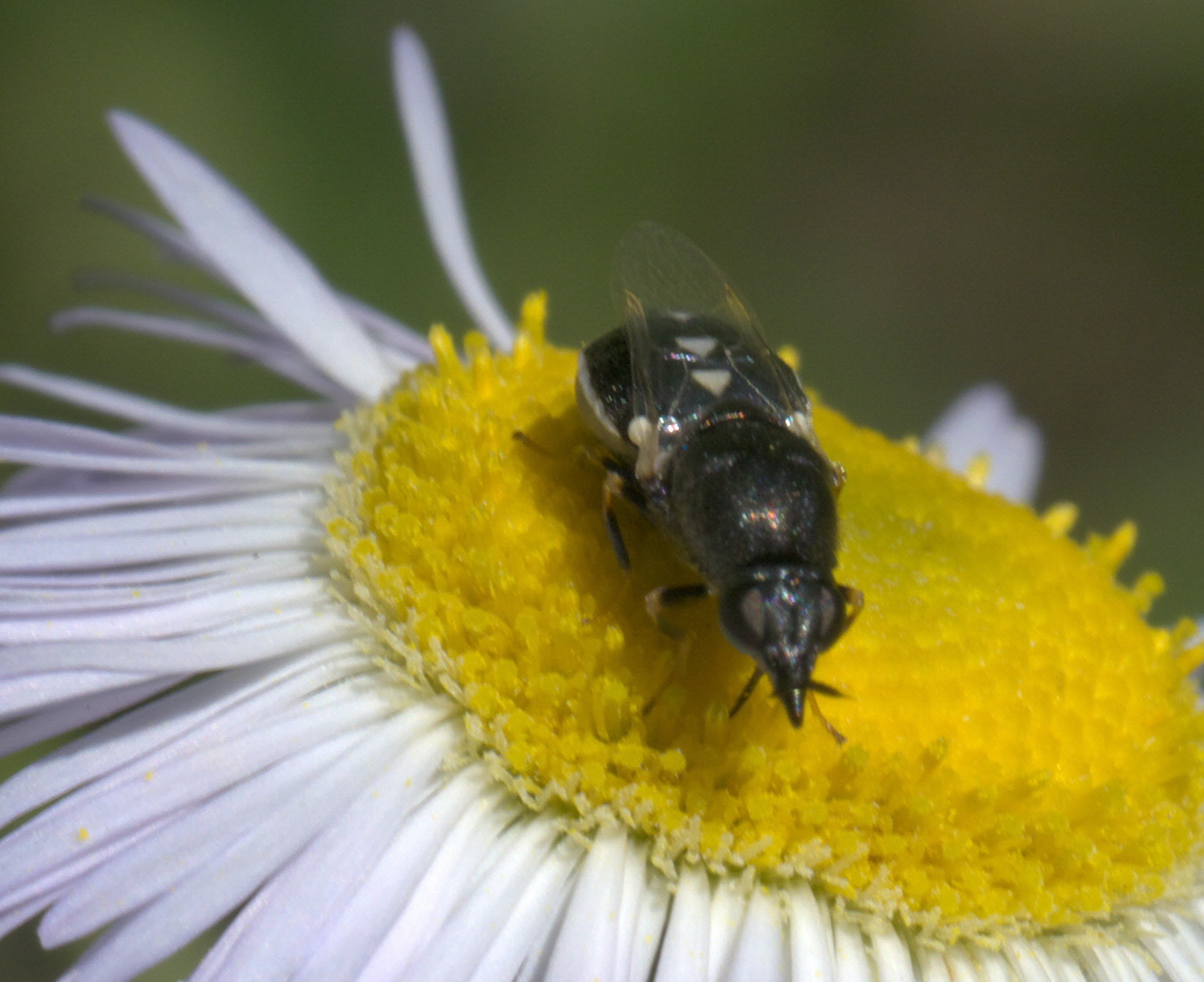

== Distribution ==
Canada, United States.
