= Nemotelus maculatus =

Scientific classification
- Kingdom: Animalia
- Phylum: Arthropoda
- Class: Insecta
- Order: Diptera
- Family: Stratiomyidae
- Genus: Nemotelus
- Subgenus: Camptopelta
- Species: N. maculatus

Binomial name
- Nemotelus maculatus Kertész, 1914

Species of fly

Nemotelus maculatus is a species of soldier fly in the family Stratiomyidae.

== Distribution ==
Argentina.
