= Nemotelus proboscideus =

Scientific classification
- Kingdom: Animalia
- Phylum: Arthropoda
- Class: Insecta
- Order: Diptera
- Family: Stratiomyidae
- Subfamily: Nemotelinae
- Genus: Nemotelus
- Subgenus: Nemotelus
- Species: N. proboscideus

Binomial name
- Nemotelus proboscideus Loew, 1846

Synonyms
- Nemotelus algericus Jaennicke, 1866; Nemotelus proboscidens Lindner, 1937

Species of fly

Nemotelus proboscideus is a species of soldier fly in the family Stratiomyidae.

== Distribution ==
Algeria, Italy, Libya, Tunisia.
