= Nemotelus abdominalis =

Scientific classification
- Kingdom: Animalia
- Phylum: Arthropoda
- Class: Insecta
- Order: Diptera
- Family: Stratiomyidae
- Subfamily: Nemotelinae
- Genus: Nemotelus
- Subgenus: Nemotelus
- Species: N. abdominalis

Binomial name
- Nemotelus abdominalis Adams, 1903

Species of fly

Nemotelus abdominalis is a species of soldier fly in the family Stratiomyidae.

== Distribution ==
Canada, United States.
