= Nemotelus arator =

Scientific classification
- Kingdom: Animalia
- Phylum: Arthropoda
- Class: Insecta
- Order: Diptera
- Family: Stratiomyidae
- Genus: Nemotelus
- Subgenus: Camptopelta
- Species: N. arator

Binomial name
- Nemotelus arator Melander, 1903

Species of fly

Nemotelus arator is a species of soldier fly in the family Stratiomyidae.

== Distribution ==
United States.
