= Nemotelus congruens =

Scientific classification
- Kingdom: Animalia
- Phylum: Arthropoda
- Class: Insecta
- Order: Diptera
- Family: Stratiomyidae
- Genus: Nemotelus
- Subgenus: Camptopelta
- Species: N. congruens

Binomial name
- Nemotelus congruens Kertész, 1914

Synonyms
- Nemotelus basalis Kertész, 1914; Nemotelus disjunctus Curran, 1925

Species of fly

Nemotelus congruens is a species of soldier fly in the family Stratiomyidae.

== Distribution ==
Peru, Chile.
