= Nemotelus argentifer =

Scientific classification
- Kingdom: Animalia
- Phylum: Arthropoda
- Class: Insecta
- Order: Diptera
- Family: Stratiomyidae
- Subfamily: Nemotelinae
- Genus: Nemotelus
- Subgenus: Nemotelus
- Species: N. argentifer

Binomial name
- Nemotelus argentifer Loew, 1846

Synonyms
- Nemotelus limbatus Egger, 1859

Species of fly

Nemotelus argentifer is a species of soldier fly in the family Stratiomyidae.

== Distribution ==
Armenia, Bulgaria, Cyprus, Greece, Iran, Israel, Italy, Kazakhstan, Russia, Spain, Turkey, Ukraine, Yugoslavia.
