= Nemotelus anchora =

Scientific classification
- Kingdom: Animalia
- Phylum: Arthropoda
- Class: Insecta
- Order: Diptera
- Family: Stratiomyidae
- Subfamily: Nemotelinae
- Genus: Nemotelus
- Subgenus: Nemotelus
- Species: N. anchora

Binomial name
- Nemotelus anchora Loew, 1846

Synonyms
- Nemotelus siculus Jaennicke, 1866; Nemotelus persicus Pleske, 1937

Species of fly

Nemotelus anchora is a species of soldier fly in the family Stratiomyidae.

== Distribution ==
Algeria, Egypt, Iran, Israel, Italy, Malta, Russia, Tunisia.
