= Pselaphomyia =

Scientific classification
- Kingdom: Animalia
- Phylum: Arthropoda
- Class: Insecta
- Order: Diptera
- Family: Stratiomyidae
- Subfamily: Nemotelinae
- Genus: Pselaphomyia; Kertész, 1923

Type species
- Pselaphomyia picta Kertész, 1923

Genus of flies

Pselaphomyia is a genus of flies in the family Stratiomyidae.

== Species ==
- Pselaphomyia manselli Mason, 1997
- Pselaphomyia nigripennis (Bigot, 1887)
