= Lasiopa =

Scientific classification
- Kingdom: Animalia
- Phylum: Arthropoda
- Clade: Pancrustacea
- Class: Insecta
- Order: Diptera
- Family: Stratiomyidae
- Subfamily: Nemotelinae
- Genus: Lasiopa; Brullé, 1833

Type species
- Lasiopa peleteria Brullé, 1833

Synonyms
- Cyclogaster Macquart, 1834; Lisopa Schiner, 1855; Cydogaster Schiner, 1855; Inermyia Bigot, 1856; Inermia Marschall, 1873; Neotropicalias Kirkaldy, 1910; Anodontoncus Speiser, 1920

Genus of flies

Lasiopa is a genus of flies in the family Stratiomyidae.

== Species ==
- Lasiopa aksarayiensis Üstüner & Hasbenli, 2014
- Lasiopa aktasii Üstüner & Hasbenli, 2014
- Lasiopa balius (Walker, 1849)
- Lasiopa benoisti Séguy, 1930
- Lasiopa calva (Meigen & Wiedemann, 1822)
- Lasiopa carpenteri James, 1937
- Lasiopa caucasica (Pleske, 1901)
- Lasiopa edentula (Wiedemann, 1824)
- Lasiopa krkensis Lindner, 1938
- Lasiopa manni Mik, 1882
- Lasiopa martinezi Mason, 1997
- Lasiopa pantherina Séguy, 1930
- Lasiopa peleteria Brullé, 1833
- Lasiopa pseudovillosa Rozkošný, 1983
- Lasiopa rhodesiensis (Lindner, 1952)
- Lasiopa rufitarsis Strobl, 1906
- Lasiopa tsacasi Dušek & Rozkošný, 1970
- Lasiopa villosa (Fabricius, 1794)
