= Nemotelus cingulatus =

Scientific classification
- Domain: Eukaryota
- Kingdom: Animalia
- Phylum: Arthropoda
- Class: Insecta
- Order: Diptera
- Family: Stratiomyidae
- Genus: Nemotelus
- Species: N. cingulatus

Binomial name
- Nemotelus cingulatus Dufour, 1852

Species of fly

Nemotelus cingulatus is a species of soldier fly described by Dufour in 1852.
