= Brachycara =

Scientific classification
- Kingdom: Animalia
- Phylum: Arthropoda
- Clade: Pancrustacea
- Class: Insecta
- Order: Diptera
- Family: Stratiomyidae
- Subfamily: Nemotelinae
- Genus: Brachycara; Thomson, 1869

Type species
- Brachycara ventralis Thomson, 1869

Synonyms
- Brachicara Marschall, 1873; Neurota Curran, 1931; Euryneurasoma Johnson, 1913

Genus of flies

Brachycara is a genus of flies in the family Stratiomyidae.

== Species ==
- Brachycara advena (Walker, 1851)
- Brachycara digitata James, 1966
- Brachycara grandis James, 1962
- Brachycara latifrons James, 1960
- Brachycara maculata (James, 1953)
- Brachycara slossonae (Johnson, 1913)
- Brachycara thomsoni Bezzi, 1928
- Brachycara ventralis Thomson, 1869
