= Nemotelus nigrifrons =

Scientific classification
- Kingdom: Animalia
- Phylum: Arthropoda
- Class: Insecta
- Order: Diptera
- Family: Stratiomyidae
- Subfamily: Nemotelinae
- Genus: Nemotelus
- Species: N. nigrifrons

Binomial name
- Nemotelus nigrifrons Loew, 1846

Synonyms
- Nemotelus tomentosus Becker, 1906

Species of fly

Nemotelus nigrifrons is a species of soldier fly in the family Stratiomyidae.

== Distribution ==
Algeria, Israel, Italy, Libya, Morocco, Tunisia.
