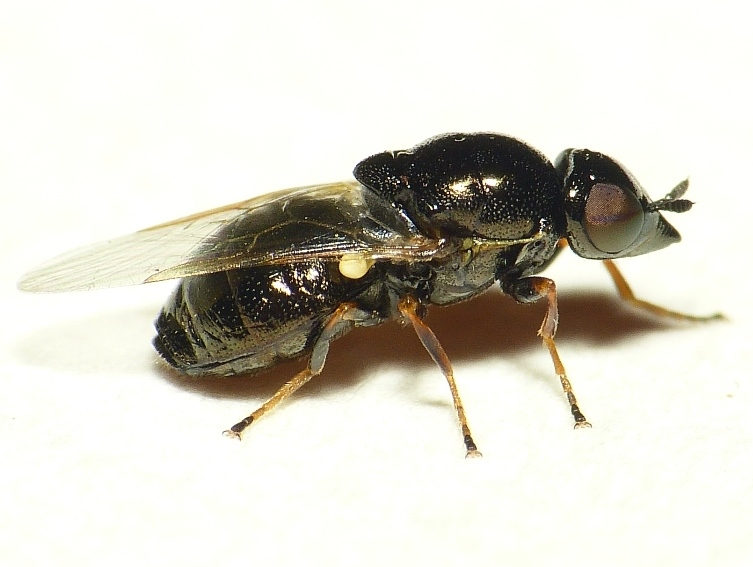
- Nemotelus nigrinus, the "all-black snout"

Scientific classification
- Kingdom: Animalia
- Phylum: Arthropoda
- Class: Insecta
- Order: Diptera
- Family: Stratiomyidae
- Genus: Nemotelus
- Subgenus: Camptopelta
- Species: N. nigrinus

Binomial name
- Nemotelus nigrinus Fallén, 1817

Synonyms
- Nemotelus carneus Walker, 1849; Nemotelus crassus Loew, 1863; Nemotelus unicolor Loew, 1863; Nemotelus carbonarius Loew, 1869; Nemotelus cabonarius Loew, 1872

= Nemotelus nigrinus =

Species of fly

Nemotelus nigrinus, the all-black snout, is a Holarctic species of soldier fly.

== Description ==
A small species (4.0 to 4.8.mm). Its cubital vein (R 4+5) is unforked. Its body is all black, without any pale patterning. Its frons are without any white spots. The distance from the base of the antennae to the tip of the rostellum is greater than the distance from the antennal base to the commencement of the narrow part of the frons. Median outgrowths of hypandrium and outgrowth of basal segment of gonopodites are absent. Its aedeagus has two basal projections which are at a right angle to the plane of the aedeagus.

== Biology ==
The flight period is May to July. Its habitats are fens and marshes, flower meadows, and flower rich grassland.

== Distribution ==
North and Central Europe, North and South USSR, Caucasus, Siberia, Central Asia, Mongolia, North America.
