= Nemotelus wilfordhansoni =

Scientific classification
- Kingdom: Animalia
- Phylum: Arthropoda
- Class: Insecta
- Order: Diptera
- Family: Stratiomyidae
- Genus: Nemotelus
- Subgenus: Camptopelta
- Species: N. wilfordhansoni

Binomial name
- Nemotelus wilfordhansoni Woodley, 2001

Synonyms
- Nemotelus albipes Hanson, 1963

Species of fly

Nemotelus wilfordhansoni is a species of soldier fly in the family Stratiomyidae.

== Distribution ==
United States.
