= Nemotelus aldrichi =

Scientific classification
- Kingdom: Animalia
- Phylum: Arthropoda
- Class: Insecta
- Order: Diptera
- Family: Stratiomyidae
- Genus: Nemotelus
- Subgenus: Camptopelta
- Species: N. aldrichi

Binomial name
- Nemotelus aldrichi (Williston, 1917)

Synonyms
- Camptopelta aldrichi Williston, 1917; Nemotelus lambda James, 1933

Species of fly

Nemotelus aldrichi is a species of soldier fly in the family Stratiomyidae.

== Distribution ==
United States.
