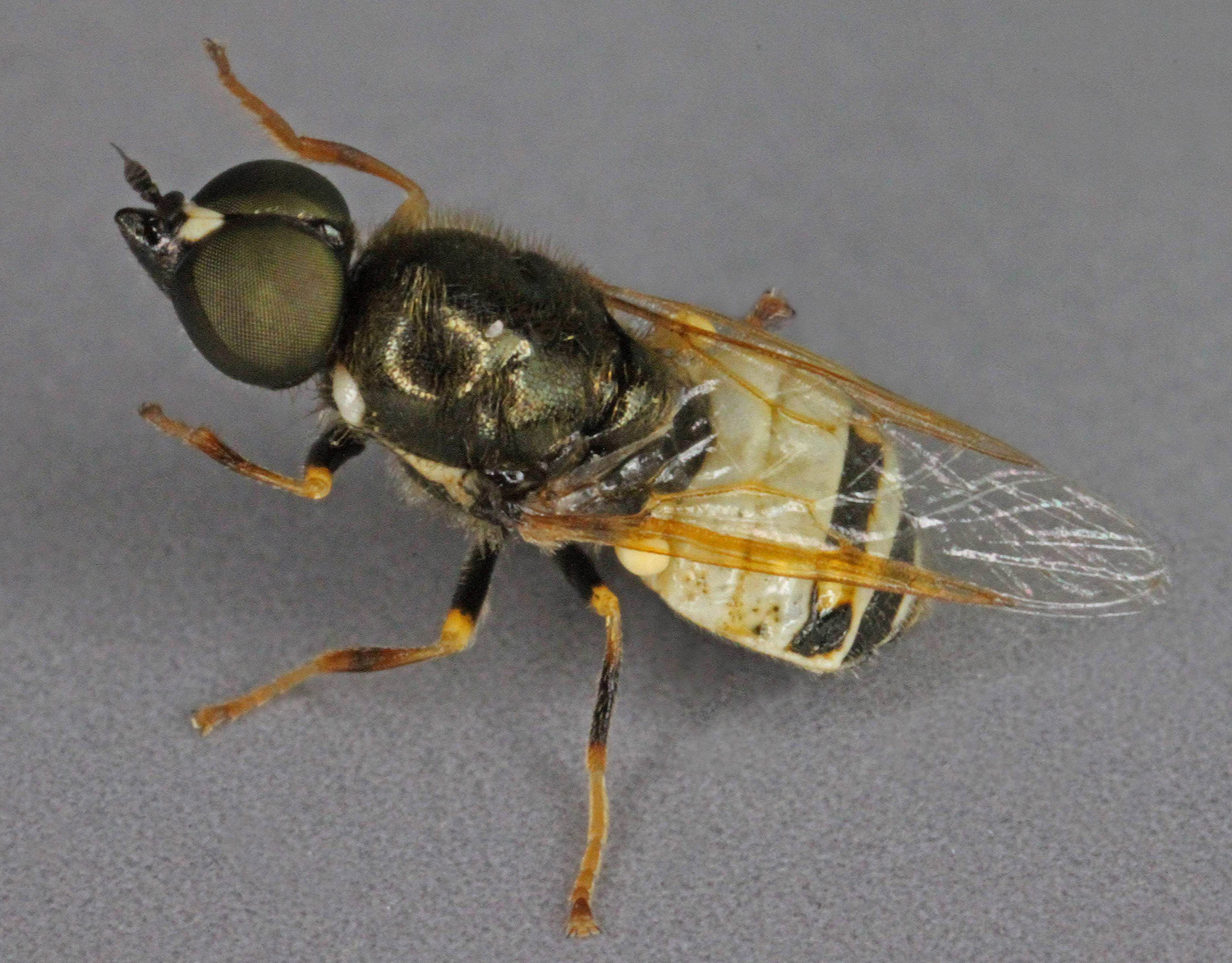
- Nemotelus uliginosus North Wales

Scientific classification
- Kingdom: Animalia
- Phylum: Arthropoda
- Class: Insecta
- Order: Diptera
- Family: Stratiomyidae
- Genus: Nemotelus
- Subgenus: Camptopelta
- Species: N. uliginosus

Binomial name
- Nemotelus uliginosus (Linnaeus, 1767)

Synonyms
- Musca uliginosus Linnaeus, 1767

= Nemotelus uliginosus =

Species of fly

Nemotelus uliginosus, the barred snout, is a Palearctic species of soldier fly.

== Description ==
Length 5—5,5 mm. Male: the abdomen is white with black spots. The cubital vein is forked. The venter is black with white incisures and a white spot. Female: the snout (rostellum) is long, the white spots above the antennae are linear and oblique, nearly meeting in the middle.

== Biology ==
The habitat is saltmarsh, waste ground and unimproved grassland, usually coastal. Adults are found from June to early September, peaking in July. Adults feed on pollen and nectar including that of Alisma plantago-aquatica, Cirsium, umbelliferae

== Distribution ==
North, South USSR Siberia, Kazakhstan. North and Central Europe, in north to middle Sweden and in South to northern France. North Africa
