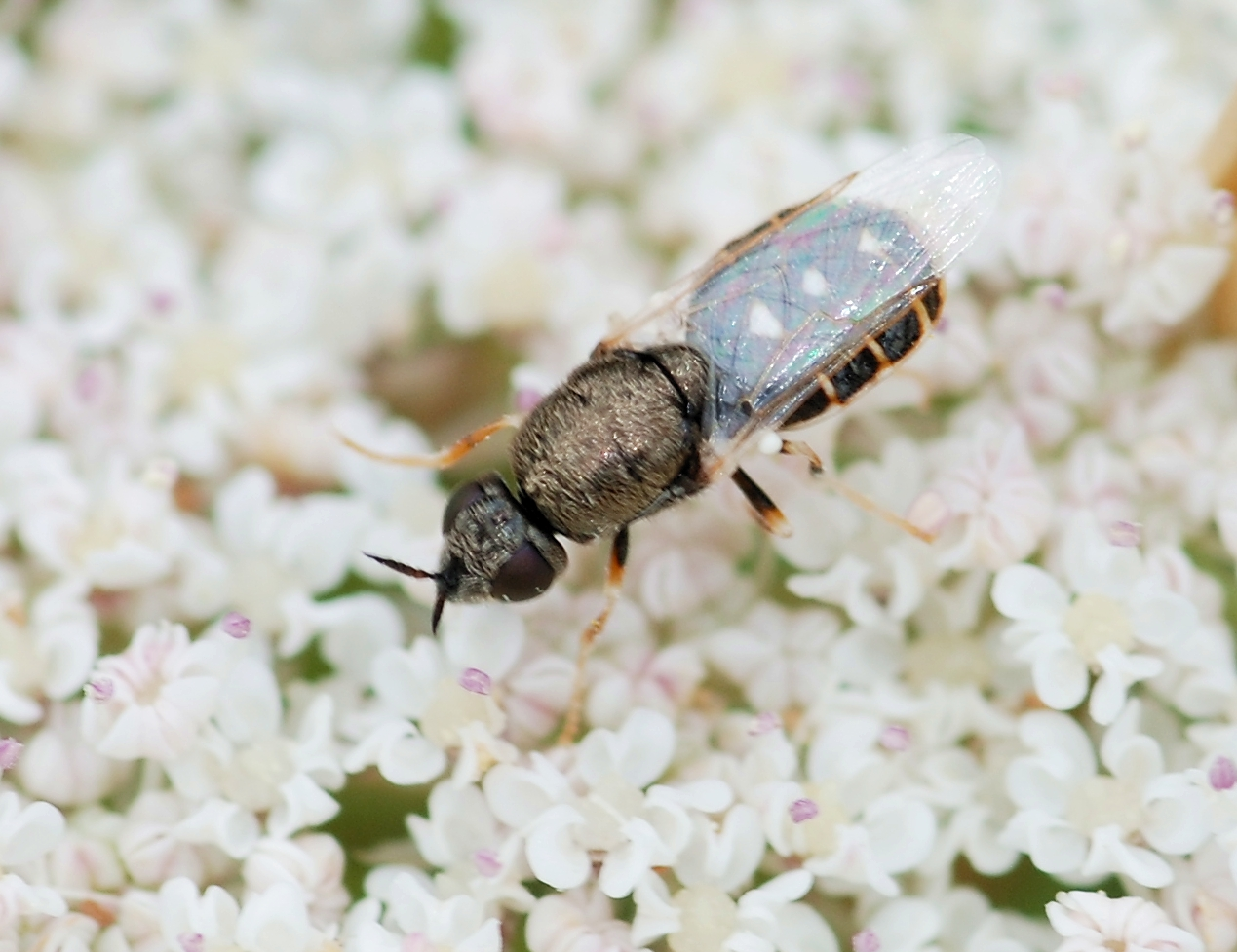
- Nemotelus pantherinus female
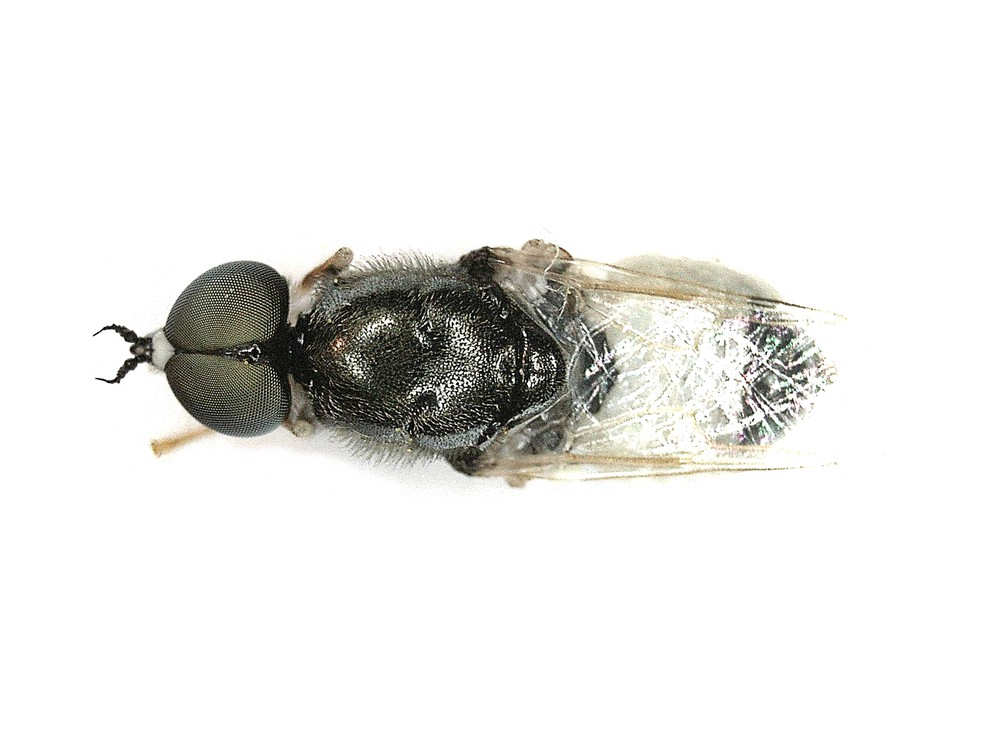
- Nemotelus pantherinus male

Scientific classification
- Kingdom: Animalia
- Phylum: Arthropoda
- Clade: Pancrustacea
- Class: Insecta
- Order: Diptera
- Family: Stratiomyidae
- Genus: Nemotelus
- Subgenus: Camptopelta
- Species: N. pantherinus

Binomial name
- Nemotelus pantherinus (Linnaeus, 1758)

Synonyms
- Musca pantherinus Linnaeus, 1758; Nemotelus fraternus Loew, 1846; Nemotelus marginatus (Fabricius, 1775); Stratiomys marginata Fabricius, 1775

= Nemotelus pantherinus =

Species of fly

Nemotelus pantherinus, the fen snout, is a European species of soldier fly.

== Description ==
Black. – Male has a white frons; the abdomen is white at the base and black at the tip. Female: The abdomen is edged with white with a row of white dorsal spots. The legs are black; the ends of the femurs, tibias, and tarsi yellowish and the middle of the third tibias brown. Wings glassy with white veins. Halters yellow or whitish. - L. 3.5-5 mm.

== Biology ==
It is found in wetlands and dune slacks.
