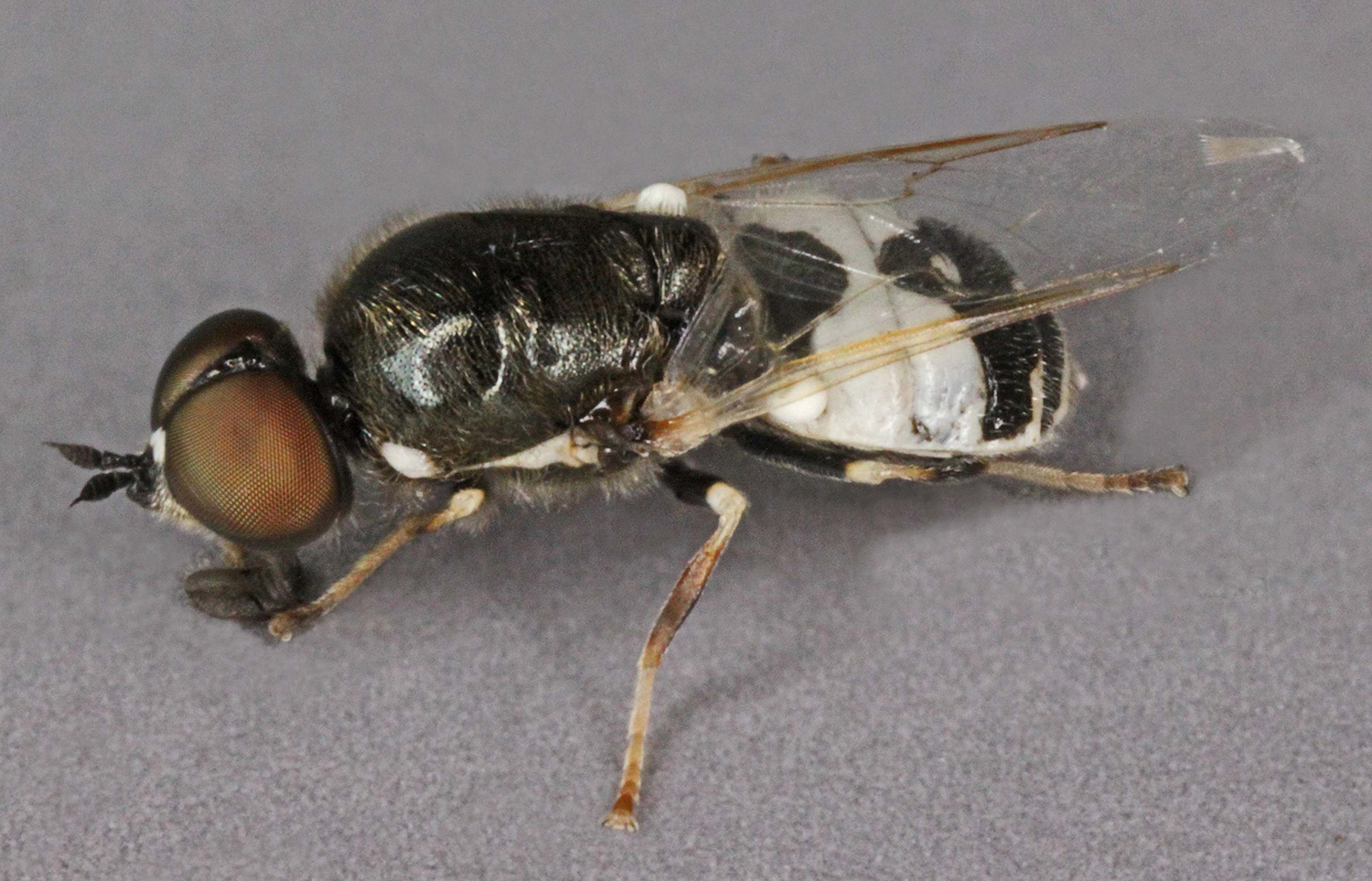

Scientific classification
- Kingdom: Animalia
- Phylum: Arthropoda
- Class: Insecta
- Order: Diptera
- Family: Stratiomyidae
- Genus: Nemotelus
- Subgenus: Nemotelus
- Species: N. notatus

Binomial name
- Nemotelus notatus Zetterstedt, 1842

Synonyms
- Nemotelus brachystomus Loew, 1846; Nemotelus leucorhynchus Costa, 1884; Nemotelus nigroaeneus Verhoeff, 1891; Nemotelus punctiventris Becker, 1902; Nemotelus balearicus Lindner, 1937; Nemotelus zernyi Lindner, 1937

= Nemotelus notatus =

Species of fly

Nemotelus notatus, the flecked snout, is a European species of soldier fly.

== Description ==
Length 5–6,5 mm. Male: the snout (rostellum) is short;the abdomen is white with black basal and apical spots and with a spot on the third segment (Seguy "sternites I-IV tachés de noir"), the venter is white with a black marginal spot. Female: the snout (rostellum) is short; the white spots above the antennae are triangular, not oblique and widely separated in the middle.

== Biology ==
The flight period is June to August. Habitats are salt marshes and other salt grounds. Larvae in saline water bodies. Adults are flower feeders on Crepis Cirsium, Senecio, Tripolium pannonicum and umbellifers and....

== Distribution ==
Northern and Central Europe, from southern Sweden to southern Germany and Austria. Siberia. Finland.
