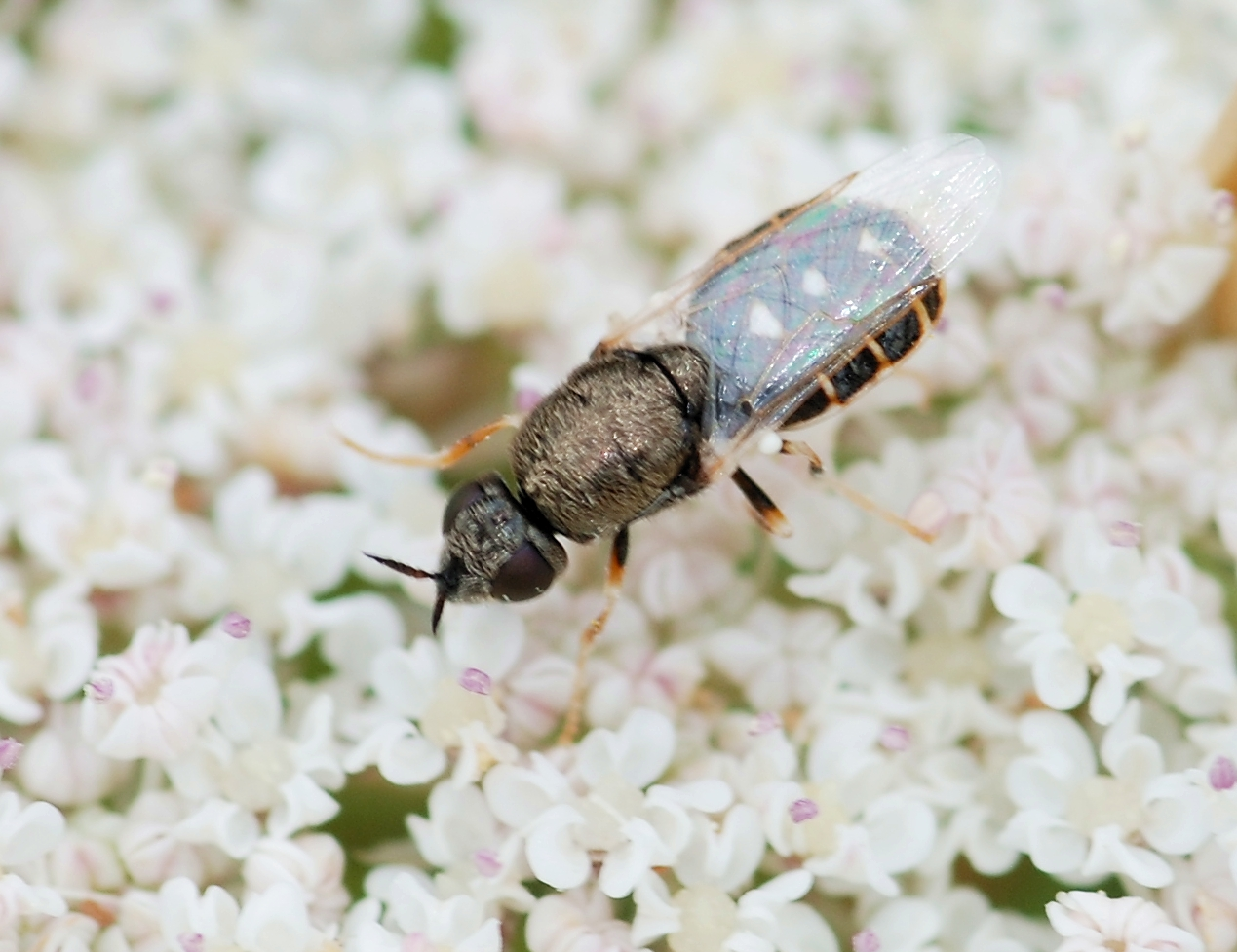
- Nemotelus pantherinus

Scientific classification
- Kingdom: Animalia
- Phylum: Arthropoda
- Clade: Pancrustacea
- Class: Insecta
- Order: Diptera
- Family: Stratiomyidae
- Subfamily: Nemotelinae
- Genus: Nemotelus
- Subgenus: Nemotelus; Geoffroy, 1762

Type species
- Musca pantherinus Linnaeus, 1758

= Nemotelus (subgenus) =

Subgenus of flies

Nemotelus is a subgenus of flies in the family Stratiomyidae.

== Species ==
- N. albitarsis Lindner, 1965
- N. annulipes Lindner, 1965
- N. assimilis Lindner, 1965
- N. barracloughi (Mason, 1997)
- N. basilaris (Woodley, 2001)
- N. mongolia (Woodley, 2001)
- N. natalensis Lindner, 1965
- N. nigribasis Lindner, 1965
- N. notatus Zetterstedt, 1842
- N. pantherinus (Linnaeus, 1758)
- N. stuckenbergi Lindner, 1965
- N. tricolor Lindner, 1965
- N. tschorsnigi (Mason, 1997)
- N. uliginosus (Linnaeus, 1767)
