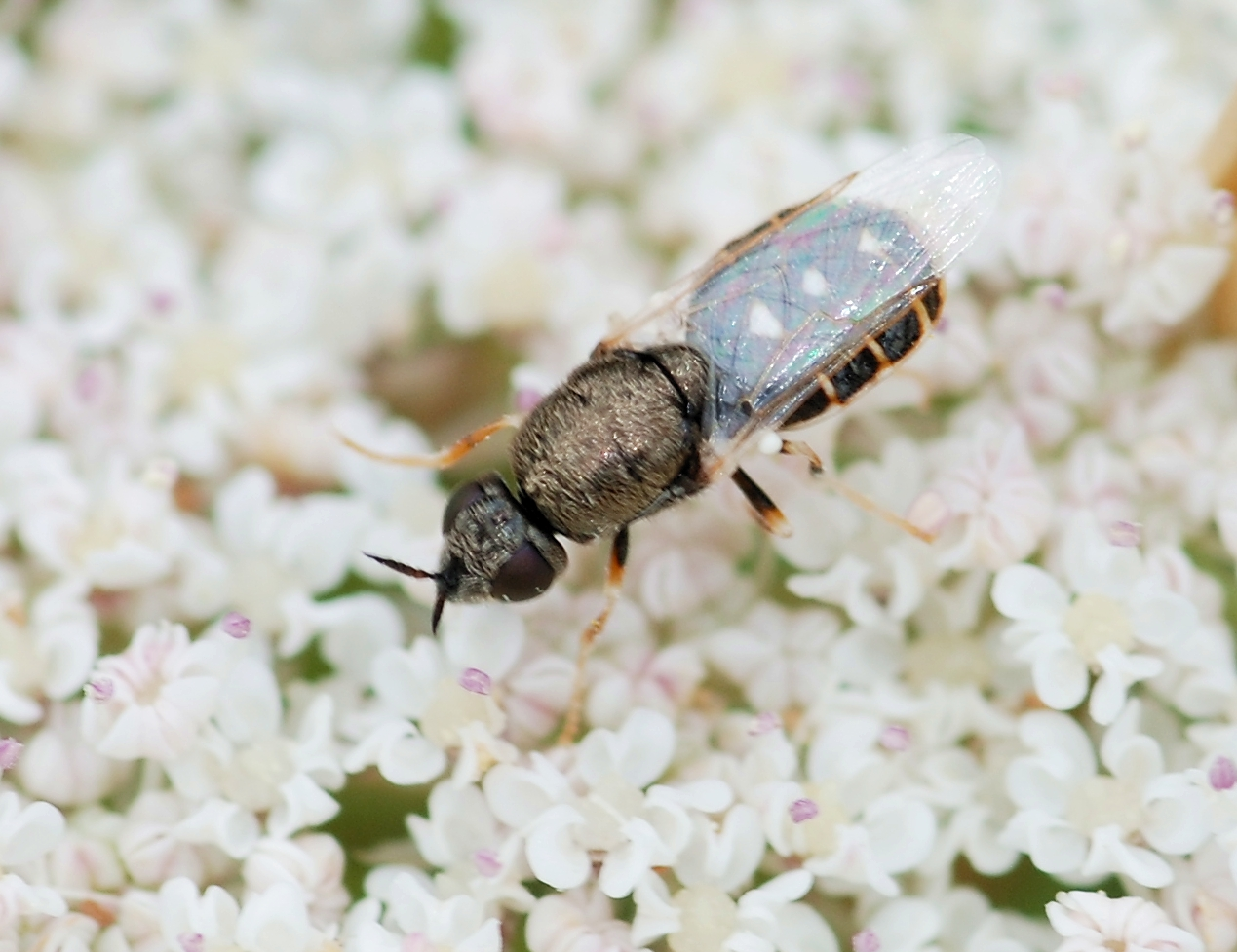
- Nemotelus pantherinus

Scientific classification
- Kingdom: Animalia
- Phylum: Arthropoda
- Clade: Pancrustacea
- Class: Insecta
- Order: Diptera
- Family: Stratiomyidae
- Subfamily: Nemotelinae

= Nemotelinae =

Subfamily of flies

Nemotelinae is a subfamily of flies in the family Stratiomyidae.

== Genera ==
- Brachycara Thomson, 1869
- Lasiopa Brullé, 1833
- Nemotelus Geoffroy, 1762
- Pselaphomyia Kertész, 1923
