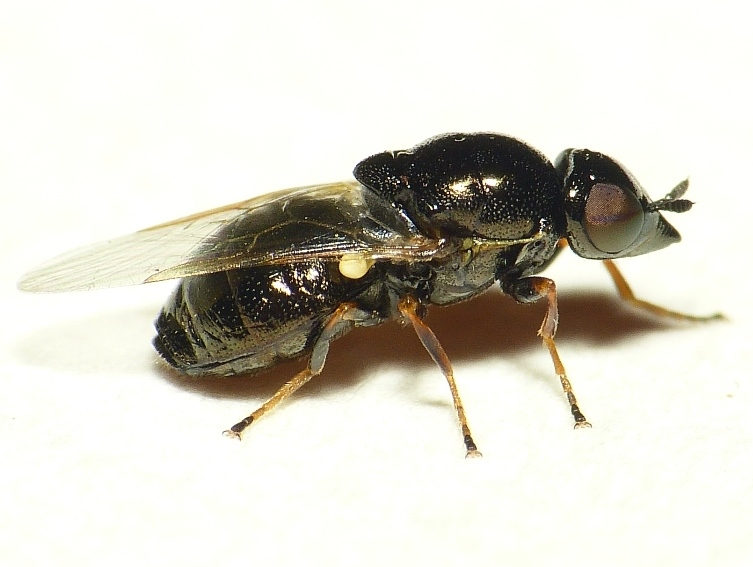
- Nemotelus nigrinus, the "all-black snout"

Scientific classification
- Kingdom: Animalia
- Phylum: Arthropoda
- Clade: Pancrustacea
- Class: Insecta
- Order: Diptera
- Family: Stratiomyidae
- Genus: Nemotelus
- Subgenus: Camptopelta; Williston, 1917

Type species
- Camptopelta aldrichi Williston, 1917

= Camptopelta =

Subgenus of flies

Camptopelta is a subgenus of flies in the family Stratiomyidae.

== Species ==
- N. aldrichi (Williston, 1917)
- N. nigrinus Fallén, 1817
- N. wilfordhansoni (Woodley, 2001)
