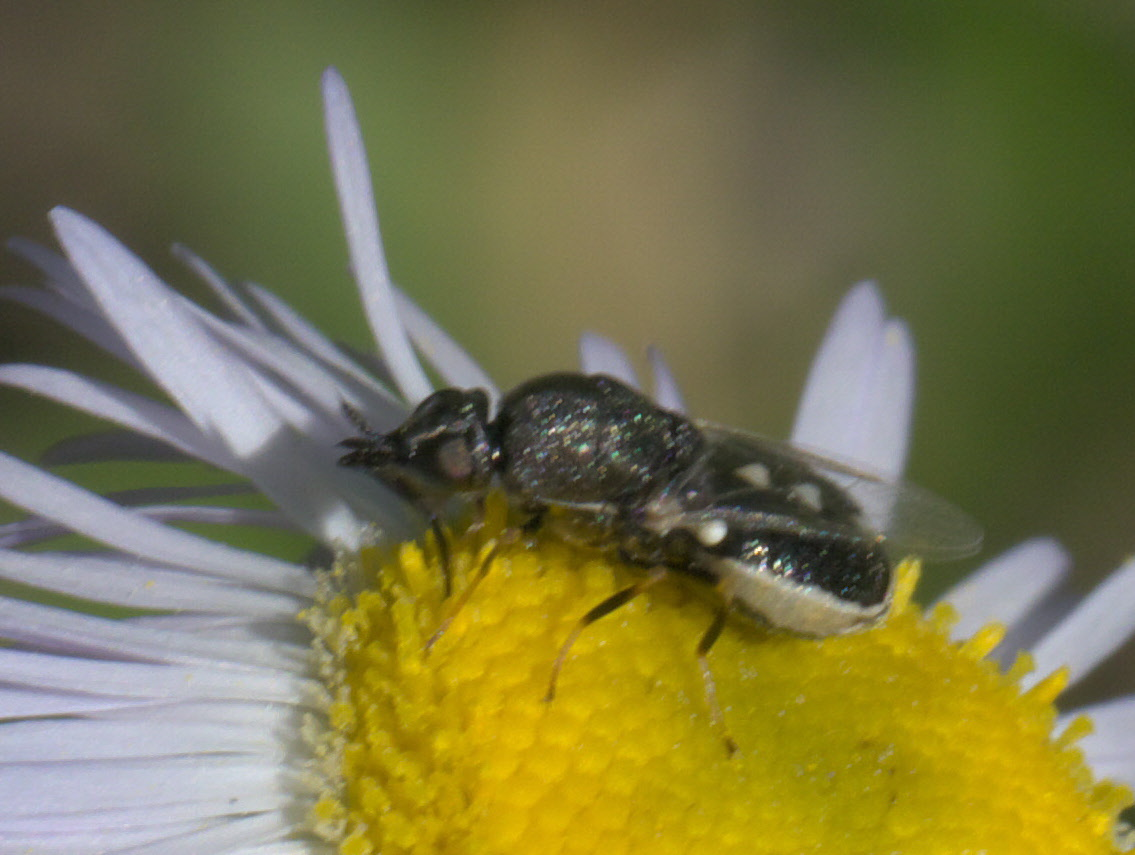
- Nemotelus kansensis

Scientific classification
- Kingdom: Animalia
- Phylum: Arthropoda
- Class: Insecta
- Order: Diptera
- Family: Stratiomyidae
- Subfamily: Nemotelinae
- Genus: Nemotelus; Geoffroy, 1762

Type species
- Musca pantherinus Linnaeus, 1758

Diversity
- at least 190 species

Synonyms
- Epideicticus Kertész, 1923

= Nemotelus =

Genus of flies

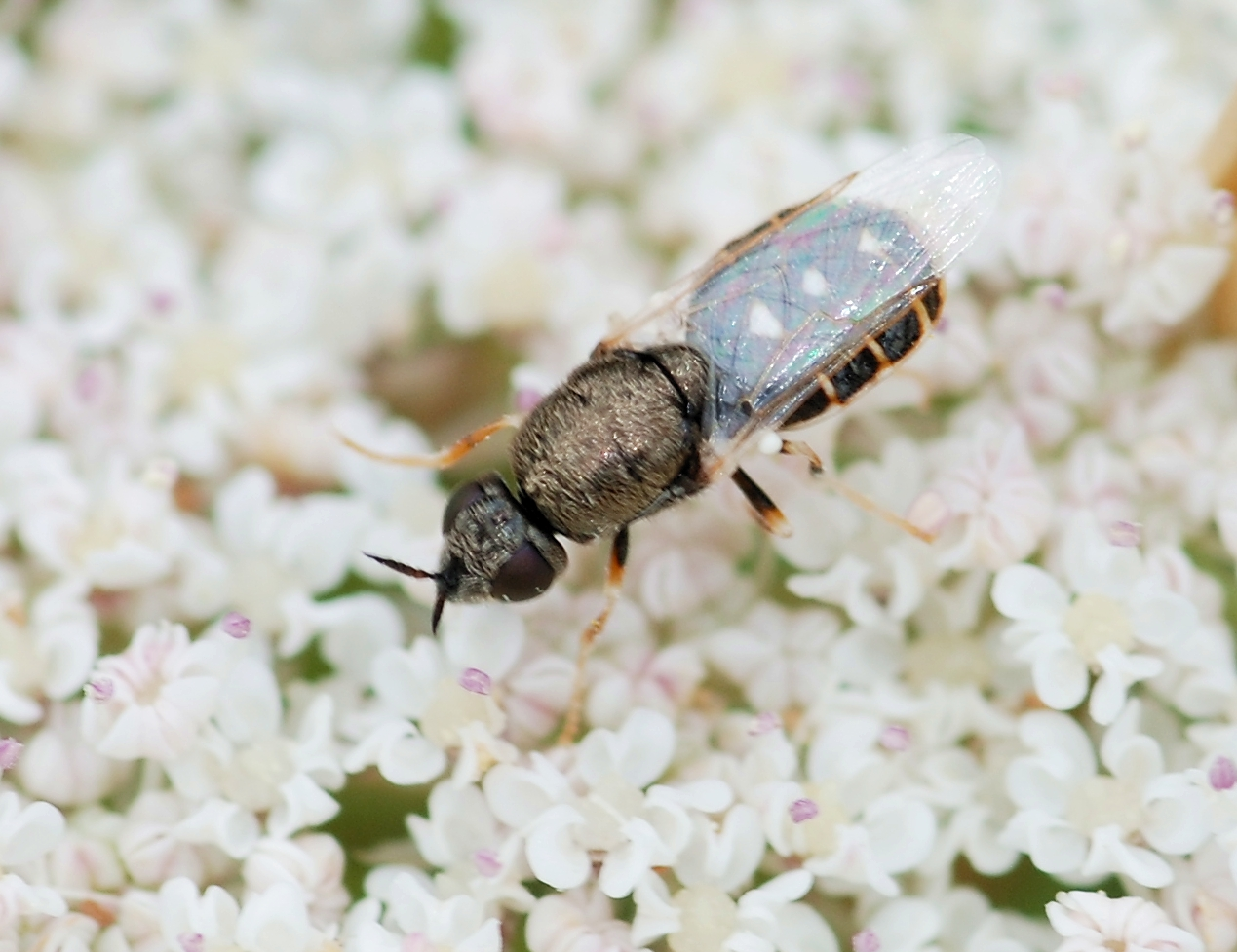
Nemotelus pantherinus

Nemotelus is a genus of soldier flies in the family Stratiomyidae. Nemotelus is known from the Nearctic, Afrotropical and the Palaearctic regions.

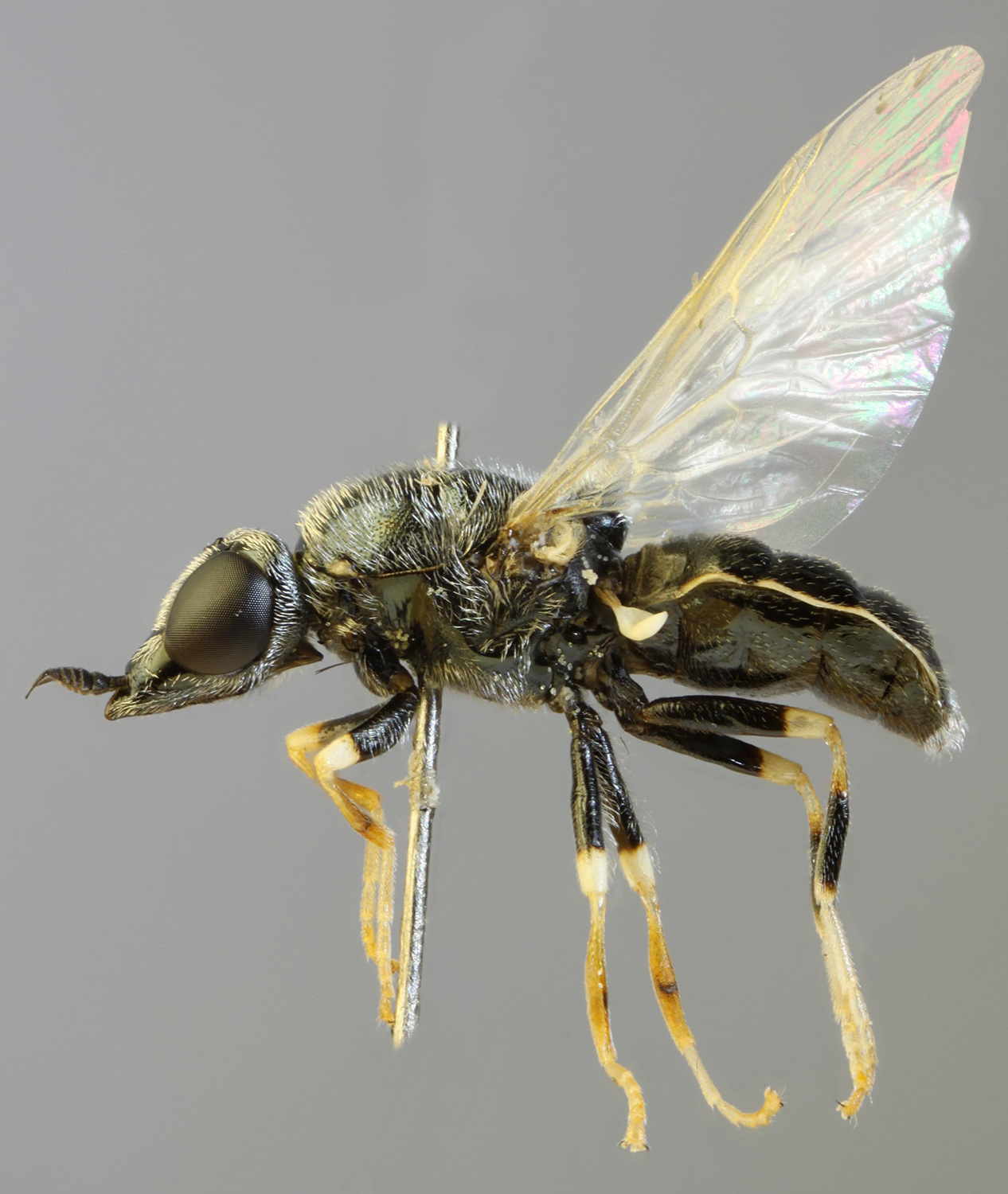
Nemotelus pantherinus lateral view

Nemotelus are among the smallest (4.0 to 8.0 mm) Stratiomyidae. The species are black or (most) black with more or less, often greatly extended white spots; the colouring is different in the two sexes. The head is round but the face has a pointed snout bearing the antennae on the dorsal side. The facial lobe, below the antennae, is conical and prominent and the whole facial area is pushed anteriorly by the expansion of the parafacials, and of the frons immediately above the antennae. The eyes of the male almost meet, and the eyes have smaller facets in the ventral part. The proboscis is geniculate. Body-shape and wing-venation are generally similar to that of Oxycera except that R4+5 is usually forked, and R 2+a is faint. The basal segment of gonopods in male on the lower side is fused with the hypandrium which has two more or less elongated median outgrowths;basal segment with lateral outgrowth at apex on outer side. Nemotelus species are not lively, and are easily caught with the fingers. They occur in the neighbourhood of water, in fens and similar localities, where they often are seen on the flowers of Umbelliferae and Compositae, sometimes in large numbers. Some of them seem to prefer salt marshes.

== Selected species ==
- Subgenus Camptopelta

- N. aldrichi (Williston, 1917)
- N. nigrinus Fallén, 1817
- N. wilfordhansoni (Woodley, 2001)

- Subgenus Nemotelus

- N. abdominalis Adams, 1903
- N. anchora Loew, 1846
- N. annulipes Lindner, 1965
- N. argentifer Loew, 1846
- N. albitarsis Lindner, 1965
- N. assimilis Lindner, 1965
- N. barracloughi (Mason, 1997)
- N. basilaris (Woodley, 2001)
- N. bellulus Melander, 1903
- N. bipunctatus Loew, 1846
- N. brevirostris Meigen, 1822
- N. lasiops Loew, 1846
- N. mongolia (Woodley, 2001)
- N. natalensis Lindner, 1965
- N. nigribasis Lindner, 1965
- N. nigrifrons Loew, 1846
- N. notatus Zetterstedt, 1842
- N. pantherinus (Linnaeus, 1758)
- N. proboscideus Loew, 1846
- N. stuckenbergi Lindner, 1965
- N. tricolor Lindner, 1965
- N. tschorsnigi (Mason, 1997)
- N. uliginosus (Linnaeus, 1767)

== See also ==
- List of Nemotelus species
