= Haematopota subcylindrica =

Scientific classification
- Kingdom: Animalia
- Phylum: Arthropoda
- Class: Insecta
- Order: Diptera
- Family: Tabanidae
- Subfamily: Tabaninae
- Tribe: Haematopotini
- Genus: Haematopota
- Species: H. subcylindrica

Binomial name
- Haematopota subcylindrica Pandellé, 1883

Species of fly

Haematopota subcylindrica is a species of horse-flies that can be found in such European countries as Austria, Belgium, Great Britain including the Isle of Man, Bulgaria, Czech Republic, Denmark, France, Germany, Hungary, Italy, Liechtenstein, Lithuania, Poland, Romania, Russia, Slovakia, Sweden, the Netherlands, and in all states of former Yugoslavia (except for North Macedonia). It can also be found in Near East including Middle East.
