= Haematopota rara =

Scientific classification
- Kingdom: Animalia
- Phylum: Arthropoda
- Class: Insecta
- Order: Diptera
- Family: Tabanidae
- Subfamily: Tabaninae
- Tribe: Haematopotini
- Genus: Haematopota
- Species: H. rara

Binomial name
- Haematopota rara Johnson, 1912

Species of fly

Haematopota rara, the lace-winged horsefly or shy cleg, is a species of horse flies (insects in the family Tabanidae).

== Distribution ==
H. rara has been recorded in the eastern United States west to Ohio and Tennessee, south to northern Virginia and in New Brunswick and Nova Scotia in Canada.
