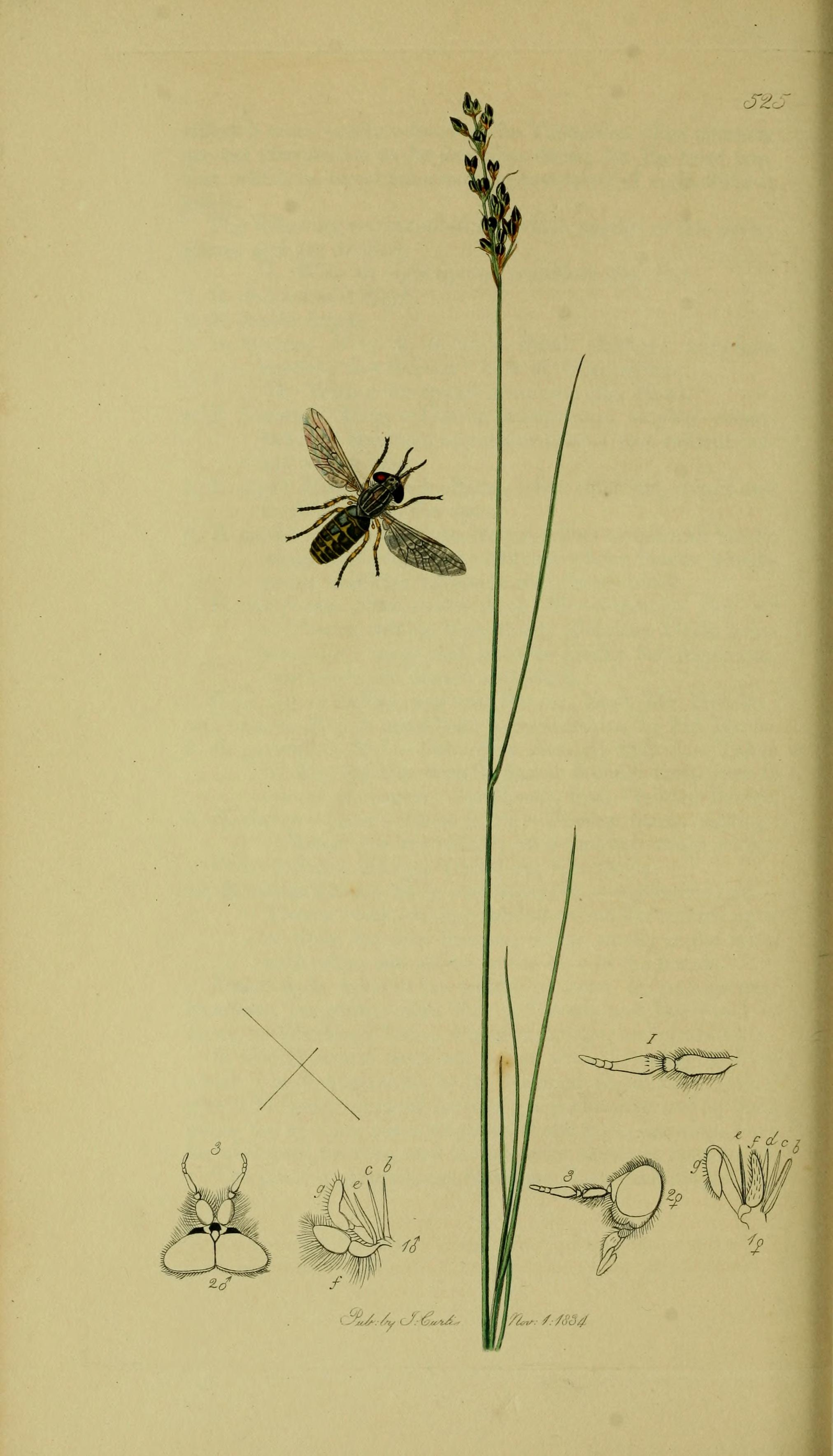
- H.grandis in British Entomology

Scientific classification
- Kingdom: Animalia
- Phylum: Arthropoda
- Clade: Pancrustacea
- Class: Insecta
- Order: Diptera
- Family: Tabanidae
- Subfamily: Tabaninae
- Tribe: Haematopotini
- Genus: Haematopota
- Species: H. grandis

Binomial name
- Haematopota grandis Meigen, 1820

Synonyms
- Tabanus sangisuga Harris, 1776; Haematopota fraseri Austen, 1925

= Haematopota grandis =

Species of fly

Haematopota grandis is a species of horse-fly. Its common name is the long-horned cleg. It is native to Europe, where it is distributed in Albania, Austria, Bulgaria, Czech Republic, Denmark, France, Germany, Greece, Hungary, Italy, Moldova, Romania, Slovakia, Spain, Sweden, Switzerland, Ukraine, and all states of former Yugoslavia (except North Macedonia).

== Description and habitat ==
The species is 9–13 millimetres (0.35–0.51 in) long. Its habitat includes salt marshes.
