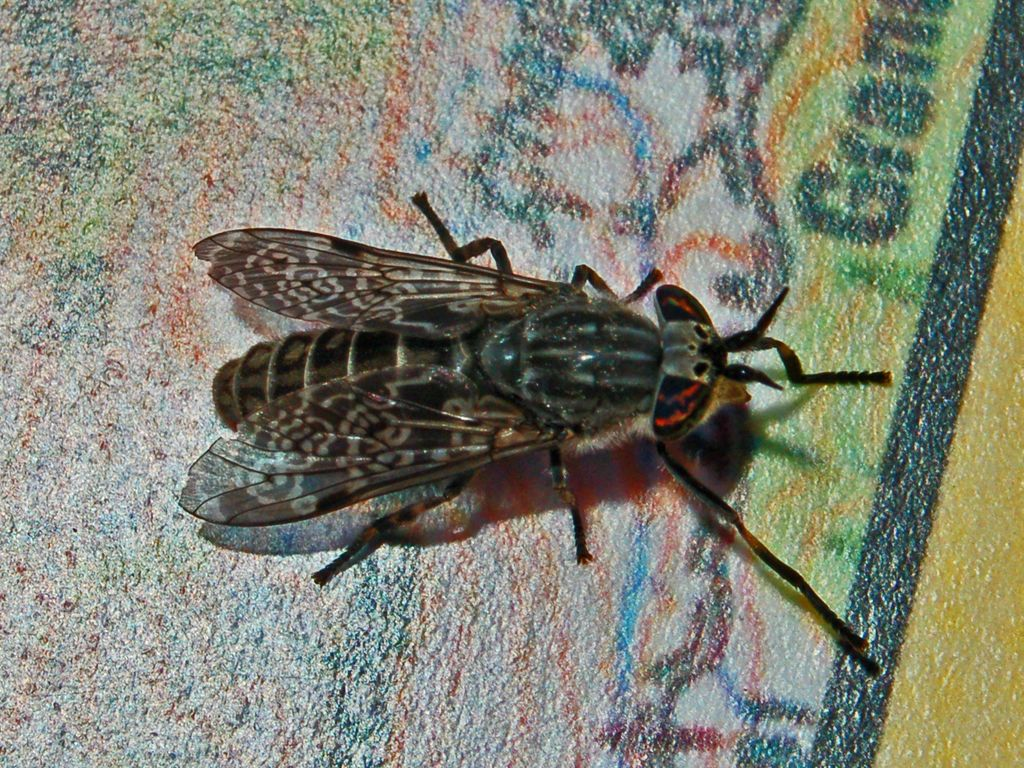

Scientific classification
- Kingdom: Animalia
- Phylum: Arthropoda
- Class: Insecta
- Order: Diptera
- Family: Tabanidae
- Subfamily: Tabaninae
- Tribe: Haematopotini
- Genus: Haematopota
- Species: H. pluvialis

Binomial name
- Haematopota pluvialis (Linnaeus, 1758)

= Common horse fly =

Species of fly

The common horse fly (Haematopota pluvialis), also known as the notch-horned cleg fly, or simply cleg in Scotland and northern parts of Ireland, is a fly species belonging to the family Tabanidae subfamily Tabaninae.

== Distribution and habitat ==
This species is present in most of Europe, in the Near East, and in the eastern Palearctic realm. It mainly lies in heath and moorland, and in spruce forest edge.

== Description ==
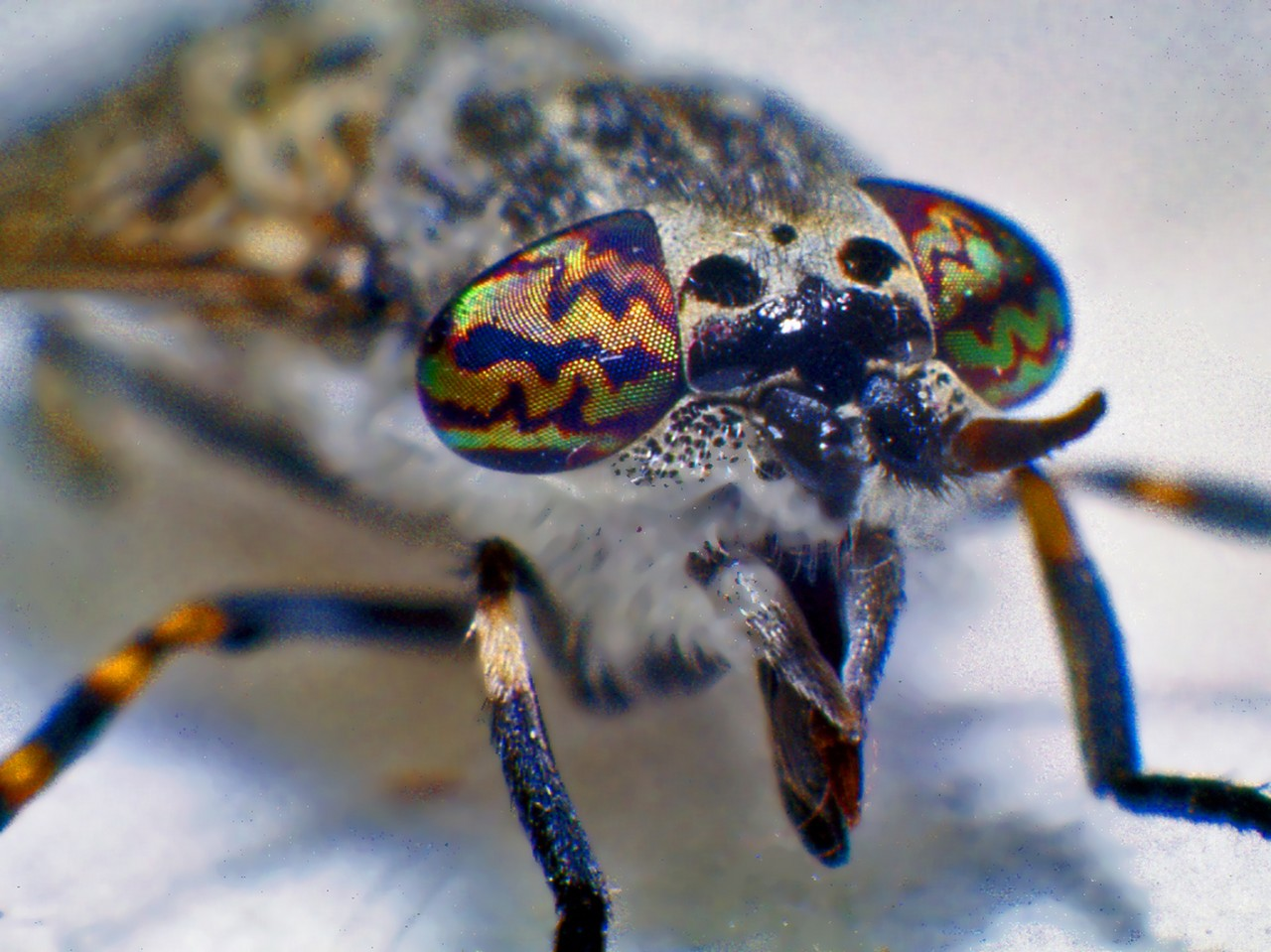
Female of Haematopota pluvialis

Common horse flies can reach a length of 5–11.5 millimetres (0.20–0.45 in), with a wingspan of 8–10 mm. This species has large compound eyes necessary for locating its prey. They are hairy and brightly colored, with stripes extended over most of the eye. In males, the eyes touch at the centre of the frons and the colored stripes are restricted to the lower part.

Female in a wet meadow

The first antennal segment is quite bulbous and has a strong sub-apical notch in the female. The thorax is grey, with black longitudinal stripes. The abdomen shows a dark background with a series of lateral pale spots and clearer bands at the end of each black segment. Also the wings have a distinctive pattern, being dark mottled by several clear spots. The legs are black, with yellowish-brown rings.

This species is similar to the also common Haematopota crassicornis, but differs from that species in the orange third antennal segment, in the presence of the sub-apical notch and in the overall brown colouration compared to the often grey tinge of crassicornis.

== Biology ==
These horse flies can be encountered during the daylight hours from late May through late October. The males are harmless and feed on nectar, while the females feed on mammal blood (hematophagy) (hence the Latin name Haematopota pluvialis, literally meaning 'blooddrinker of the rains'), mainly cattle and horses, needing blood for developing eggs. When they bite they inject fluids inhibiting the coagulation of blood, which flows out in such a way that allows the horsefly to lap it. They are also able to bite humans painfully. Females lay their eggs at the base of grass-stems or on the surface of moist soil.

== Gallery ==
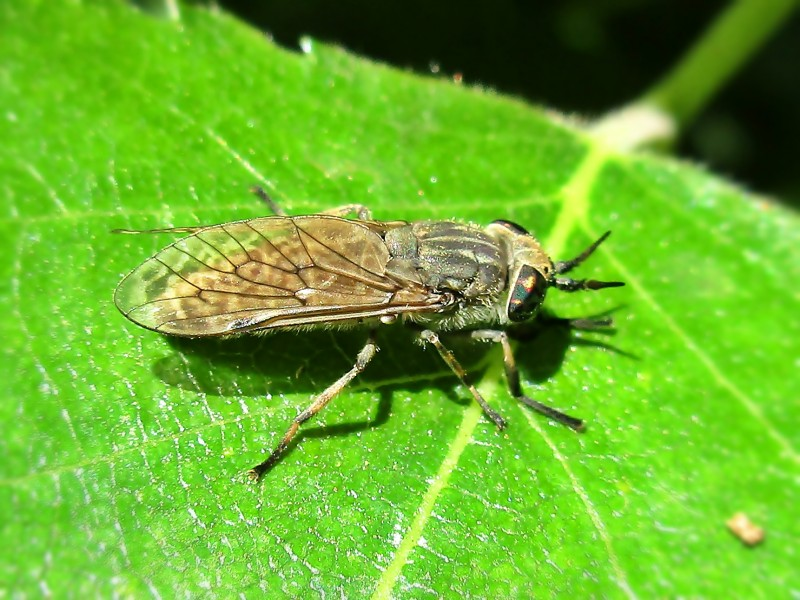
Female

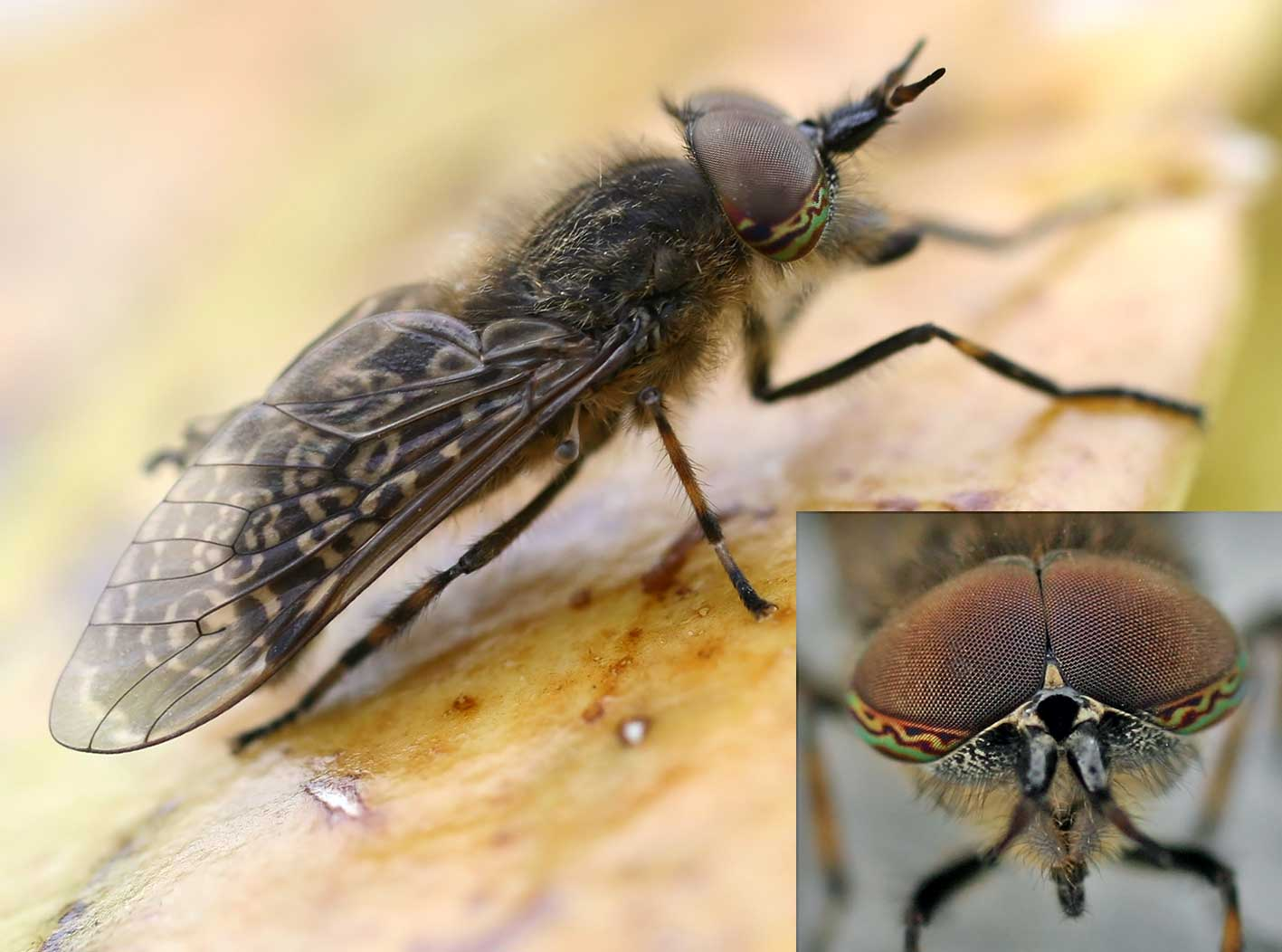
Male, with its characteristic eyes

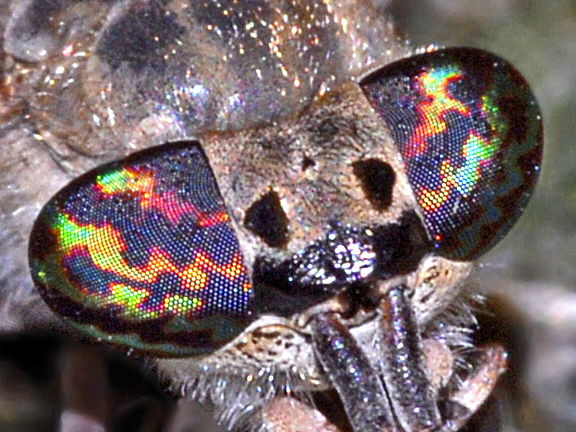
The separated female eyes

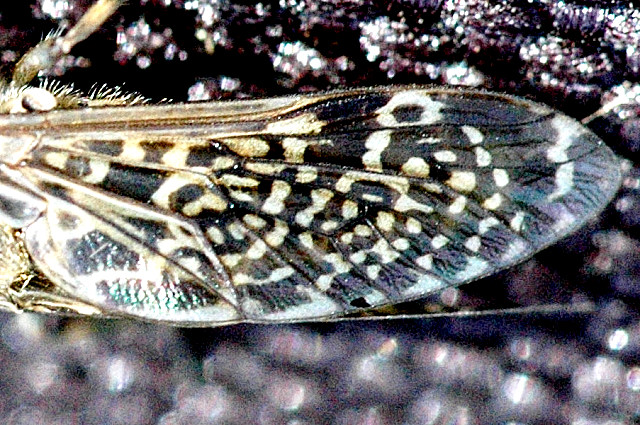
Wing detail

== Bibliography ==
- Brightwell, R. & Dransfield, R.D. (2014). Survey of Tabanidae (horseflies) in southern England 2014. A preliminary survey of tabanids using odour-baited NG2F traps. 14 pp.
- Burgess, N.R.H. et al. (1978). The immature stages of the common cleg Haematopota pluvialis L. (Diptera: Tabanidae). J. roy. Army med. Cps. 124, 27-30.
- Cameron, A.E. (1930). Oviposition of Haematopota pluvialis Linne. Nature 126, 601-602.
- Grayson, A. (2001). Notes on the behaviour of males of Haematopota crassicornis Wahlberg and Haematopota pluvialis (Linnaeus). Larger Brachycera Recording Scheme Newsletter 19.
- Kniepert, F.W. (1980). Blood-feeding and nectar-feeding in adult Tabanidae (Diptera). Oecologia 46, 125-129.
- Krčmar, S. (2004). Ecological notes on Tabanus bromius L., and Haematopota pluvialis (L.), (Diptera: Tabanidae) of some flood areas in Croatian sections of the river Danube. Journal of Vector Ecology 29(2), 376-378.
- Krčmar, S. et al. (2006). Response of Tabanidae (Diptera) to different natural attractants. Journal of Vector Ecology 31(2), 262-265. Full text
- Liebisch, A.(1987). Vector Biology of Flies on Grazing Cattle in Germany. Veterinary Medicine and Animal Science 45, 109-115.
- Titchener, R.N. et al. (1981). Flies associated with cattle in south west Scotland during the summer months. Researches in Veterinary Science 30 (1), 109-113.
- Ross, H.C.G. 1978 - A note on the hovering behaviour of Haematopota pluvialis (Linne, 1758) (Diptera:Tabanidae) Entomologist’s Gazttte 28:267-268
- Stone, A.L. and Philip, B., 1974 - The Oriental Species of the Tribe Haematopotini (Diptera, Tabanidae), United States Department of Agriculture, Agriculture Research Service - Technical Bulletin, 1489 - Washington D.C.
