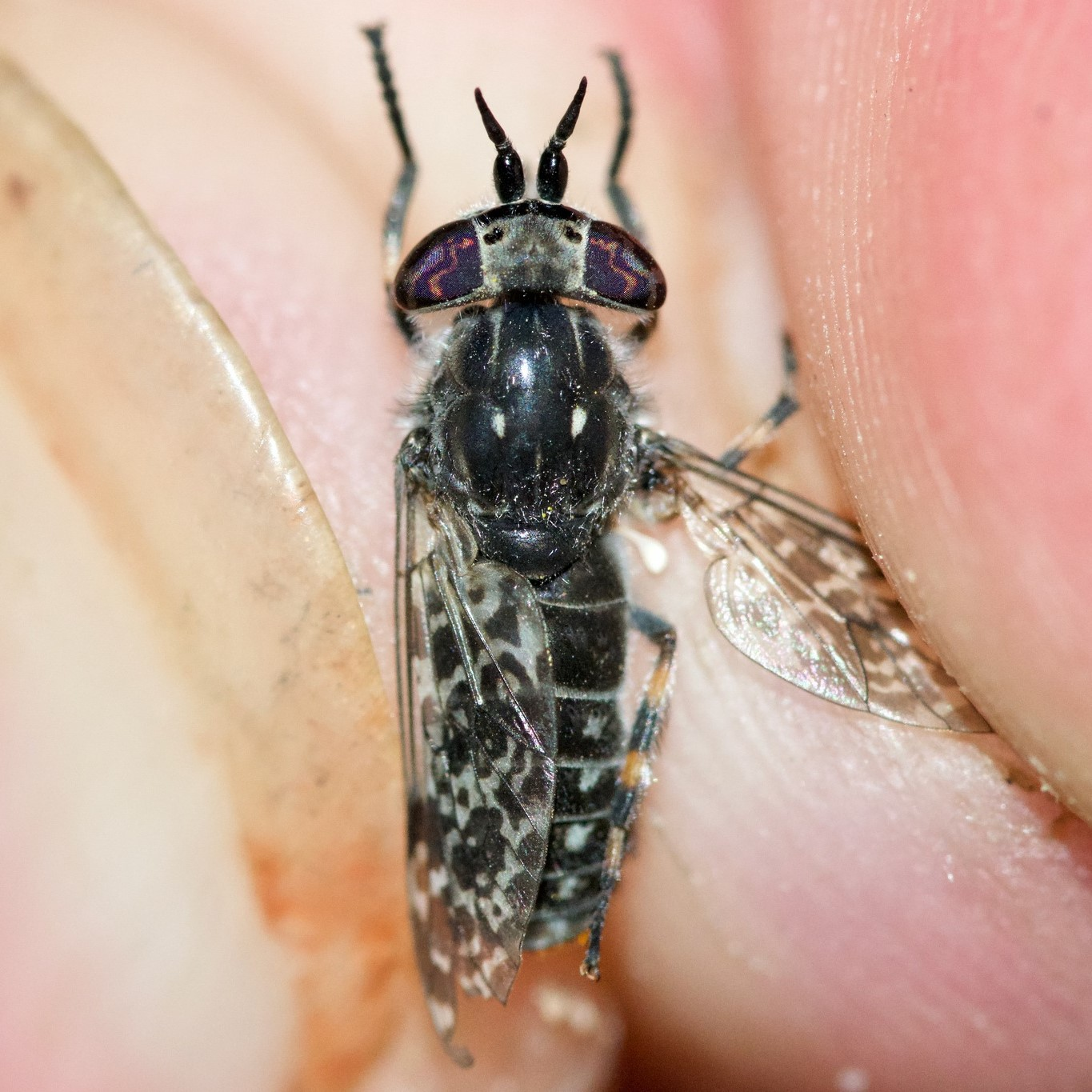

Scientific classification
- Kingdom: Animalia
- Phylum: Arthropoda
- Clade: Pancrustacea
- Class: Insecta
- Order: Diptera
- Family: Tabanidae
- Subfamily: Tabaninae
- Tribe: Haematopotini
- Genus: Haematopota
- Species: H. americana

Binomial name
- Haematopota americana Osten Sacken, 1875

= Haematopota americana =

Species of fly

Haematopota americana is a species of horse fly in the family Tabanidae.

== Distribution ==
It is found in the United States.
