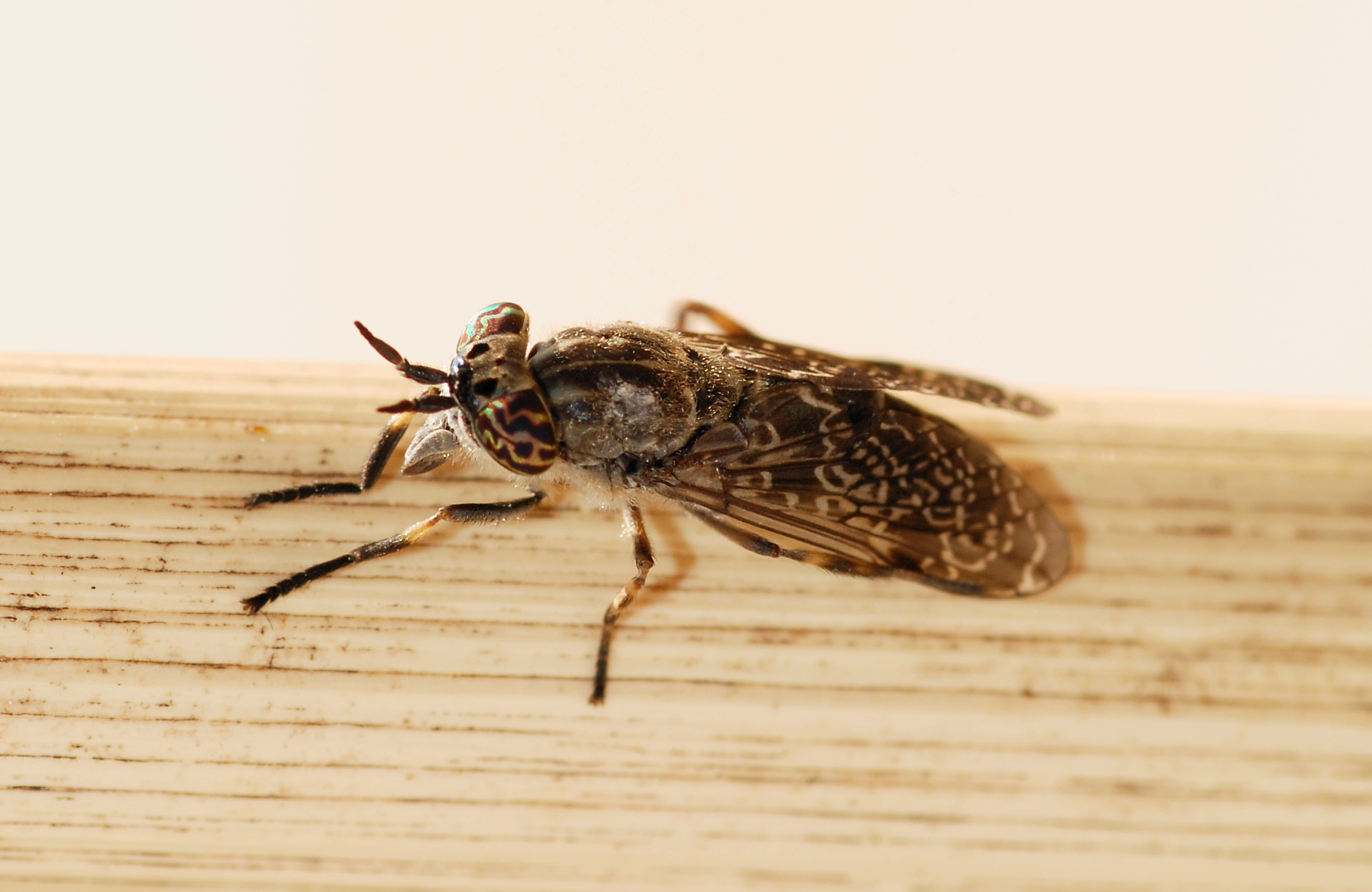
- Haematopota pseudolusitanica

Scientific classification
- Kingdom: Animalia
- Phylum: Arthropoda
- Clade: Pancrustacea
- Class: Insecta
- Order: Diptera
- Family: Tabanidae
- Subfamily: Tabaninae
- Tribe: Haematopotini
- Genus: Haematopota
- Species: H. pseudolusitanica

Binomial name
- Haematopota pseudolusitanica Szilády, 1923

= Haematopota pseudolusitanica =

Species of fly

Haematopota pseudolusitanica is a species of horse fly in the family Tabanidae.

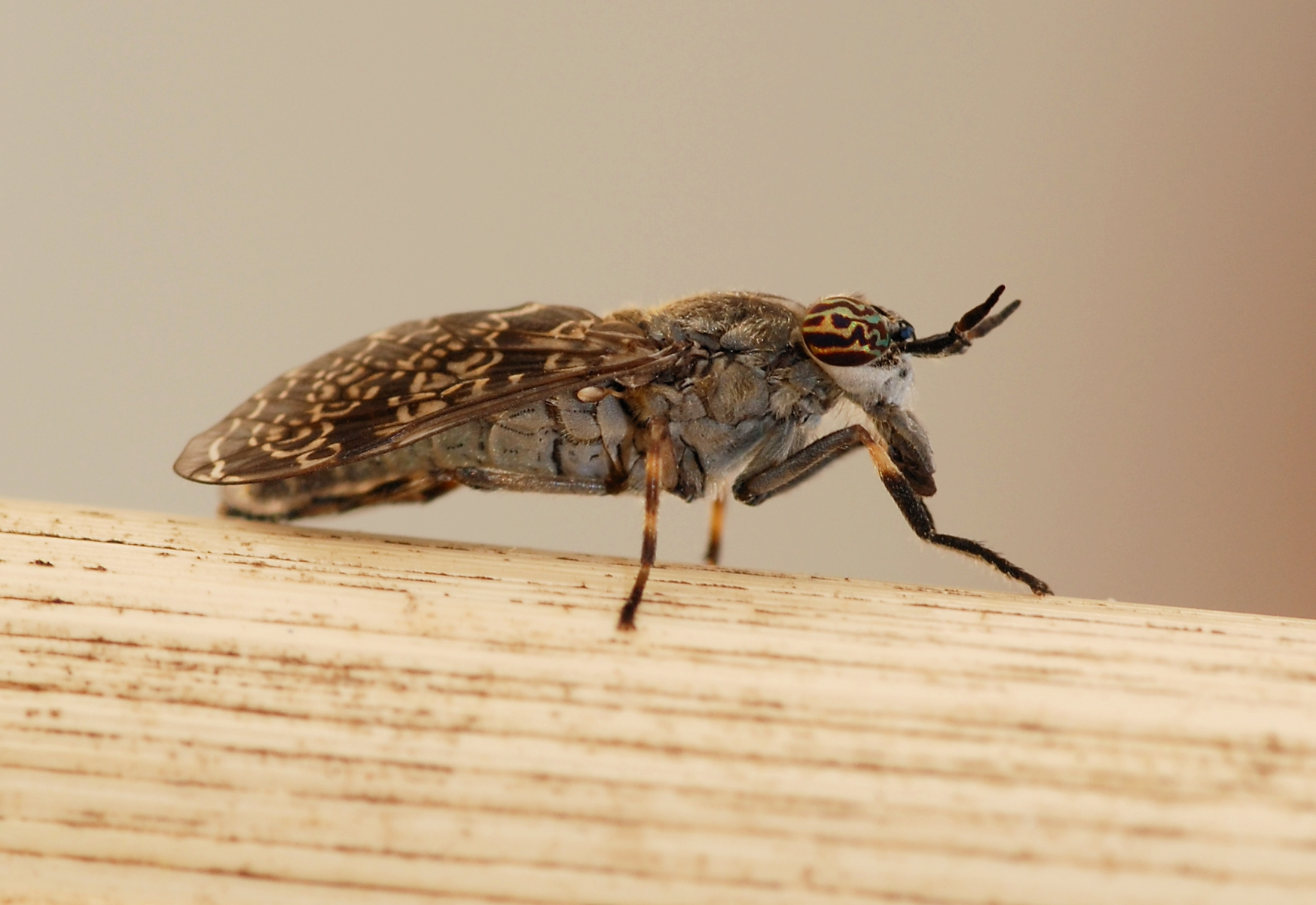
Haematopota pseudolusitanica

== Distribution ==
The species is found in Portugal, Spain, France, and Morocco.
