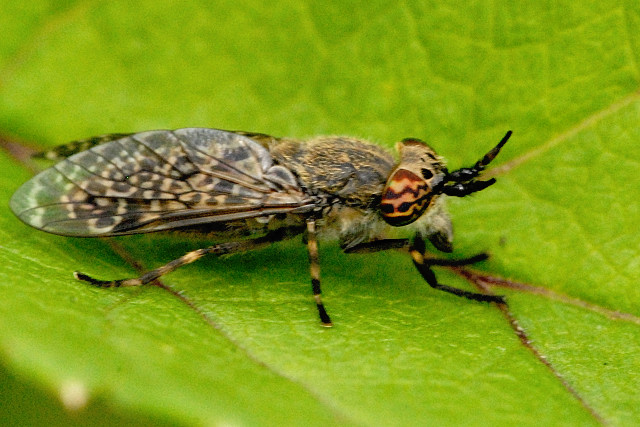

Scientific classification
- Kingdom: Animalia
- Phylum: Arthropoda
- Class: Insecta
- Order: Diptera
- Family: Tabanidae
- Subfamily: Tabaninae
- Tribe: Haematopotini
- Genus: Haematopota
- Species: H. crassicornis

Binomial name
- Haematopota crassicornis Wahlberg, 1848

= Haematopota crassicornis =

Species of fly

Haematopota crassicornis, the black-horned cleg is a species in the horse-fly family, Tabanidae.

== Description ==
Haematopota crassicornis typically measures 7.5–11.5 millimetres (0.30–0.45 in) in length. It is generally dark in colour, and like most species of Haematopota it has three narrow, lighter longitudinal stripes mainly on its pro- and mesonotum. The abdomen is greyish. The antennae are black.

== Distribution ==
Haematopota crassicornis occurs widely throughout most of Europe, having been reported from the Iberian Peninsula in the west, to Russia in the east, Italy in the South, and much of Scandinavia and the British Isles in the north.

== Habitat ==
The preferred habitat of Haematopota crassicornis is moist woodland, with pond margins where they may lay their eggs.

== Ecology ==
The males of Haematopota crassicornis visit flowers for nectar. The females suck blood from various mammals, particularly from large species such as cattle and humans. The larvae live in moist soil, largely preying on small invertebrates such as other insects. The adults are most active from May to August but they still may be seen through September.
