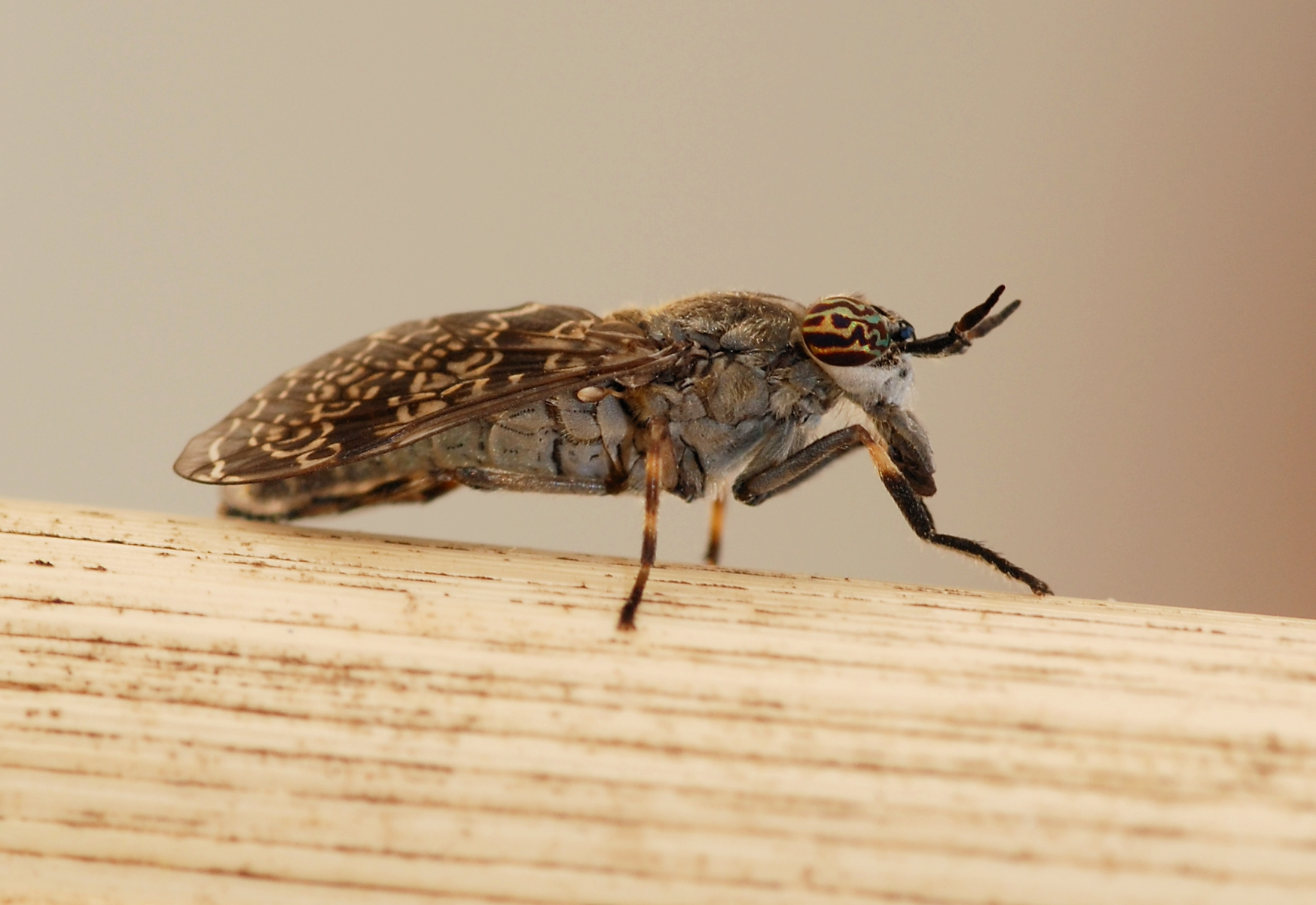
- Haematopota pseudolusitanica

Scientific classification
- Kingdom: Animalia
- Phylum: Arthropoda
- Clade: Pancrustacea
- Class: Insecta
- Order: Diptera
- Family: Tabanidae
- Subfamily: Tabaninae
- Tribe: Haematopotini
- Genus: Haematopota; Meigen, 1803

Type species
- Tabanus pluvialis Linnaeus, 1758

Synonyms
- Chrysozona Meigen, 1800

= Haematopota =

Genus of flies

Haematopota is a genus of flies in the horse-fly family, Tabanidae. Among the horse-flies, they are most commonly known as clegs. Many species have colorful, sinuously patterned eyes in life, a characteristic that fades after death. The wings are typically patterned with spots of grey. The genus is named from the Ancient Greek for blood-drinker: αἷμα, haîma, blood; πότης, pótës, drinker. Some species are known to be vectors of livestock diseases.

== Species ==
- Haematopota abacis (Philip, 1960)
- Haematopota abbreviata Philip, 1959
- Haematopota aberdarensis Oldroyd, 1952
- Haematopota abyssinica Surcouf, 1908
- Haematopota achlys Stone & Philip, 1974
- Haematopota adami Ovazza, Hamon & Rickenbach, 1956
- Haematopota adusta Stone & Philip, 1974
- Haematopota albalinea Xu & Liao, 1985
- Haematopota albicapilla Fain & Elsen, 1981
- Haematopota albihalter Stone & Philip, 1974
- Haematopota albihirta Karsch, 1888
- Haematopota albimanica Stone & Philip, 1974
- Haematopota albimedia Stone & Philip, 1974
- Haematopota albiocrea Stone & Philip, 1974
- Haematopota albofasciatipennis Brunetti, 1912
- Haematopota algira (Kröber, 1922)
- Haematopota aliena Oldroyd, 1952
- Haematopota alluaudi Surcouf, 1908
- Haematopota alticola (Philip, 1961)
- Haematopota altimontana Dias, 1993
- Haematopota alyta Stone & Philip, 1974
- Haematopota amala Stone & Philip, 1974
- Haematopota americana Osten Sacken, 1875
- Haematopota amicoi Dias, 1996
- Haematopota ampla Stone & Philip, 1974
- Haematopota angolensis Dias, 1989
- Haematopota angustifrons Carter, 1915
- Haematopota angustisegmentata Schuurmans Stekhoven, 1928
- Haematopota annandalei Ricardo, 1911
- Haematopota annulipes Schuurmans Stekhoven, 1926
- Haematopota anomala Dias, 1956
- Haematopota antennata (Shiraki, 1932)
- Haematopota aquilina (Séguy, 1934)
- Haematopota areei Stone & Philip, 1974
- Haematopota argentipes Oldroyd, 1952
- Haematopota arioi Dias, 1960
- Haematopota arrabidaensis Dias, 1985
- Haematopota assamensis Ricardo, 1911
- Haematopota athlyna Goodwin, 1981
- Haematopota atomaria Walker, 1856
- Haematopota atrata Szilády, 1926
- Haematopota atriventer Schuurmans Stekhoven, 1926
- Haematopota atropathenica Abbassian-Lintzen, 1964
- Haematopota aurescens Oldroyd, 1952
- Haematopota avida (Speiser, 1910)
- Haematopota ayresi Dias, 1960
- Haematopota bactriana (Olsufiev, 1939)
- Haematopota badia Philip, 1963
- Haematopota bantuana Oldroyd, 1952
- Haematopota barombi Oldroyd, 1952
- Haematopota barri Stone & Philip, 1974
- Haematopota barrosi Tendeiro, 1965
- Haematopota bashanensis Li & Yang, 1991
- Haematopota bealesi Coher, 1987
- Haematopota bedfordi Oldroyd, 1952
- Haematopota benoisti Séguy, 1930
- Haematopota bequaerti Burger, 1982
- Haematopota beringeri Austen, 1912
- Haematopota bicolor Stone & Philip, 1974
- Haematopota biguttata Stone & Philip, 1974
- Haematopota biharensis Stone & Philip, 1974
- Haematopota bilineata Ricardo, 1911
- Haematopota biorbis Stone & Philip, 1974
- Haematopota bipunctata Ricardo, 1906
- Haematopota biroi Szilády, 1926
- Haematopota bistrigata Loew, 1858
- Haematopota bizonata Schuurmans Stekhoven, 1932
- Haematopota borneana Rondani, 1875
- Haematopota bowdeni Oldroyd, 1952
- Haematopota brevicornis Austen, 1908
- Haematopota brevis Ricardo, 1906
- Haematopota brucei Austen, 1908
- Haematopota brulli Leclercq, 1960
- Haematopota brunnescens Ricardo, 1906
- Haematopota brunnicornis Wang, 1988
- Haematopota brunnipennis Ricardo, 1906
- Haematopota brunnipes Stone & Philip, 1974
- Haematopota brutsaerti Fain, 1947
- Haematopota bullatifrons Austen, 1908
- Haematopota burgeri Xu, 1999
- Haematopota burmanica Senior-White, 1922
- Haematopota burtoni Stone & Philip, 1974
- Haematopota burtti Oldroyd, 1952
- Haematopota caenofrons (Kröber, 1922)
- Haematopota camicasi Raymond & Chateau, 1977
- Haematopota cana Walker, 1848
- Haematopota canapicalis Oldroyd, 1952
- Haematopota casca Stone & Philip, 1974
- Haematopota caseiroi Dias, 1957
- Haematopota caspica Abbassian-Lintzen, 1960
- Haematopota castaneiventer Dias, 1959
- Haematopota castroi Dias, 1966
- Haematopota champlaini (Philip, 1953)
- Haematopota chekiangensis Ôuchi, 1940
- Haematopota chengyongi Xu & Guo, 2005
- Haematopota chinensis Ôuchi, 1940
- Haematopota chongoroiensis Dias, 1989
- Haematopota chvalai Stone & Philip, 1974
- Haematopota ciliatipes Bequaert, 1930
- Haematopota cilipes Bigot, 1890
- Haematopota cingalensis Ricardo, 1906
- Haematopota cingulata Wiedemann, 1828
- Haematopota circina Philip, 1963
- Haematopota circumscripta Loew, 1858
- Haematopota clarkana Stone & Philip, 1974
- Haematopota claudinae Leclercq, 1955
- Haematopota coalescens Oldroyd, 1952
- Haematopota cognata (Grünberg, 1906)
- Haematopota comodoliacis Leclercq, 1980
- Haematopota completa (Oldroyd, 1939)
- Haematopota concentralis Walker, 1848
- Haematopota concurrens Oldroyd, 1952
- Haematopota coninckae Dias, 1993
- Haematopota contracta Stone & Philip, 1974
- Haematopota coolsi Leclercq, 1966
- Haematopota copemanii Austen, 1908
- Haematopota cordigera Bigot, 1891
- Haematopota coronata Austen, 1908
- Haematopota corsoni Carter, 1915
- Haematopota crassicornis Wahlberg, 1848 — black-horned cleg
- Haematopota crassicrus Edwards, 1916
- Haematopota crassitibia Stone & Philip, 1974
- Haematopota crewei Oldroyd, 1952
- Haematopota cristata Schuurmans Stekhoven, 1926
- Haematopota crossi Stone & Philip, 1974
- Haematopota crudelis Austen, 1912
- Haematopota cruenta Austen, 1908
- Haematopota csikii Szilády, 1922
- Haematopota cynthiae Coher, 1987
- Haematopota darjeelingensis Datta, 1981
- Haematopota daveyi Austen, 1912
- Haematopota decora Walker, 1856
- Haematopota degenensis Wang, 1988
- Haematopota delicta Oldroyd, 1952
- Haematopota delozi Leclercq, 1966
- Haematopota demeilloni Stone & Philip, 1974
- Haematopota demellonis Senior-White, 1922
- Haematopota denshamii Austen, 1908
- Haematopota desertorum Szilády, 1923
- Haematopota dissimilis Ricardo, 1911
- Haematopota distincta Ricardo, 1906
- Haematopota divisapex Austen, 1908
- Haematopota dolondoloensis Dias, 1991
- Haematopota dubiosa Dias, 1964
- Haematopota dukei Ovazza & Mouchet, 1967
- Haematopota duplicata Loew, 1858
- Haematopota duttoni Newstead, Dutton & Todd, 1907
- Haematopota echma Stone & Philip, 1974
- Haematopota edax Austen, 1914
- Haematopota elegans Schuurmans Stekhoven, 1926
- Haematopota elephantina Oldroyd, 1952
- Haematopota enriquei Leclercq, 1971
- Haematopota ensifer Schuurmans Stekhoven, 1926
- Haematopota epoptica (Séguy, 1953)
- Haematopota equina Stone & Philip, 1974
- Haematopota equitibiata Schuurmans Stekhoven, 1926
- Haematopota erlangshanensis Xu, 1980
- Haematopota erythromera Oldroyd, 1952
- Haematopota eugeniae Portillo & Schacht, 1984
- Haematopota evanescens Oldroyd, 1952
- Haematopota excipula Coher, 1987
- Haematopota exiguicornuta Carter, 1915
- Haematopota faini Oldroyd, 1952
- Haematopota fairchildi Xu, 1999
- Haematopota famicis Stone & Philip, 1974
- Haematopota fariai Dias, 1964
- Haematopota fasciata Ricardo, 1911
- Haematopota fasciatapex Edwards, 1916
- Haematopota fenestralis Oldroyd, 1952
- Haematopota ferruginea Oldroyd, 1952
- Haematopota festiva Oldroyd, 1952
- Haematopota fiadeiroi Dias, 1964
- Haematopota flavicornis Szilády, 1926
- Haematopota flavipuncta Stone & Philip, 1974
- Haematopota fletcheri Stone & Philip, 1974
- Haematopota fonsecai Dias, 1956
- Haematopota fontesi Dias & Serrano, 1967
- Haematopota formosana Shiraki, 1918
- Haematopota fradei Dias, 1968
- Haematopota fraterna Oldroyd, 1952
- Haematopota fukienensis Stone & Philip, 1974
- Haematopota fulva Austen, 1908
- Haematopota fulvipes Stone & Philip, 1974
- Haematopota fumigata Schuurmans Stekhoven, 1926
- Haematopota furians Edwards, 1916
- Haematopota furtiva Austen, 1908
- Haematopota furva Austen, 1912
- Haematopota fusca Austen, 1908
- Haematopota fuscicornis (Becker & Stein, 1913)
- Haematopota fuscolimbata Fain, 1947
- Haematopota fuscomarginata Dias, 1974
- Haematopota gabuensis Tendeiro, 1965
- Haematopota gallica Szilády, 1923
- Haematopota gallii Bouvier, 1936
- Haematopota gamae Dias, 1991
- Haematopota germaini Ovazza & Mouchet, 1967
- Haematopota giganticornuta Dias, 1960
- Haematopota glenni Philip, 1963
- Haematopota gobindai Coher, 1987
- Haematopota gracai Dias, 1964
- Haematopota gracilicornis Stone & Philip, 1974
- Haematopota gracilis Austen, 1908
- Haematopota graeca Szilády, 1923
- Haematopota grahami Austen, 1912
- Haematopota grandis Meigen, 1820 — long-horned cleg
- Haematopota grandvauxi Dias, 1973
- Haematopota gregoryi Stone & Philip, 1974
- Haematopota greniere Ovazza, 1956
- Haematopota gressitti Philip, 1963
- Haematopota griseicoxa Oldroyd, 1952
- Haematopota guacangshanensis Xu, 1980
- Haematopota guangxiensis Xu, 2002
- Haematopota guineensis Bigot, 1891
- Haematopota hainani Stone & Philip, 1974
- Haematopota hakusanensis Togashi, 1977
- Haematopota hanzhongensis Xu, Li & Yang, 1987
- Haematopota hardyi Stone & Philip, 1974
- Haematopota harpax Austen, 1914
- Haematopota hastata Austen, 1914
- Haematopota hedini (Kröber, 1933)
- Haematopota helviventer Stone & Philip, 1974
- Haematopota hennauxi Leclercq, 1967
- Haematopota heptagramma (Speiser, 1915)
- Haematopota hieroglyphica Gerstaecker, 1871
- Haematopota hikosanensis Hayakawa & Takahasi, 1977
- Haematopota hindostani Ricardo, 1917
- Haematopota hirsuta Fain, 1947
- Haematopota hirsuticornis Oldroyd, 1952
- Haematopota hirsutitarsus Austen, 1908
- Haematopota hirta Ricardo, 1906
- Haematopota holtmanni Stone & Philip, 1974
- Haematopota horrida Oldroyd, 1952
- Haematopota hostilis Austen, 1908
- Haematopota howarthi Stone & Philip, 1974
- Haematopota iavana Wiedemann, 1821
- Haematopota imbrium Wiedemann, 1828
- Haematopota immaculata Ricardo, 1911
- Haematopota inconspicua Ricardo, 1911
- Haematopota incrassicornis Fain & Elsen, 1981
- Haematopota indiana Bigot, 1891
- Haematopota infernalis Oldroyd, 1952
- Haematopota inflaticornis Austen, 1908
- Haematopota ingluviosa Austen, 1914
- Haematopota innominata Austen, 1920
- Haematopota inornata Austen, 1908
- Haematopota insidiatrix Austen, 1908
- Haematopota intermedia Schuurmans Stekhoven, 1926
- Haematopota intrincata Dias, 1985
- Haematopota irregularis Schuurmans Stekhoven, 1926
- Haematopota irritans Oldroyd, 1952
- Haematopota irrorata Macquart, 1838
- Haematopota italica Meigen, 1804 — Italian cleg
- Haematopota jacobsoni Schuurmans Stekhoven, 1926
- Haematopota jellisoni (Philip, 1960)
- Haematopota jianzhongi Xu & Guo, 2005
- Haematopota jiri Chvála, 1969
- Haematopota kansuensis (Kröber, 1933)
- Haematopota kashmirensis Stone & Philip, 1974
- Haematopota katangaensis Oldroyd, 1952
- Haematopota kaulbacki Stone & Philip, 1974
- Haematopota kemali Szilády, 1923
- Haematopota keralaensis Kapoor, Grewal & Sharma, 1991
- Haematopota kerri Stone & Philip, 1974
- Haematopota kivuensis Dias, 1960
- Haematopota knekidis Stone & Philip, 1974
- Haematopota koryoensis (Shiraki, 1932)
- Haematopota kouzuensis (Takahasi, 1950)
- Haematopota krombeini Stone & Philip, 1974
- Haematopota lacessens Austen, 1908
- Haematopota lambi Villeneuve, 1921
- Haematopota lamborni Oldroyd, 1952
- Haematopota lamottei (Séguy, 1953)
- Haematopota lancangjiangensis Xu, 1980
- Haematopota lasiops (Oldroyd, 1940)
- Haematopota latebricola Austen, 1925
- Haematopota lathami Surcouf, 1908
- Haematopota latifascia Ricardo, 1911
- Haematopota laverani Surcouf, 1907
- Haematopota leclercqui Dias, 1960
- Haematopota lepointei Ovazza, 1957
- Haematopota lewisi Oldroyd, 1952
- Haematopota libera Stone & Philip, 1974
- Haematopota limai Dias & Serrano, 1967
- Haematopota limbata Bigot, 1891
- Haematopota lineata Philip, 1963
- Haematopota lineola (Philip, 1960)
- Haematopota lineota (Philip, 1960)
- Haematopota litoralis Ricardo, 1913
- Haematopota lobatoi Dias, 1962
- Haematopota longa Ricardo, 1906
- Haematopota longeantennata (Olsufiev, 1937)
- Haematopota longipennis Stone & Philip, 1974
- Haematopota lukiangensis (Liu & Wang, 1977)
- Haematopota lunai Dias, 1960
- Haematopota machadoi Dias, 1958
- Haematopota maculata Meijere, 1911
- Haematopota maculiplena Karsch, 1888
- Haematopota maculosifacies Austen, 1914
- Haematopota magnifica Dias, 1960
- Haematopota malabarica Stone & Philip, 1974
- Haematopota malacrizi Dias, 1964
- Haematopota malayensis Ricardo, 1916
- Haematopota malefica Austen, 1908
- Haematopota mangkamensis Wang, 1982
- Haematopota marakuetana (Séguy, 1938)
- Haematopota marceli Stone & Philip, 1974
- Haematopota marginata Ricardo, 1911
- Haematopota marthae Leclercq, 1955
- Haematopota masseyi Austen, 1908
- Haematopota matherani Szilády, 1926
- Haematopota matosi Dias, 1960
- Haematopota megaera Usher, 1965
- Haematopota meglaensis Wu & Xu, 1992
- Haematopota melloi Stone & Philip, 1974
- Haematopota mendesi Dias & Serrano, 1967
- Haematopota mendossaorum Dias, 1992
- Haematopota mengdingensis Xu & Guo, 2005
- Haematopota menglaensis Wu & Xu, 1992
- Haematopota mephista Usher, 1965
- Haematopota meteorica Corti, 1895
- Haematopota microcera (Séguy, 1938)
- Haematopota mingqingi Xu & Guo, 2005
- Haematopota minuscula Austen, 1920
- Haematopota minuscularia Austen, 1920
- Haematopota mlanjensis Oldroyd, 1952
- Haematopota mokanshanensis Ôuchi, 1940
- Haematopota molesta Austen, 1908
- Haematopota montana Ricardo, 1917
- Haematopota monteiroi Dias, 1964
- Haematopota monticola (Philip, 1959)
- Haematopota montisdraconis Usher, 1965
- Haematopota mordax Surcouf, 1908
- Haematopota mordens Edwards, 1916
- Haematopota moreli Tendeiro, 1965
- Haematopota mouchai Stone & Philip, 1974
- Haematopota mouzinhoi Dias, 1960
- Haematopota mukteswarensis Kapoor, Grewal & Sharma, 1991
- Haematopota nagashimai Hayakawa & Takahasi, 1976
- Haematopota nasuensis Hayakawa & Moriyama, 1981
- Haematopota nathani Stone & Philip, 1974
- Haematopota neavei Austen, 1912
- Haematopota nefanda Edwards, 1916
- Haematopota nefandoides Oldroyd, 1952
- Haematopota nepalensis Stone & Philip, 1974
- Haematopota newtoni Dias, 1972
- Haematopota nigriantenna Wang, 1982
- Haematopota nigricans Schuurmans Stekhoven, 1926
- Haematopota nigrifrons Datta & Biswas, 1977
- Haematopota nigripennis Austen, 1914
- Haematopota nigrita Schuurmans Stekhoven, 1926
- Haematopota nigrocinerea Oldroyd, 1950
- Haematopota nigrofusca Dias, 1966
- Haematopota nitidifacies Oldroyd, 1952
- Haematopota nobilis (Grünberg, 1906)
- Haematopota nobrei Dias, 1964
- Haematopota nocens Austen, 1908
- Haematopota nociva Austen, 1908
- Haematopota noxialis Austen, 1908
- Haematopota nubilis (Hauser, 1960)
- Haematopota obscura Loew, 1858
- Haematopota obsoleta Edwards, 1916
- Haematopota ocellata Wiedemann, 1819
- Haematopota ocelligera (Kröber, 1922)
- Haematopota ochracea (Bezzi, 1908)
- Haematopota okui Ovazza & Mouchet, 1967
- Haematopota oldroydi Dias, 1954
- Haematopota olsufjevi (Liu, 1960)
- Haematopota omeishanensis Xu, 1980
- Haematopota oporina Stone & Philip, 1974
- Haematopota orba Stone & Philip, 1974
- Haematopota ovazzai Dias, 1956
- Haematopota pachycera Bigot, 1890
- Haematopota paisanai Dias & Sous, 1958
- Haematopota palancaensis Dias, 1972
- Haematopota pallens Loew, 1871
- Haematopota pallida Stone & Philip, 1974
- Haematopota pallidimarginata Austen, 1908
- Haematopota pallidipennis Austen, 1908
- Haematopota pallidula (Kröber, 1922)
- Haematopota paratruncata (Wang & Liu, 1977)
- Haematopota pardalina Oldroyd, 1952
- Haematopota partifascia Bequaert, 1930
- Haematopota passosi Dias, 1973
- Haematopota patellicornis (Enderlein, 1922)
- Haematopota pattoni Stone & Philip, 1974
- Haematopota paucipunctata Schuurmans Stekhoven, 1926
- Haematopota paulettae Fain, 1947
- Haematopota pavlovskii (Hauser, 1960)
- Haematopota pearsoni Oldroyd, 1957
- Haematopota pechumani Stone & Philip, 1974
- Haematopota pekingensis (Liu, 1958)
- Haematopota pellucida (Surcouf, 1909)
- Haematopota pendleburyi Stone & Philip, 1974
- Haematopota pereirai Dias, 1963
- Haematopota perplexa Dias, 1960
- Haematopota personata Philip, 1963
- Haematopota pertinens Austen, 1908
- Haematopota perturbans Edwards, 1916
- Haematopota peusi Oldroyd, 1952
- Haematopota philipi Chvála, 1969
- Haematopota picea Stone & Philip, 1974
- Haematopota picta Surcouf, 1908
- Haematopota pilosifemura Xu, 1980
- Haematopota pinguicornis Carter, 1915
- Haematopota pinicola Stuckenberg, 1975
- Haematopota piresi Dias & Sous, 1957
- Haematopota pisinna Stone & Philip, 1974
- Haematopota pluvialis (Linnaeus, 1758) — notch-horned cleg
- Haematopota pollinantenna Xu & Liao, 1985
- Haematopota pottsi Oldroyd, 1952
- Haematopota pratasi Dias, 1960
- Haematopota procyon Stone & Philip, 1974
- Haematopota prolixa Stone & Philip, 1974
- Haematopota przewalskii Olsufiev, 1979
- Haematopota pseudolusitanica Szilády, 1923
- Haematopota pseudomachadoi Dias, 1960
- Haematopota pulchella Edwards, 1916
- Haematopota punctifera Bigot, 1891
- Haematopota punctulata Macquart, 1838
- Haematopota pungens Doleschall, 1856
- Haematopota pygmaea (Enderlein, 1922)
- Haematopota qilianshanensis He, Liu & Xu, 2008
- Haematopota qionghaiensis Xu, 1980
- Haematopota quadrifenestrata Burger, 1988
- Haematopota quartaui Dias, 1985
- Haematopota quathlambia Usher, 1965
- Haematopota qui Xu, 1999
- Haematopota rabida Edwards, 1916
- Haematopota rafaeli Dias, 1966
- Haematopota rara Johnson, 1912
- Haematopota recurrens Loew, 1858
- Haematopota remota Oldroyd, 1952
- Haematopota restricta Oldroyd, 1952
- Haematopota ribeirorum Dias, 1984
- Haematopota rohtakensis Kapoor, Grewal & Sharma, 1991
- Haematopota roralis Fabricius, 1805
- Haematopota rubens Austen, 1912
- Haematopota rubida Ricardo, 1906
- Haematopota rubidicornis Oldroyd, 1952
- Haematopota rufipennis Bigot, 1891
- Haematopota rufula (Surcouf, 1909)
- Haematopota ruwenzorii Dias, 1993
- Haematopota sabiensis Dias & Sous, 1957
- Haematopota saccae Leclercq, 1967
- Haematopota saegeri Leclercq, 1961
- Haematopota salomae Dias, 1991
- Haematopota sanguinaria Austen, 1908
- Haematopota saravanensis Xu, 1999
- Haematopota sauli Dias, 1960
- Haematopota scanloni Stone & Philip, 1974
- Haematopota schmidi Stone & Philip, 1974
- Haematopota schoutedeni (Surcouf, 1911)
- Haematopota scutellaris Loew, 1858
- Haematopota scutellata (Olsufiev, Moucha & Chvála, 1964)
- Haematopota semiclara Austen, 1908
- Haematopota serranoi Dias, 1984
- Haematopota sewelli Austen, 1920
- Haematopota seydeli Oldroyd, 1952
- Haematopota shinonagai Hayakawa, 1977
- Haematopota sica Oldroyd, 1952
- Haematopota sidamensis Surcouf, 1908
- Haematopota sikkimensis Stone & Philip, 1974
- Haematopota similis Ricardo, 1906
- Haematopota sinensis Ricardo, 1911
- Haematopota sineroides Xu, 1989
- Haematopota singarensis Stone & Philip, 1974
- Haematopota singularis Ricardo, 1908
- Haematopota sobrina (Kröber, 1922)
- Haematopota sofalensis Dias, 1957
- Haematopota sparsa Stone & Philip, 1974
- Haematopota spectabilis Oldroyd, 1952
- Haematopota spenceri Stone & Philip, 1974
- Haematopota sphaerocallus (Wang & Liu, 1977)
- Haematopota splendens Schuurmans Stekhoven, 1926
- Haematopota stackelbergi Olsufiev, 1967
- Haematopota stimulans Austen, 1908
- Haematopota stonei Thompson, 1977
- Haematopota striata Stone & Philip, 1974
- Haematopota subcylindrica Pandellé, 1883 — Levels cleg
- Haematopota subirrorata Xu, 1980
- Haematopota subkoryoensis Xu & Sun, 2013
- Haematopota subturkestanica Wang, 1985
- Haematopota sumelae Timmer, 1984
- Haematopota surugaensis Hayakawa & Takahasi, 1977
- Haematopota tabanula Bequaert, 1930
- Haematopota taciturna Austen, 1908
- Haematopota takensis Stone & Philip, 1974
- Haematopota tamerlani Szilády, 1923
- Haematopota taunggyiensis Stone & Philip, 1974
- Haematopota tchivinguiroensis Dias, 1991
- Haematopota teixeirai Dias, 1974
- Haematopota tenasserimi Szilády, 1926
- Haematopota tendeiroi Dias, 1959
- Haematopota tenuicrus Austen, 1908
- Haematopota tenuis Austen, 1908
- Haematopota tessellata Ricardo, 1906
- Haematopota theobaldi Carter, 1915
- Haematopota thurmanorum Stone & Philip, 1974
- Haematopota tiomanensis Stone & Philip, 1974
- Haematopota tonkiniana Szilády, 1926
- Haematopota torquens Austen, 1908
- Haematopota torrevillasi Stone & Philip, 1974
- Haematopota tosta Stone & Philip, 1974
- Haematopota touratieri Dias, 1996
- Haematopota toyamensis Watanabe, Kamimura & Takahasi, 1976
- Haematopota transiens Oldroyd, 1952
- Haematopota travassosdiasi Tendeiro, 1965
- Haematopota triatipennis Brunetti, 1912
- Haematopota tuberculata Meijere, 1911
- Haematopota tumidicornis Austen, 1912
- Haematopota turkestanica (Kröber, 1922)
- Haematopota u-nigrum Stone & Philip, 1974
- Haematopota ugandae Ricardo, 1906
- Haematopota unicolor Ricardo, 1906
- Haematopota unizonata Ricardo, 1906
- Haematopota ustulata (Kröber, 1933)
- Haematopota valadonis Dias, 1966
- Haematopota variantenna Xu & Sun, 2008
- Haematopota variantennata Xu & Sun, 2013
- Haematopota variegata var. rotundata Szilády, 1923
- Haematopota varifrons Stone & Philip, 1974
- Haematopota vassali Stone & Philip, 1974
- Haematopota veigasimonis Dias, 1966
- Haematopota vexans Austen, 1908
- Haematopota vexativa Xu, 1989
- Haematopota vicentei Dias, 1966
- Haematopota vicina Surcouf, 1908
- Haematopota vieirai Dias, 1960
- Haematopota vilhenai Dias, 1957
- Haematopota vimoli Coher, 1987
- Haematopota virgatipennis Austen, 1908
- Haematopota vittata Loew, 1858
- Haematopota volneri (Philip, 1959)
- Haematopota vulcan Oldroyd, 1952
- Haematopota vulnerans (Surcouf, 1909)
- Haematopota vulnifica (Séguy, 1938)
- Haematopota whartoni Stone & Philip, 1974
- Haematopota willistoni (Philip, 1953)
- Haematopota wittei Oldroyd, 1950
- Haematopota wuzhishanensis Xu, 1980
- Haematopota yanggangi Xu & Guo, 2005
- Haematopota yongpingi Xu & Guo, 2005
- Haematopota yungani Stone & Philip, 1974
- Haematopota yunnanensis Stone & Philip, 1974
- Haematopota yunnanoides Xu, 1991
- Haematopota yunnanoides Xu, 1991
- Haematopota zambeziaca Dias & Sous, 1957
- Haematopota zengjiani Xu & Guo, 2005
- Haematopota zombaensis Oldroyd, 1952
- Haematopota zophera Stone & Philip, 1974
- Haematopota zuluensis Oldroyd, 1952
