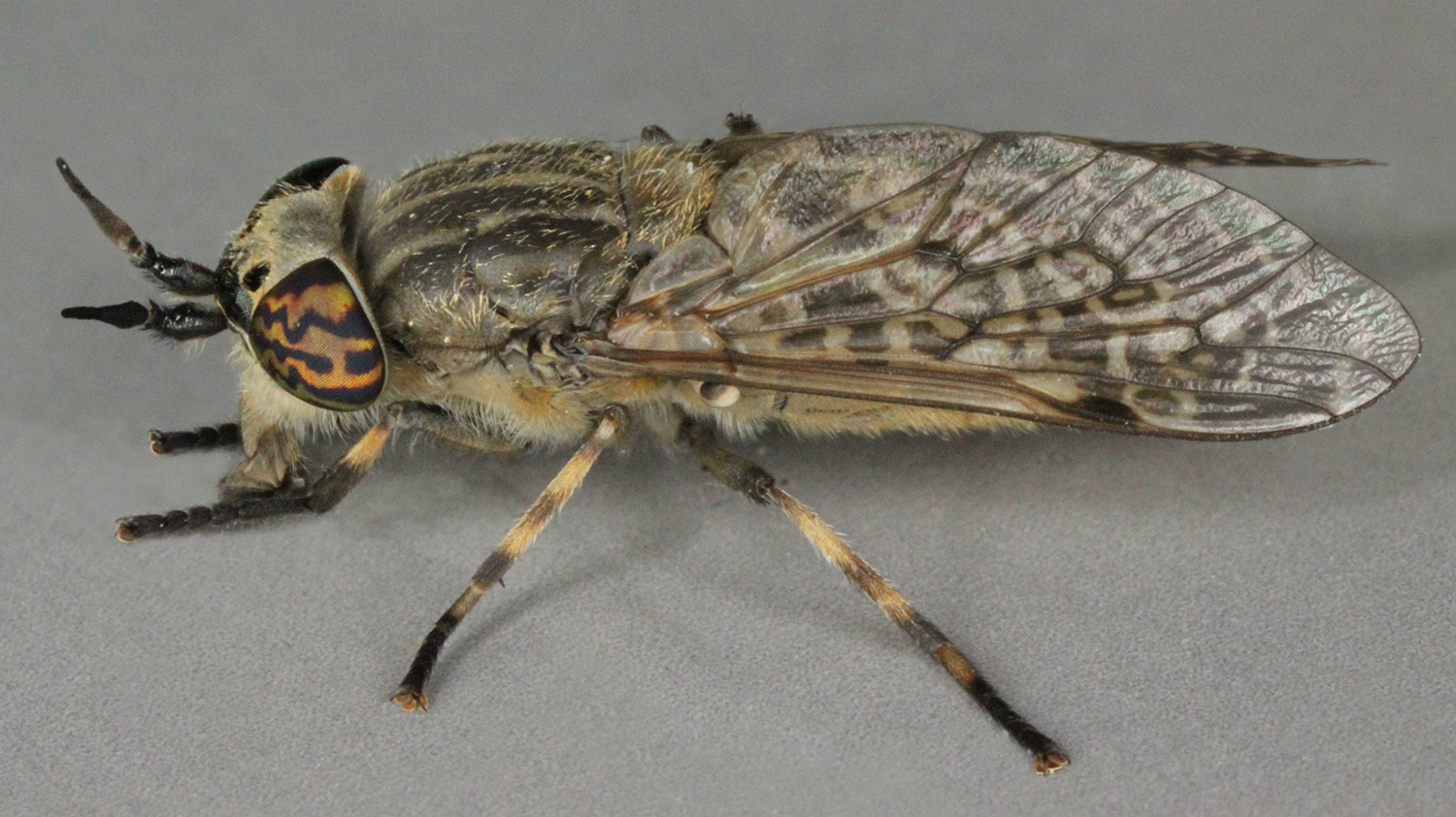
- Haematopota pluvialis female

Scientific classification
- Domain: Eukaryota
- Kingdom: Animalia
- Phylum: Arthropoda
- Class: Insecta
- Order: Diptera
- Family: Tabanidae
- Subfamily: Tabaninae
- Tribe: Haematopotini; Bequaert, 1930

Synonyms
- Haematopotinae Enderlein, 1922; Chrysozoninae Hendel, 1936; Chrysozonini Philip, 1941

= Haematopotini =

Tribe of flies

Haematopotini is a tribe of horse flies, also known as clegs and deer flies, in the family Tabanidae.

== Genera ==
BioLib includes:

- Haematopota Meigen, 1803
- Heptatoma Meigen, 1803
- Hippocentrodes Philip, 1961
- Hippocentrum Austen, 1908
