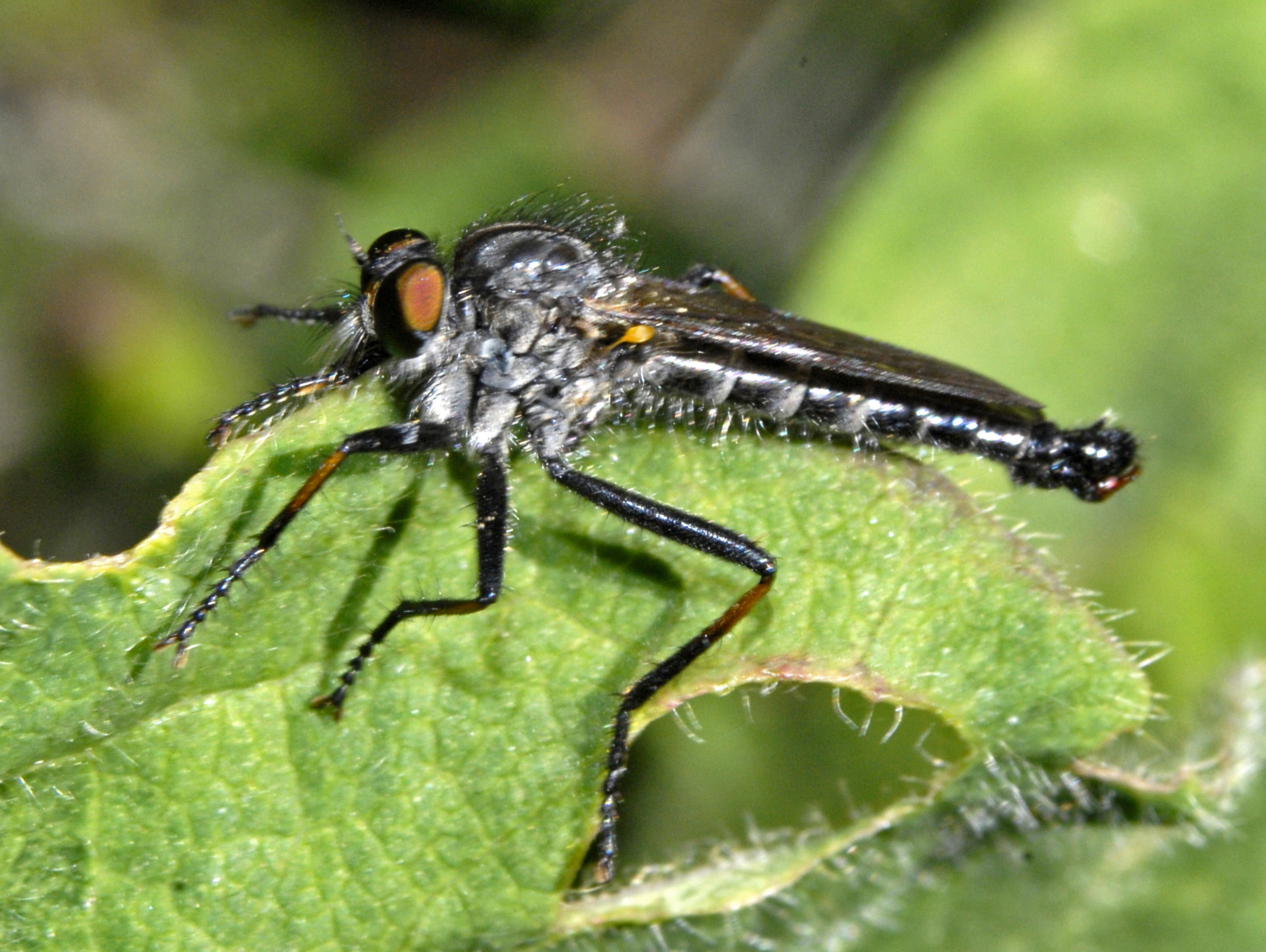
- Neoitamus cothurnatus Male

Scientific classification
- Kingdom: Animalia
- Phylum: Arthropoda
- Clade: Pancrustacea
- Class: Insecta
- Order: Diptera
- Family: Asilidae
- Genus: Neoitamus
- Species: N. cothurnatus

Binomial name
- Neoitamus cothurnatus (Meigen, 1820)

Synonyms
- Asilus aestivus Zetterstedt, 1842; Asilus nebulosus Matsumura, 1911

= Neoitamus cothurnatus =

Species of insect

Neoitamus cothurnatus, the scarce awl robberfly, is a species of 'robber fly' belonging to the family Asilidae.

== Distribution ==
This species is present in Europe.

== Description ==
Neoitamus cothurnatus can reach a body length of about 12–17 millimetres (0.47–0.67 in).

== Identification ==
It is a small, grey-black asilid (10-15 mm.) Difficult to distinguish from other Neoitamus. Wolff, Gebel and Geller-Grimm (2021), Majer (1997), van den Broek (1979), and Stubbs and Drake (2001) all provide keys, descriptions and illustrations. Older works are also useful, e.g., Seguy (1920), Verrall (1909), and Oldroyd (1969). This species is rather similar to Neoitamus cyanurus. The latter shows more elongate and almost totally black hind basitarsi, that are mostly red in Neiotamus cothurnatus.

== Biology ==
These robberflies fly from end of May to middle of August.
