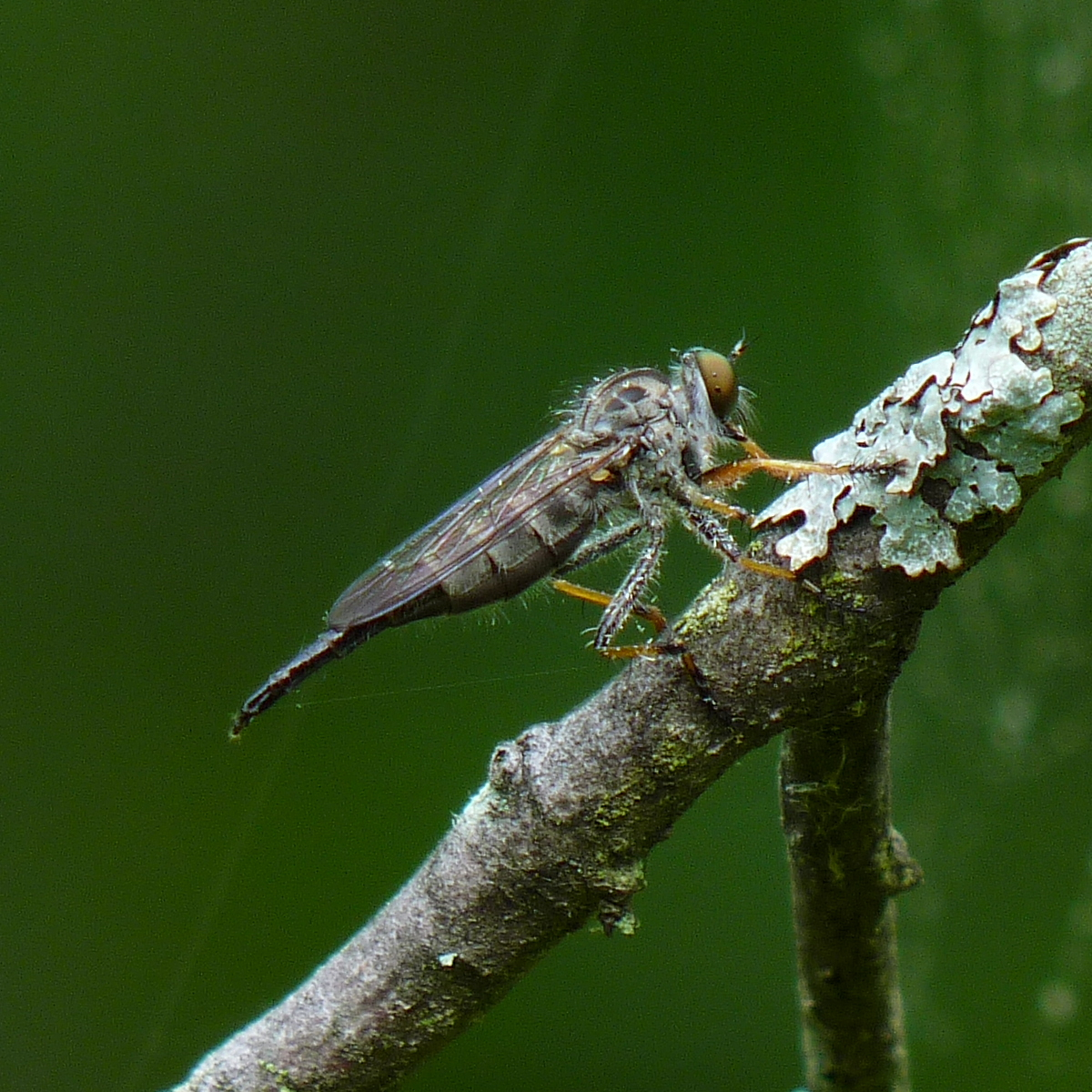

Scientific classification
- Domain: Eukaryota
- Kingdom: Animalia
- Phylum: Arthropoda
- Class: Insecta
- Order: Diptera
- Family: Asilidae
- Genus: Neoitamus
- Species: N. flavofemoratus

Binomial name
- Neoitamus flavofemoratus (Hine, 1909)

Synonyms
- Asilus flavipes Williston, 1893; Asilus flavofemoratus Hine, 1909

= Neoitamus flavofemoratus =

Species of fly

Neoitamus flavofemoratus is a species of robber flies in the family Asilidae.

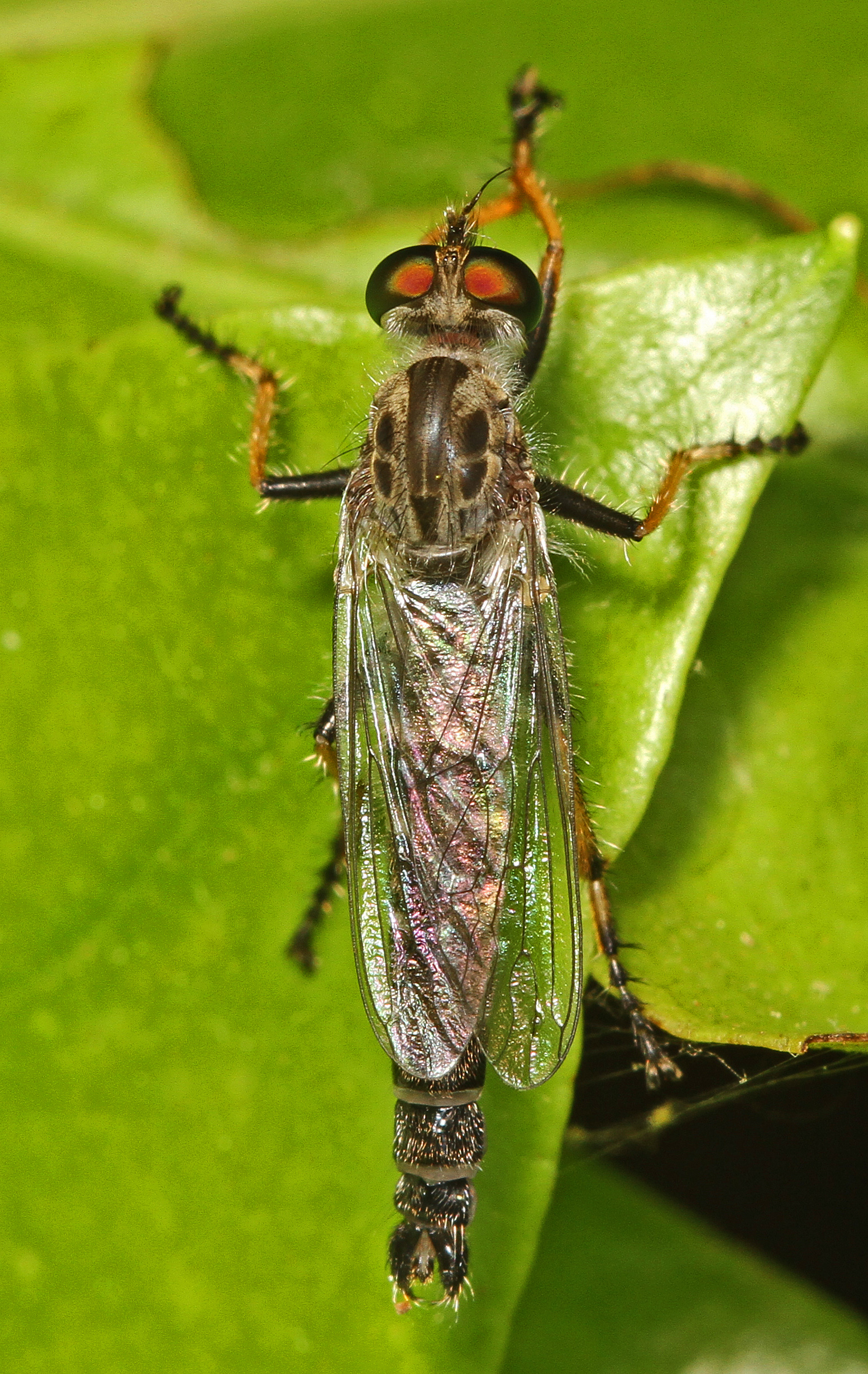
