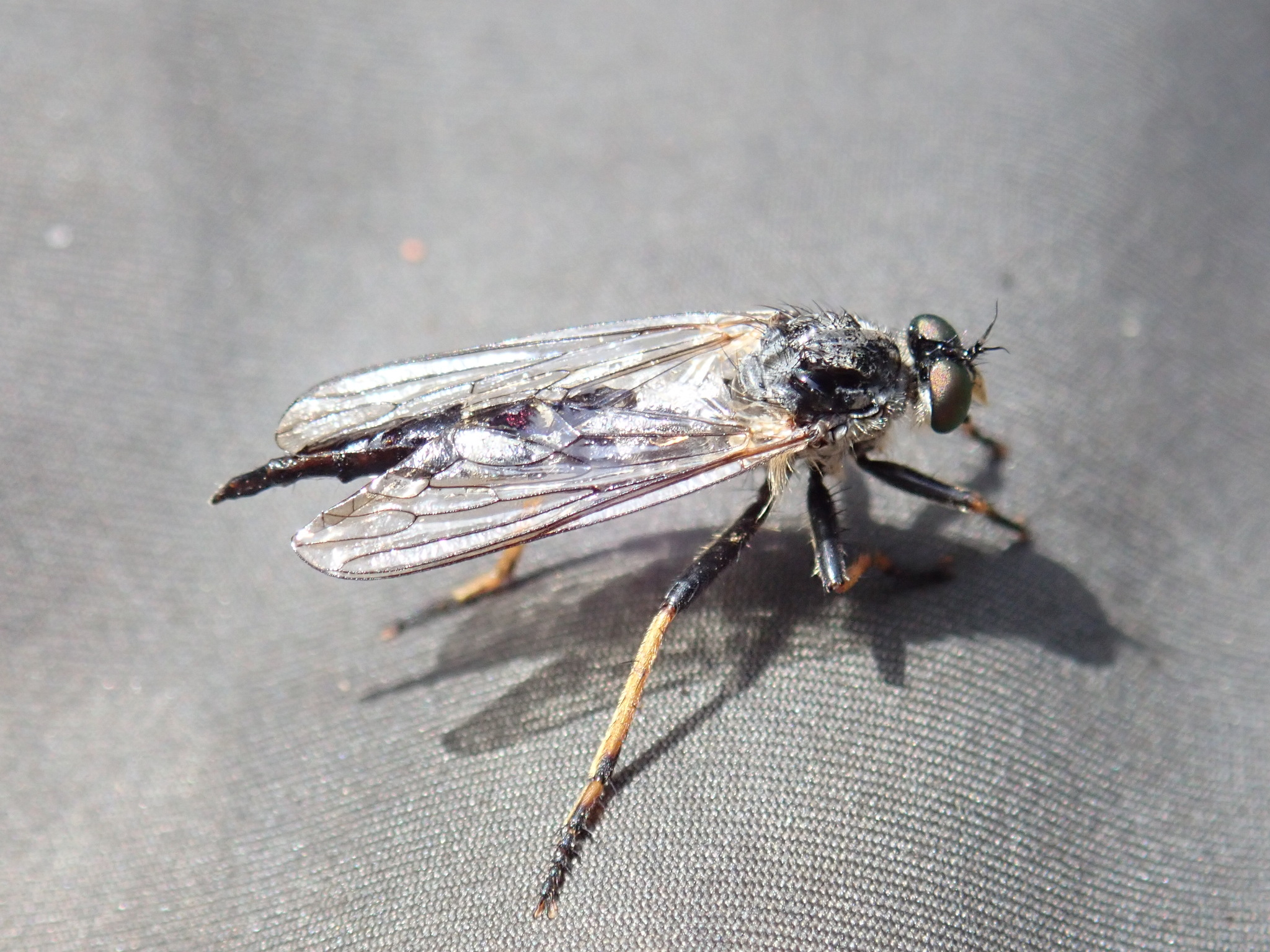

Scientific classification
- Kingdom: Animalia
- Phylum: Arthropoda
- Class: Insecta
- Order: Diptera
- Family: Asilidae
- Genus: Neoitamus
- Species: N. orphne

Binomial name
- Neoitamus orphne Walker, 1849

= Neoitamus orphne =

Species of fly

Neoitamus orphne is a species of robber flies in the family Asilidae.
