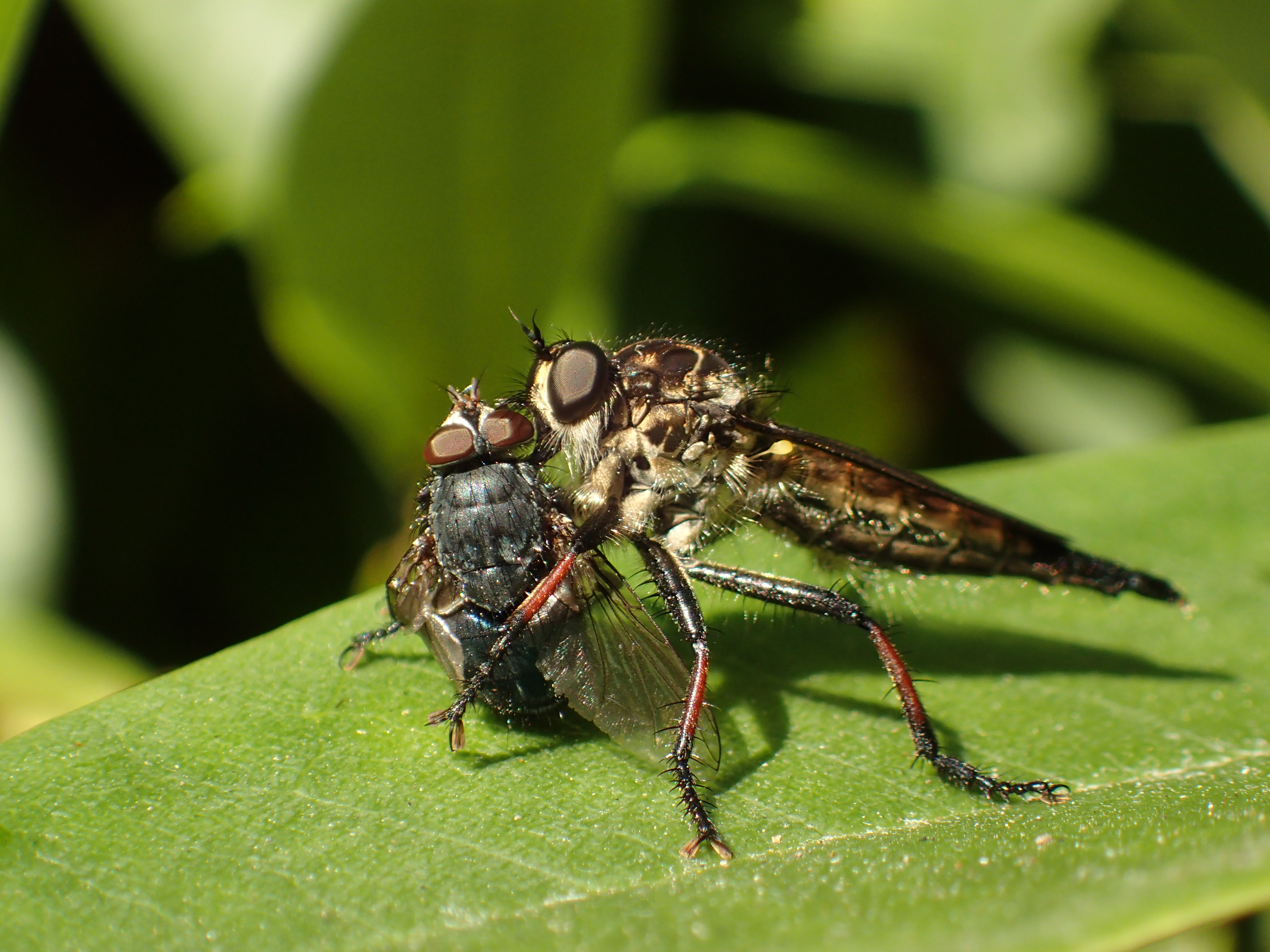

Scientific classification
- Kingdom: Animalia
- Phylum: Arthropoda
- Class: Insecta
- Order: Diptera
- Family: Asilidae
- Genus: Neoitamus
- Species: N. melanopogon

Binomial name
- Neoitamus melanopogon Schiner

= Neoitamus melanopogon =

Species of robber fly

Neoitamus melanopogon, commonly known by the name common robber fly, is a species of fly of Asilidae in the genus Neoitamus, found in both the principal islands of New Zealand.

== Description ==
The Northern common robber fly is an insect in the order of Diptera like flies and mosquitoes, so has 2 wings and 2 halteres used for stabilization. This allows it to stop and rollback really fast. It has a short proboscis with a piercing organ called hypopharynx to inject a neurotoxin to its preys. A proboscis is a part of the insect mouth which is used to suck nectar or blood and usually its shape is tubular. With its claws, it can catch and its prey. It can measure until 15mm long. It has hairy legs and wide eyes that give it a good 3D vision. The male has a bulbous genital organ at the end of the abdomen and the female has a pointed back end at the abdomen which is corresponding at the male's genital organ.

== Distribution ==
=== Natural global range ===
This species is an endemic species of New Zealand.

=== New Zealand range ===
This species can be found everywhere in both principal islands of New Zealand.

=== Habitat preferences ===
It prefers grassland and silver tussock to live, so can be found widely distributed across New Zealand. It also lives in forest clearings on both islands.

== Life cycle/phenology ==
It lays eggs directly on the soil or on plants. When the larva hatches, it may live either on or in the ground. When on the ground, it feeds on rotting organic matter.

There are four larval stages and one pupal stage. The full nature of their trophic regime and its mechanisms are not fully known, but all larva stages are predators same as adult stage.

== Diet and foraging ==
Neoitamus melanopogon is an insect predator. It can hunt many kinds of insects, such as Ant, bee or Butterfly. It jumps on their back and injects them a neurotoxin to paralyze them. After that, it sucks the organs inside its preys. The common robber fly can occasionally eat the queen of Solenopsis (ant) species during nuptial flights. Its larvae are also a predator in the soil (Macfarlane et al., 1999). This fly can also eat other Diptera and so other robber flies.
