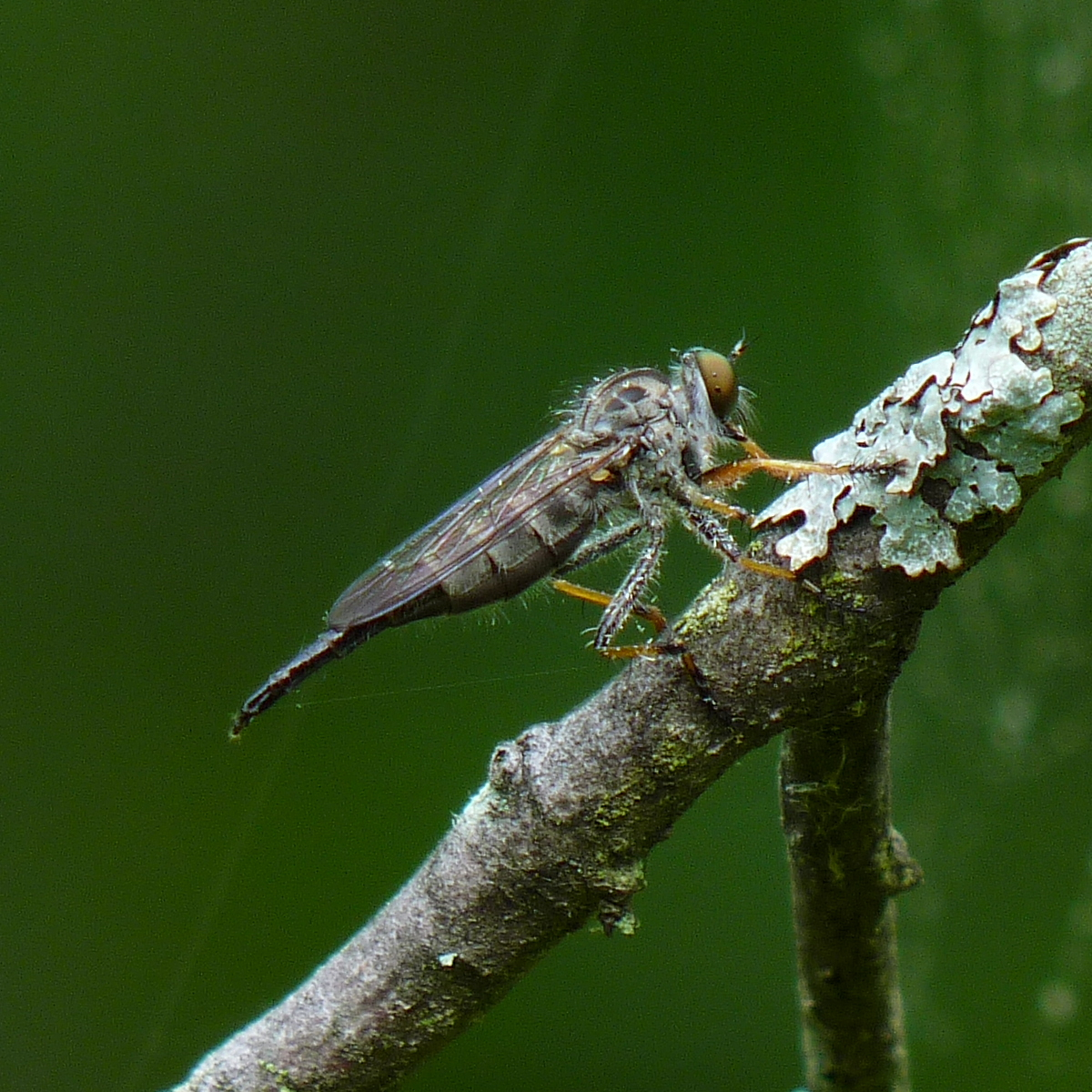
- Neoitamus flavofemoratus

Scientific classification
- Domain: Eukaryota
- Kingdom: Animalia
- Phylum: Arthropoda
- Class: Insecta
- Order: Diptera
- Family: Asilidae
- Subfamily: Asilinae
- Tribe: Asilini
- Genus: Neoitamus; Osten-Sacken, 1878

= Neoitamus =

Genus of flies

Neoitamus is a genus of robber flies in the family Asilidae. There are at least 60 described species in Neoitamus.

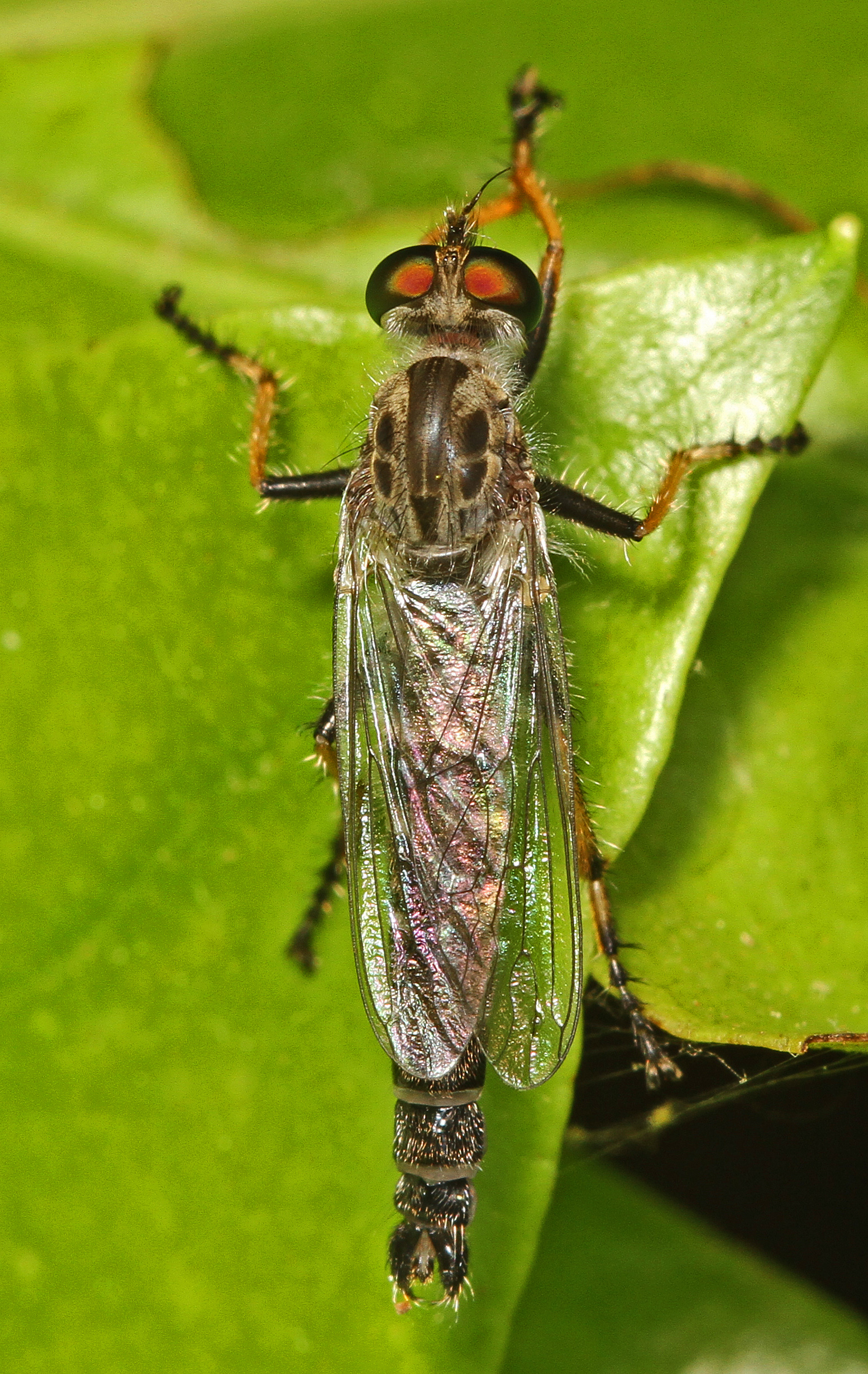
Neoitamus flavofemoratus

== Species ==
These 67 species belong to the genus Neoitamus:

- Neoitamus aestivus (Schrank, 1781)
- Neoitamus affinis (Williston, 1893)
- Neoitamus angusticornis (Loew, 1858)
- Neoitamus aurifer Hermann, 1917
- Neoitamus barsilensis Joseph & Parui, 1984
- Neoitamus belokobylskii Lehr, 1999
- Neoitamus brevicomus (Hine, 1909)
- Neoitamus bulbus (Walker, 1849)
- Neoitamus calcuttaensis Joseph & Parui, 1987
- Neoitamus castaneipennis Tagawa, 1981
- Neoitamus castellanii Hradsky, 1956
- Neoitamus castneipennis Tagawa, 1981
- Neoitamus coquilletti (Hine. 1909)
- Neoitamus coquillettii (Hine, 1909)
- Neoitamus cothurnatus (Meigen, 1820)
- Neoitamus cyaneocinctus (Pandelle, 1905)
- Neoitamus cyanurus (Loew, 1849)
- Neoitamus dasymallus (Gerstaecker, 1861)
- Neoitamus dhenkundensis Joseph & Parui, 1987
- Neoitamus dolichurus Becker, 1925
- Neoitamus fertilis Becker, 1925
- Neoitamus flavofemoratus (Hine, 1909)
- Neoitamus fraternus (Macquart, 1846)
- Neoitamus grahami Joseph & Parui, 1987
- Neoitamus grandis Ricardo, 1919
- Neoitamus himalayensis Joseph & Parui, 1985
- Neoitamus hyalipennis Ricardo, 1913
- Neoitamus impudicus (Gerstaecker, 1861)
- Neoitamus inornatus Ricardo, 1919
- Neoitamus ishiharai Tagawa, 1981
- Neoitamus javanensis Meijere, 1914
- Neoitamus khasiensis Bromley, 1935
- Neoitamus lascus (Walker, 1849)
- Neoitamus leucopogon Meijere, 1913
- Neoitamus maculatoides Hardy, 1920
- Neoitamus melanopogon (Schiner, 1868)
- Neoitamus meridionalis (Hutton, 1901)
- Neoitamus mistipes (Macquart, 1850)
- Neoitamus mussooriensis Joseph & Parui, 1984
- Neoitamus navasardiani Richter, 1963
- Neoitamus niger (De Geer, 1776)
- Neoitamus orphne Walker
- Neoitamus pediformis Becker, 1925
- Neoitamus peregrinus Carrera & Machado-Allison, 1963
- Neoitamus planiceps (Schiner, 1868)
- Neoitamus potanini Lehr, 1966
- Neoitamus richterievi Esipenko, 1972
- Neoitamus rubripes Hermann, 1917
- Neoitamus rubrofemoratus Ricardo, 1919
- Neoitamus rudis (Walker, 1855)
- Neoitamus sedlaceki Joseph & Parui, 1987
- Neoitamus senectus Richter, 1963
- Neoitamus setifemur Lehr, 1966
- Neoitamus smithii (Hutton, 1901)
- Neoitamus socius (Loew, 1871)
- Neoitamus splendidus Oldenberg, 1912
- Neoitamus strigipes Becker, 1925
- Neoitamus tabidus (Meigen, 1820)
- Neoitamus terminalis (Hine, 1909)
- Neoitamus tibialis (Fallen, 1814)
- Neoitamus tipuloides (Harris, 1780)
- Neoitamus tropicus Ricardo, 1919
- Neoitamus tumulus Tomasovic, 1999
- Neoitamus univittatus (Loew, 1871)
- Neoitamus veris Esipenko, 1974
- Neoitamus walkeri Daniels, 1989
- Neoitamus zouhari Hradsky, 1960
