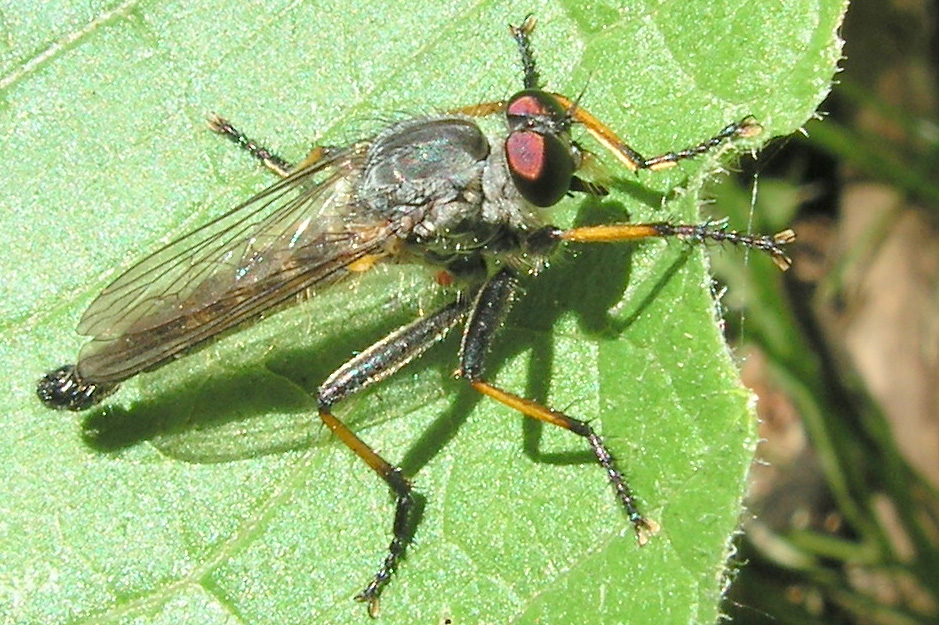
- Male
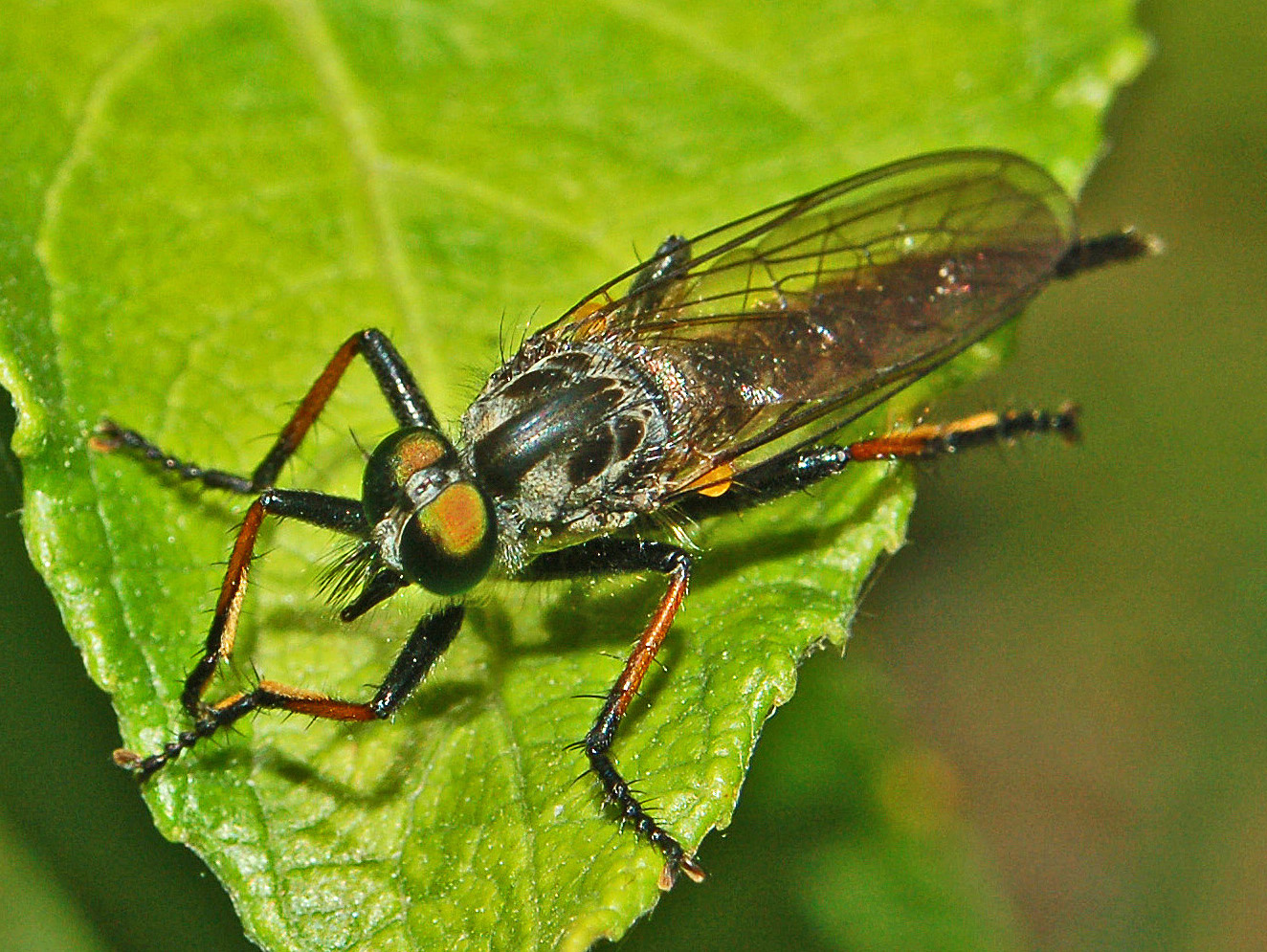
- Female

Scientific classification
- Kingdom: Animalia
- Phylum: Arthropoda
- Clade: Pancrustacea
- Class: Insecta
- Order: Diptera
- Family: Asilidae
- Genus: Neoitamus
- Species: N. cyanurus

Binomial name
- Neoitamus cyanurus (Loew, 1849)

Synonyms
- Itamus cyanurus Loew, 1849

= Neoitamus cyanurus =

Species of insect

Neoitamus cyanurus, the common awl robberfly, is a carnivorous species of 'robber fly' belonging to the family Asilidae.

== Distribution ==
It is an eastern Palearctic realm species, with a limited distribution in Europe (Austria, Belgium, British Isles, Bulgaria, Czech Republic, Denmark, Finland, France, Germany, Greece, Hungary, Ireland, Italy, North European Russia, Poland, Romania, Slovakia, Sweden, Switzerland, The Netherlands), but it is also present in the Near East and in the Oriental realm.

== Habitat ==
This species mainly inhabits spruce forest edge and hedge rows., but also wooded gardens and parks.

== Identification ==
It is a small, grey-black asilid (10-15 mm.) Difficult to distinguish from other Neoitamus. Wolff, Gebel and Geller-Grimm (2021), ( Majer (1997), van den Broek (1979), Stubbs and Drake (2001) all provide keys, descriptions and illustrations. Older works are also useful Neoitamus cyanurus can reach a body length of about 12–17 millimetres (0.47–0.67 in) and a wing length of about 8–12 millimetres (0.31–0.47 in).

== Biology ==
Adults can be found from May to October, peaking in June and July. It is an ancient woodland species (especially oak). The adult insects perch on tree trunks, or branches waiting for other flying insects, which they then capture with their long bristly legs. Their prey is often larger than the captor. The prey spectrum is broad including, for example, small butterflies, green lacewings (Pseudomallada ventralis), flies, gnats, cicadas, beetles and many more. The larvae develop in the soil and there feed on insect larvae.

== Gallery ==
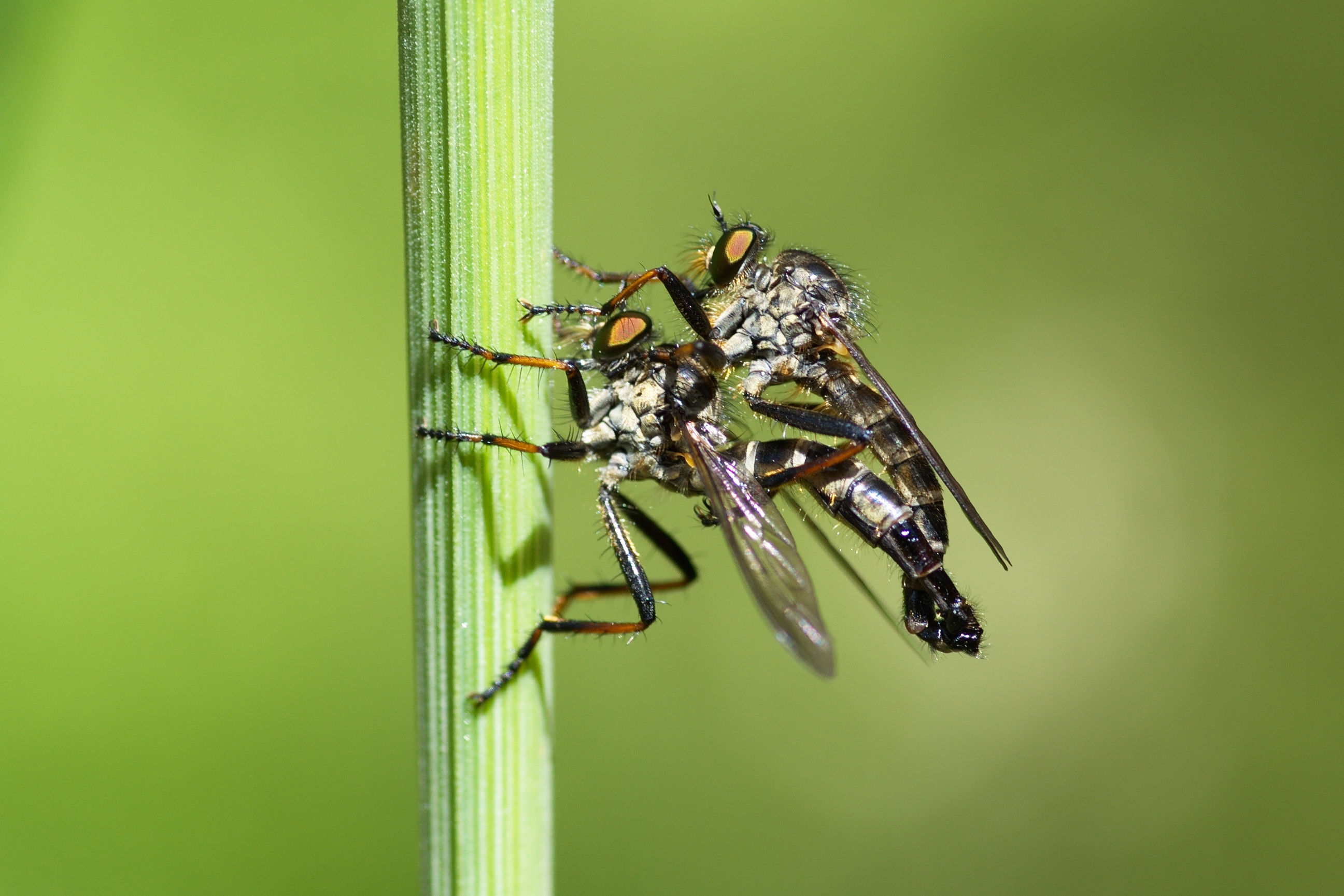
Mating pair

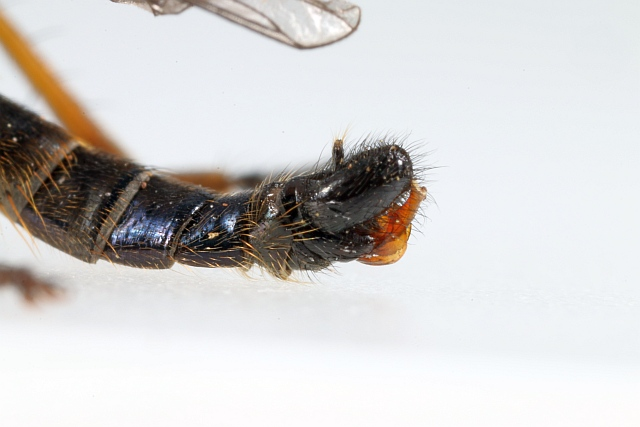
Last segments of the abdomen with male genitalia

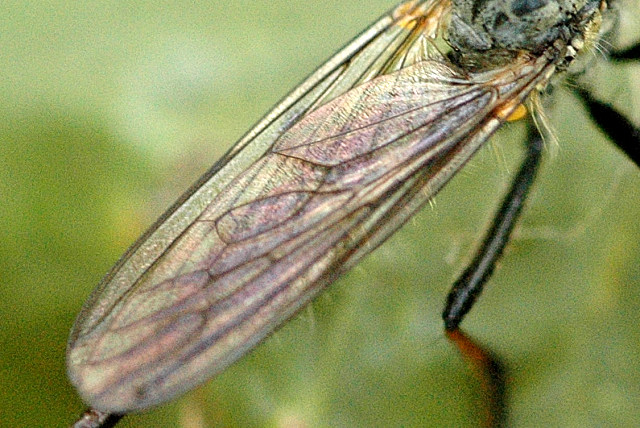
Close-up on wings
