= Beris hauseri =

Scientific classification
- Kingdom: Animalia
- Phylum: Arthropoda
- Class: Insecta
- Order: Diptera
- Family: Stratiomyidae
- Subfamily: Beridinae
- Genus: Beris
- Species: B. hauseri

Binomial name
- Beris hauseri Stuke, 2004

Species of fly

Beris hauseri is a European species of soldier fly.

== Distribution ==
Canada, United States, Austria, Belgium, Czech Republic, Estonia, Finland, Germany, Hungary, Italy, Netherlands, Norway, Poland, Romania, Slovakia, Sweden, Switzerland, Ukraine, Mongolia, Russia.
