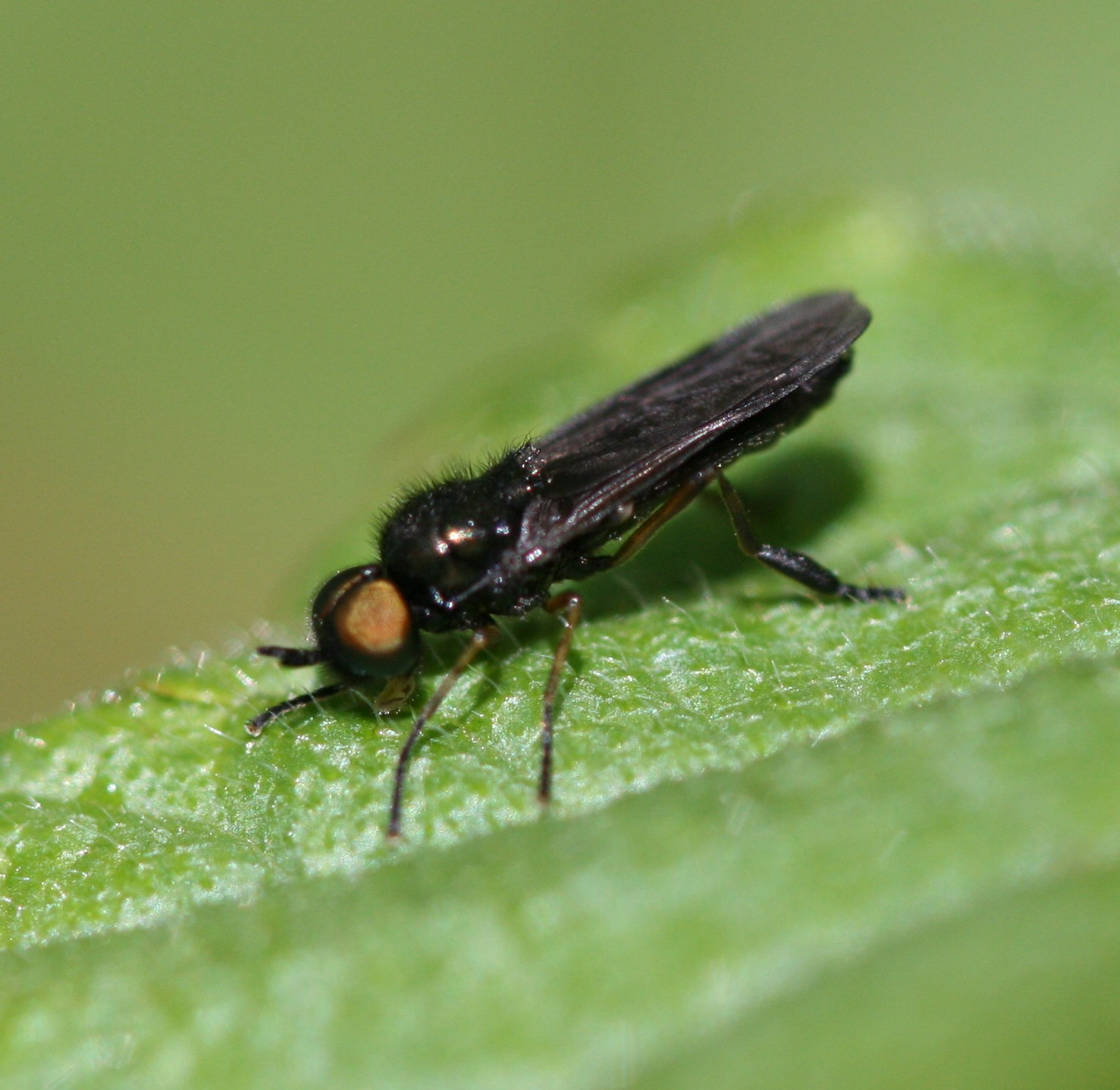
- Beris chalybata

Scientific classification
- Kingdom: Animalia
- Phylum: Arthropoda
- Class: Insecta
- Order: Diptera
- Family: Stratiomyidae
- Subfamily: Beridinae
- Genus: Beris
- Species: B. chalybata

Binomial name
- Beris chalybata (Forster, 1771)

Synonyms
- Beris chalybea (Turton, 1802); Beris chalybeata (Gmelin, 1790); Beris sexdentata (Fabricius, 1781); Musca chalybata Forster, 1771; Musca chalybea Turton, 1802; Musca chalybeata Gmelin, 1790; Stratiomys sexdentata Fabricius, 1781

= Beris chalybata =

Species of fly

Beris chalybata, the murky-legged black legionnaire, is a European (Northern and middle Europe from the northern Sweden down into France. European Russia) species of soldier fly.

== Description ==
Length 5,5—5,8 mm. Male. Eyes hairy, the facets in the upper part slightly larger than below, the dividing line slightly conspicuous. Antennae black, short, shorter than the head: the annulated part short and stubby. Thorax dark metallic green, with blackish brown and longish pubescence. Abdomen dull black with blackish pubescence (long at the margin). Venter brownish black, shining. Legs yellow; coxae brownish black; tarsi, except the bases, brownish black: hind metatarsi yellow, much thickened; the four last joints of the hind tarsi are also slightly dilated. Legs with fine yellowish pubescence. Wings considerably brownish with brownish veins, stigma not conspicuous. Halteres blackish brown.

Female. Fronsin the female broad, occupying the third part of the breadth of the head. Eyes sparingly and short hairy. Front broad, black. Thorax more greenish or bluish than in the male, with short, pale brown pubescence. Abdomen dark brown, shining. Wings not brown but distinctly yellowish, with light brown veins, stigma brown. Halteres yellow.

== Biology ==
The habitat is moist or shaded locations with trees and hedgerows. Adults are found from April to September. The saproxylic larvae found in decaying dead leaves and wood debris.
