= Beris cypria =

Scientific classification
- Kingdom: Animalia
- Phylum: Arthropoda
- Class: Insecta
- Order: Diptera
- Family: Stratiomyidae
- Subfamily: Beridinae
- Genus: Beris
- Species: B. cypria

Binomial name
- Beris cypria James, 1970

Species of fly

Beris cypria is a European species of soldier fly.

== Distribution ==
Cyprus
