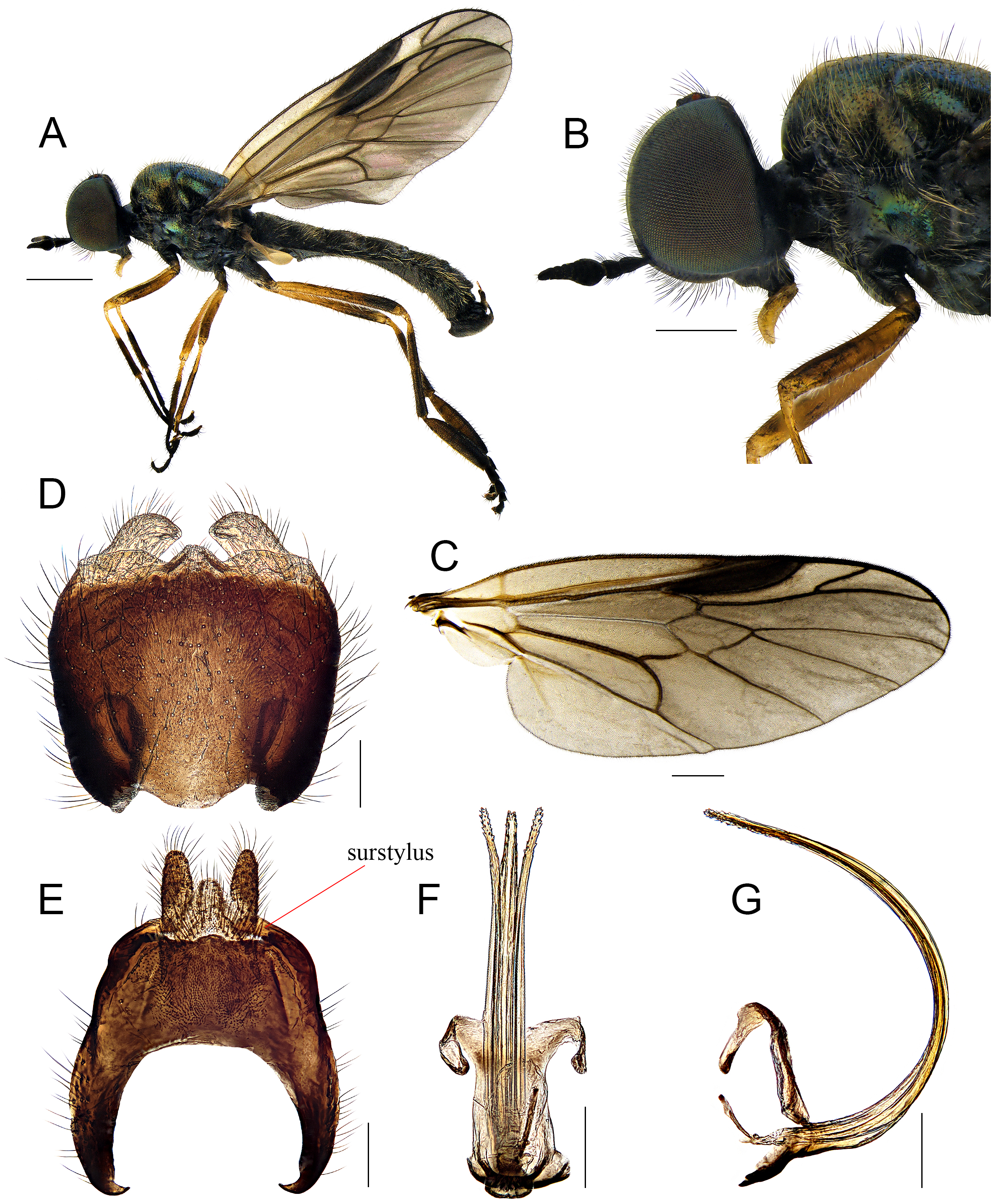

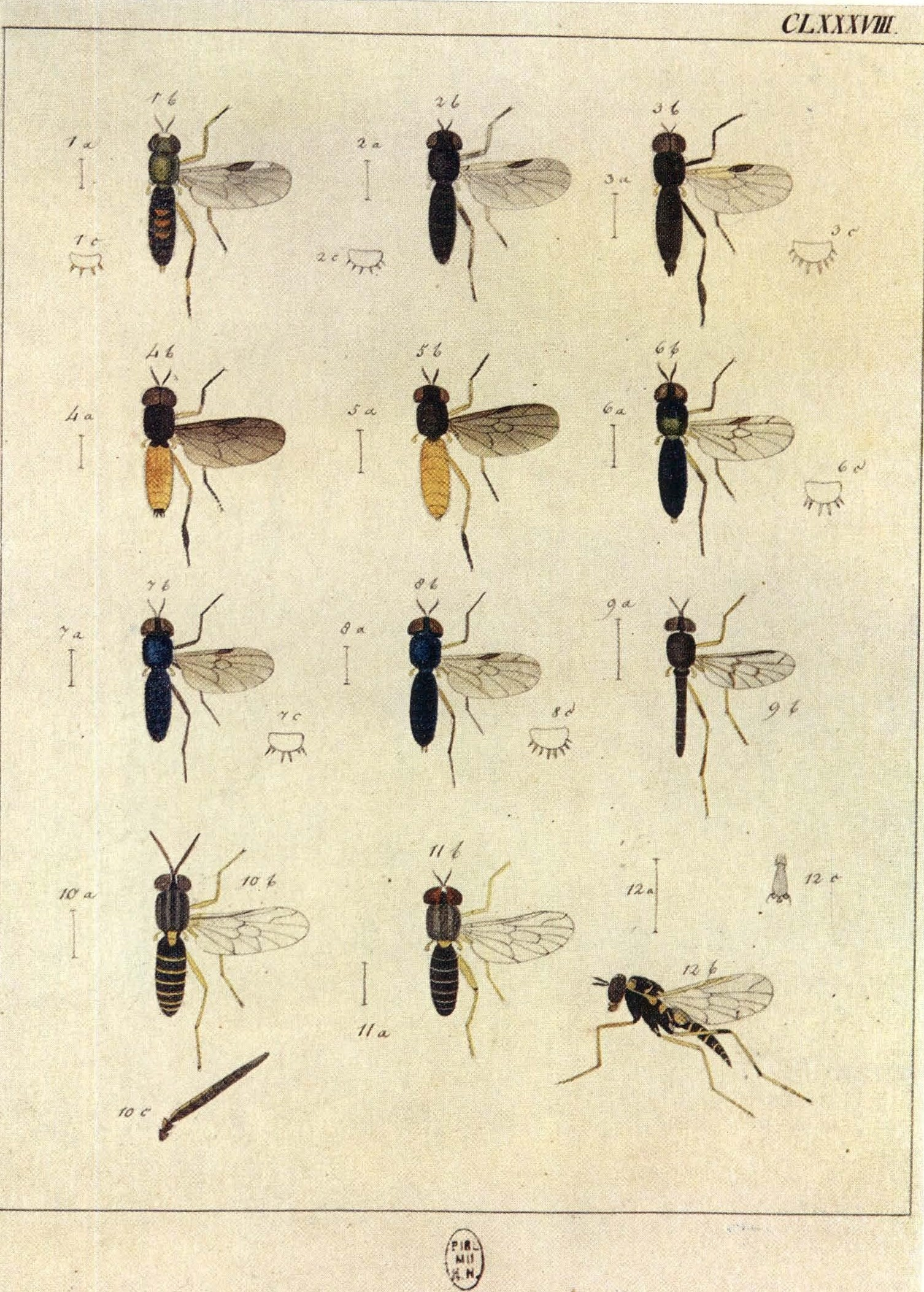
- Beris fuscipes in the 1790 edition of Europäischen Zweiflügeligen (figure 3)

Scientific classification
- Kingdom: Animalia
- Phylum: Arthropoda
- Clade: Pancrustacea
- Class: Insecta
- Order: Diptera
- Family: Stratiomyidae
- Subfamily: Beridinae
- Genus: Beris
- Species: B. fuscipes

Binomial name
- Beris fuscipes Meigen, 1820

Synonyms
- Beris nigra Meigen, 1822

= Beris fuscipes =

Species of fly

Beris fuscipes, the short-horned black legionnaire, is a European species of soldier fly.

== Description ==
Head dark. Antennae short the antennal flagellum thickened basally, as wide as pedicel and narrowed sharply toward apex, almost trapezoidal. Thorax and scutellum bright shining green, not in the least blackish, Abdomen black, legs extensively dark dull orange or dusky. Scutellum with usually six (sometimes eight) spines. Epandrium with developed surstyli. Very similar to Beris geniculata.

== Biology ==
Beris fuscipes occurs in damp woodland, marshes and fens from May-September.

== Distribution ==
Most of Europe including European Russia. North America.
