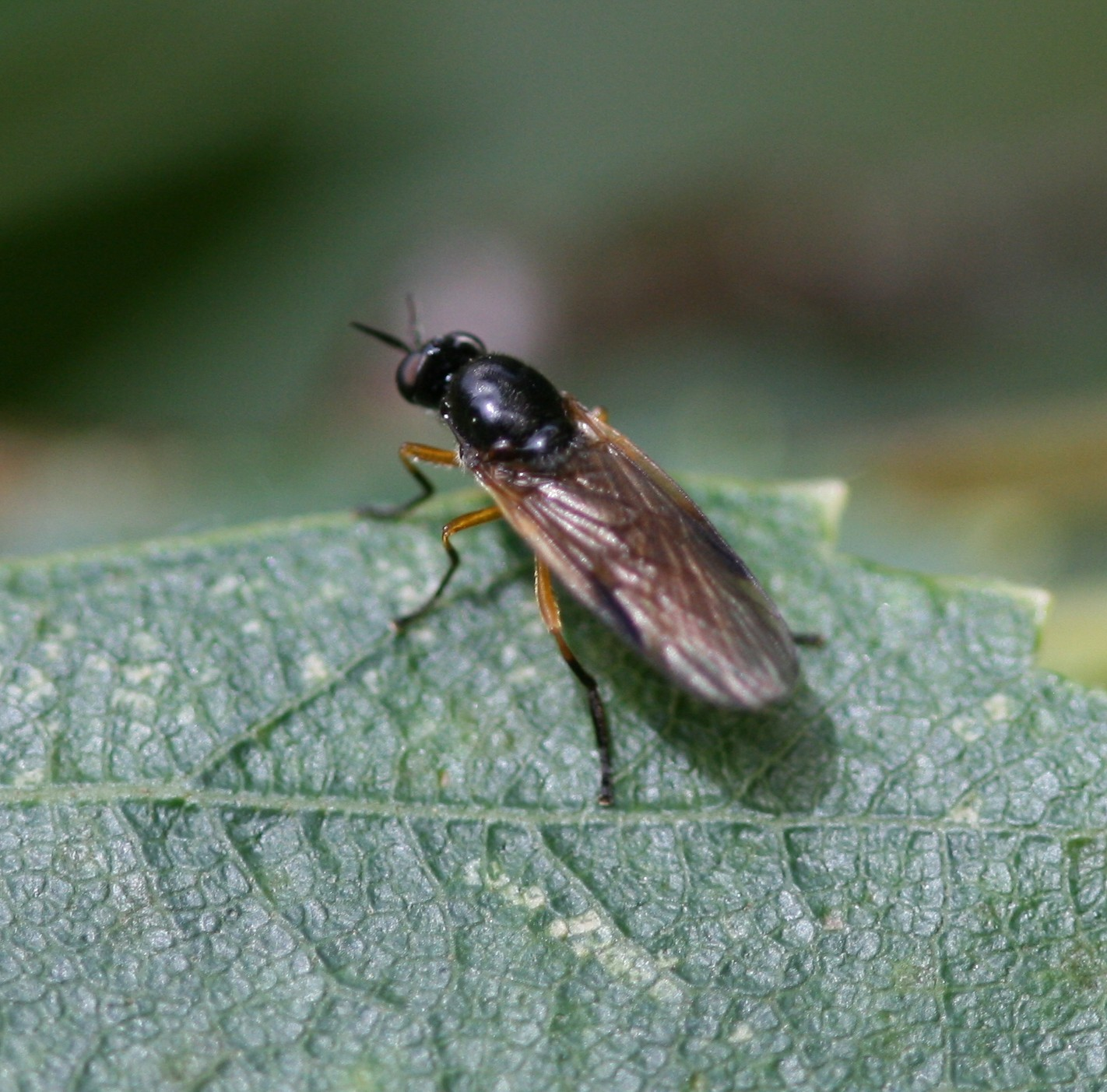
- Beris vallata

Scientific classification
- Kingdom: Animalia
- Phylum: Arthropoda
- Clade: Pancrustacea
- Class: Insecta
- Order: Diptera
- Family: Stratiomyidae
- Subfamily: Beridinae
- Genus: Beris; Latreille, 1802

Type species
- Musca chalybata Forster, 1771

Synonyms
- Hexacantha Meigen, 1803; Hexacantha Lioy, 1864; Octacantha Lioy, 1864; Hemiberis Enderlein, 1921

= Beris =

Genus of flies

Beris is a genus of flies in the family Stratiomyidae. They are also referred to as the false soldier fly. As described by Latreille in 1802, these are small to medium sized flies with metallic colors.

== Description ==
These are flies with elongated bodies and reduced palpi. The scutellum typically features spines and the abdomen has seven visible segments. They are characterized as having black or metallic green thorax, black or orange abdomen and darkened wings in some species.

== Habitat and behavior ==
Soldier flies are primarily found in tropical regions but are widespread globally. The larvae are scavengers, inhabiting decaying organic matter, wet moss, compost, and aquatic environments. Adults are typically found near larval habitats, frequenting flowers and forming swarms. These swarms are normally observed around foliage near mountain valleys, marshes, and damp places.

== Morphology ==
Bright, metallic colored species sometimes resemble wasps or bees. The wing venation is a strongly specific characteristic of the family, with interior veins and a small discal cell in the anterior half of the wing. The antennae show structural variations, and the scutellum is equipped with spines.

The larval body is flat with a strongly sclerotized head capsule, three thoracic and about 8 abdominal body segments. The cuticle has a honeycomb-like appearance due to calcium carbonate secretions. The mandibles and maxillae are fused together, forming two distinct mandibular-maxillary complexes. These complexed move alternately in a vertical plain. Terrestrial larvae are elongated and oval with a rounded abdominal end, while aquatic or semi-aquatic larvae have a tapering posterior end with a crown of hydrofuge hair.

The larvae are not predatory or parasitic. They feed on detritus, while their specialized mouthparts serve as sweeping apparatus. Aquatic larvae feed on decaying leaves, micro-organisms and detritus, while the Oxycera larvae feed on algae on moist rocks. Some adults are nectar feeders, indicated by an elongated proboscis and narrow labella, however, most of the species have a relatively short proboscis with a large fleshy labella which consume pollen grains and honeydew.

In general, male flies in the genus Beris tend to be slightly smaller in size compared to females. Their eyes are contiguous in the male. The coloration of the body and wings can vary between species and exhibit sexual dimorphism

== Life cycle ==
In temperate regions, the life cycle is annual. The larvae may hibernate several times. The eggs are usually pale yellow and elongated. The female is capable of laying 600 or more eggs per batch. Pupation takes place within the final larval skin, or puparium. The pupa is much smaller than puparium since the remaining space is filled with air to allow floatation upon the water's surface.

== Species ==
- Beris alamaculata Yang & Nagatomi, 1992
- Beris ancistra Cui, Li & Yang, 2010
- Beris annulifera var. luteipes Johnson, 1926
- Beris annulipes Brunetti, 1912
- Beris basiflava Yang & Nagatomi, 1992
- Beris burmanica Frey, 1960
- Beris chalybata (Forster, 1771)
- Beris clavipes (Linnaeus, 1767)
- Beris concava Li, Zhang & Yang, 2009
- Beris cypria James, 1970
- Beris digitata Li, Zhang & Yang, 2009
- Beris dolichocera Frey, 1960
- Beris emeishana Yang & Nagatomi, 1992
- Beris excellens Frey, 1960
- Beris flava Li, Zhang & Yang, 2011
- Beris furcata Cui, Li & Yang, 2010
- Beris fuscipes Meigen, 1820
- Beris gansuensis Yang & Nagatomi, 1992
- Beris geniculata Curtis, 1830
- Beris hauseri Stuke, 2004
- Beris heptapotamica Pleske, 1926
- Beris hildebrandtae Pleske, 1930
- Beris hirotui Ôuchi, 1943
- Beris huanglianshana Li, Zhang & Yang, 2009
- Beris kovalevi Rozkošný & Nartshuk, 1980
- Beris latifacies Nagatomi & Tanaka, 1972
- Beris luteistigma Frey, 1960
- Beris malaisei Frey, 1960
- Beris miocenica James, 1937
- Beris morrisii Dale, 1841
- Beris nebulosa Nagatomi & Tanaka, 1972
- Beris potanini Pleske, 1926
- Beris pulchripennis Frey, 1960
- Beris rozkosnyi Kassebeer, 1996
- Beris schaposchnikowi Pleske, 1926
- Beris shennongana Li, Luo & Yang, 2009
- Beris spinosa Li, Zhang & Yang, 2009
- Beris strobli Dušek & Rozkošný, 1968
- Beris trilobata Li, Zhang & Yang, 2009
- Beris vallata (Forster, 1771)
- Beris yangxiana Cui, Li & Yang, 2010
- Beris zhouae Qi, Zhang & Yang, 2011
- Beris zhouquensis Li, Zhang & Yang, 2011
- Beris ziminae Rozkošný & Nartshuk, 1980
