= Beris strobli =

Scientific classification
- Kingdom: Animalia
- Phylum: Arthropoda
- Class: Insecta
- Order: Diptera
- Family: Stratiomyidae
- Subfamily: Beridinae
- Genus: Beris
- Species: B. strobli

Binomial name
- Beris strobli Dusek & Rozkosny, 1968

Synonyms
- Beris chalybeata var. obscura Strobl, 1909

Species of fly

Beris strobli is a European species of soldier fly.

== Distribution ==
Austria, Czech Republic, Germany, Hungary, Switzerland.
