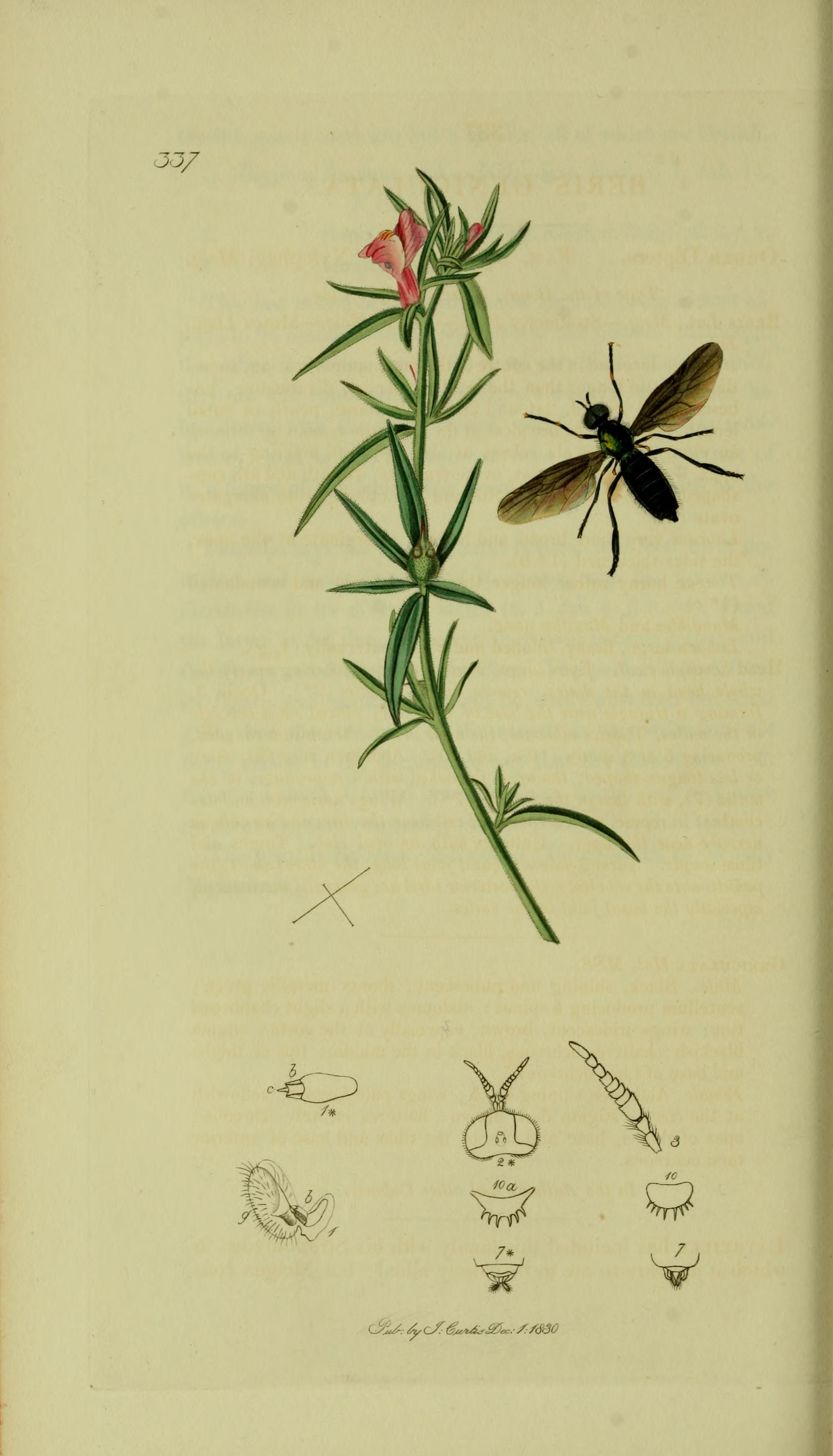
- British Entomology illustration

Scientific classification
- Kingdom: Animalia
- Phylum: Arthropoda
- Clade: Pancrustacea
- Class: Insecta
- Order: Diptera
- Family: Stratiomyidae
- Subfamily: Beridinae
- Genus: Beris
- Species: B. geniculata

Binomial name
- Beris geniculata Curtis, 1830

Synonyms
- Beris grandis Gravenhorst, 1832

= Beris geniculata =

Species of fly

Beris geniculata, the long-horned black legionnaire, is a European species of soldier fly.

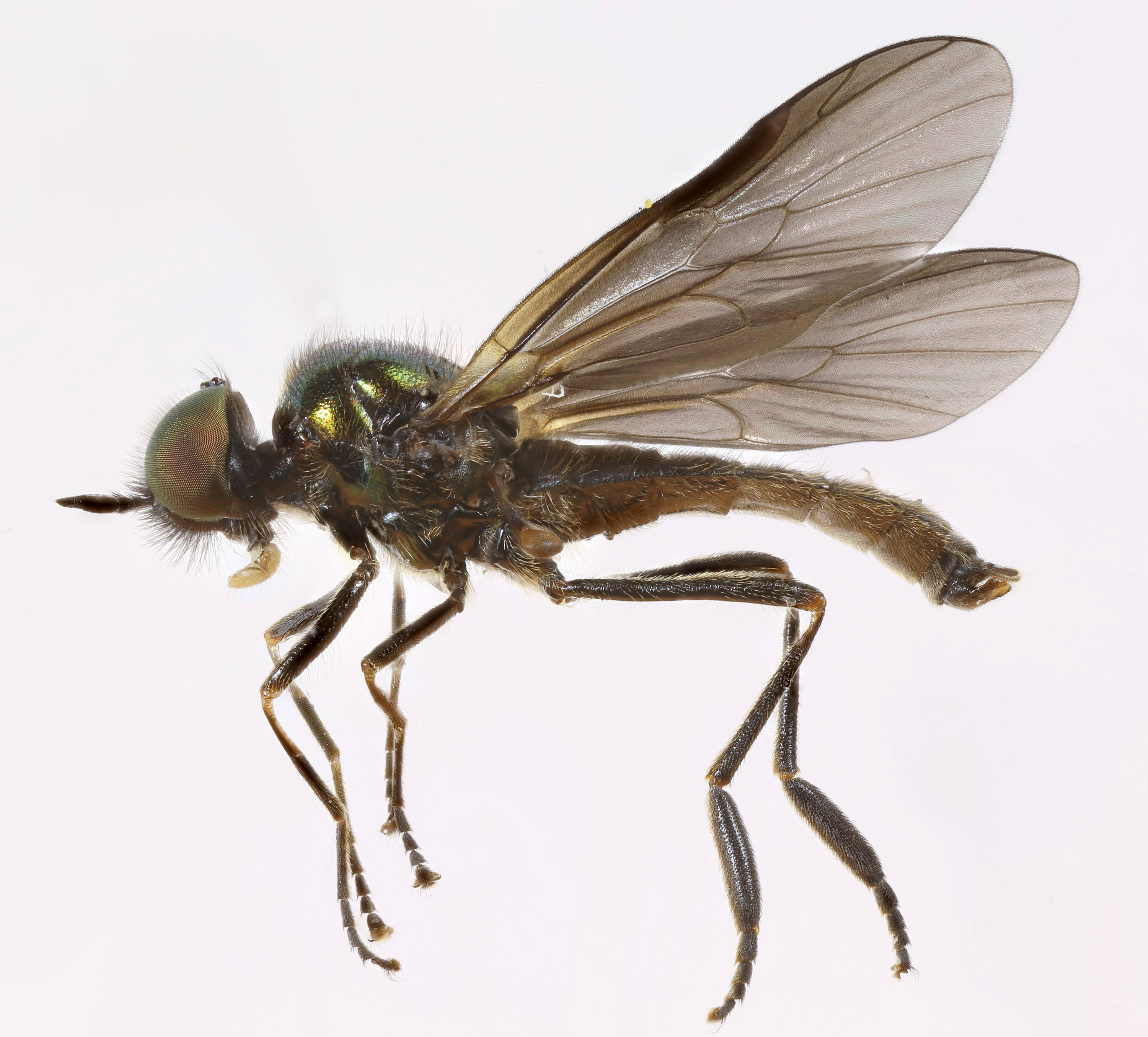
Beris geniculata North Wales

== Description ==
Antennae long and placed in the middle of the head or just below.3rd segment of antennae long in female;in male almost two times as long as basal segments together. Thorax metallic green with black pubescence and blue reflections more apparent on the scutellum. Legs black with the knees orange; basal joint of the hind tarsi in the male moderately and equally dilated, longer, than the other four joints together. Wings of both male and female blackish. Abdomen deep dull black, slightly shining on the sides and about the tip. Epandrium with surstyli. Very similar to Beris fuscipes.

== Biology ==
The Flight period is mid May to early September.Beris geniculata is found in damp woodland and riverside habitats, where Angelica sylvestris grows

== Distribution ==
Ireland through North and Central Europe to the East Palaearctic.
