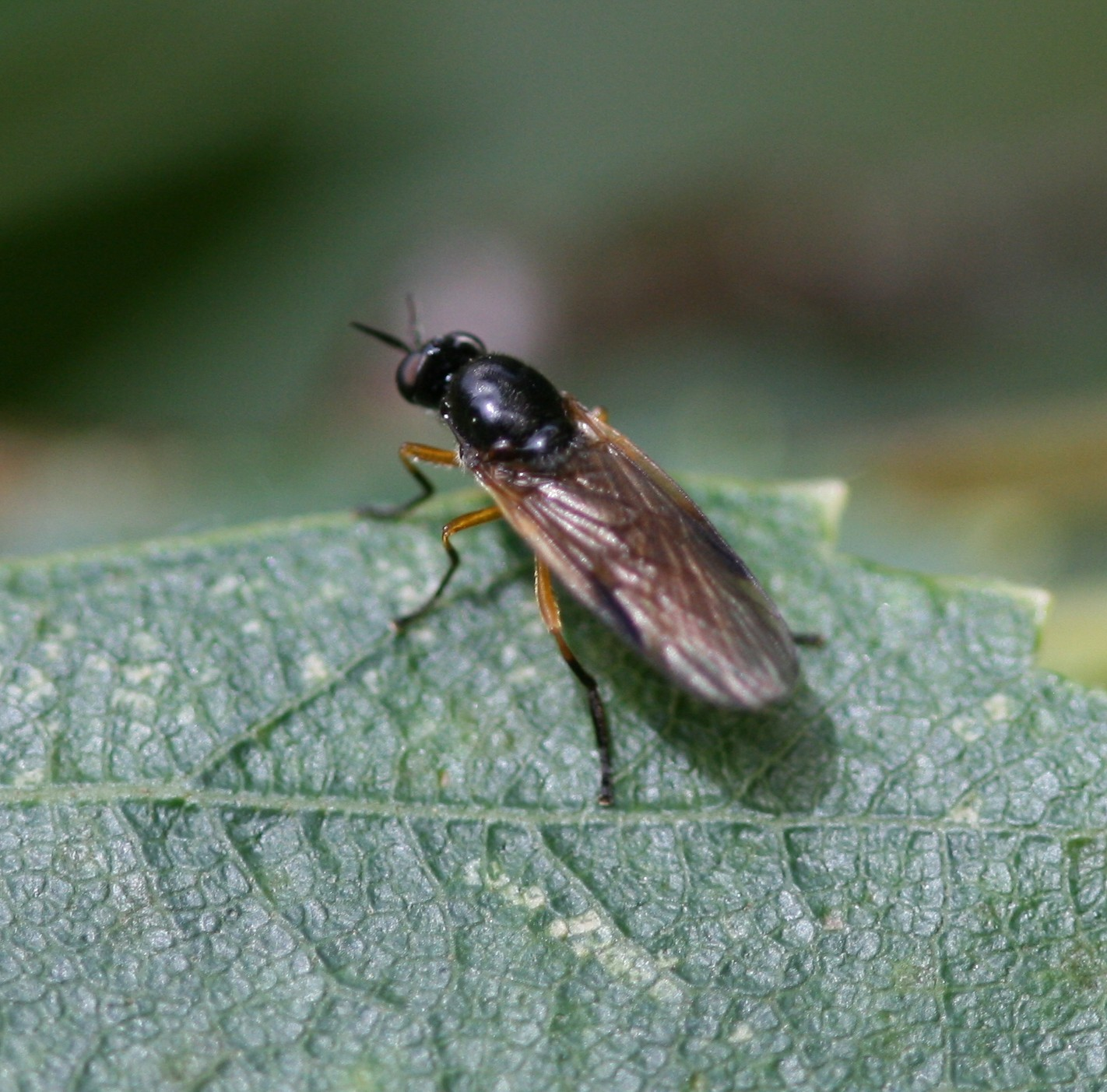
- Beris vallata

Scientific classification
- Kingdom: Animalia
- Phylum: Arthropoda
- Class: Insecta
- Order: Diptera
- Family: Stratiomyidae
- Subfamily: Beridinae
- Genus: Beris
- Species: B. vallata

Binomial name
- Beris vallata (Forster, 1771)

Synonyms
- Musca vallata Forster, 1771

= Beris vallata =

Species of fly

Beris vallata, the orange legionnaire or common orange legionnaire, is a European species of soldier fly.

== Description ==
Beris vallata is a soldier fly, which is black and yellow in colour. The abdomen is entirely yellow, lacking black bands. All tibiae are yellow and then black in the apical half. Wings of the female are yellowish with brown pterostigma, while wings of the male are blackish in colour. Pubescence of the abdomen is black for males and yellow in females. Body length ranges from 5 to 6 mm. The species also possesses six spines which protrude from the back of the scutellum.

== Lifecycle ==
The flight period is from may to September. Larvae inhabit moist Bryophyta, where they feed on decaying vegetation. Pupation will take place among fallen decomposing leaves. Adults feed on pollen and nectar including that of Tanacetum vulgare.

== Habitat ==
Beris vallata is associated with marsh and wet woodland habitats in areas that provide moist conditions for mosses. Larvae can often be found living within mosses in close proximity to bodies of water. Adults are found on vegetation, also in close proximity to moist habitat.

== Distribution ==
North Europe, Central Europe, Southwest Europe, north up to Sweden and European Russia.
