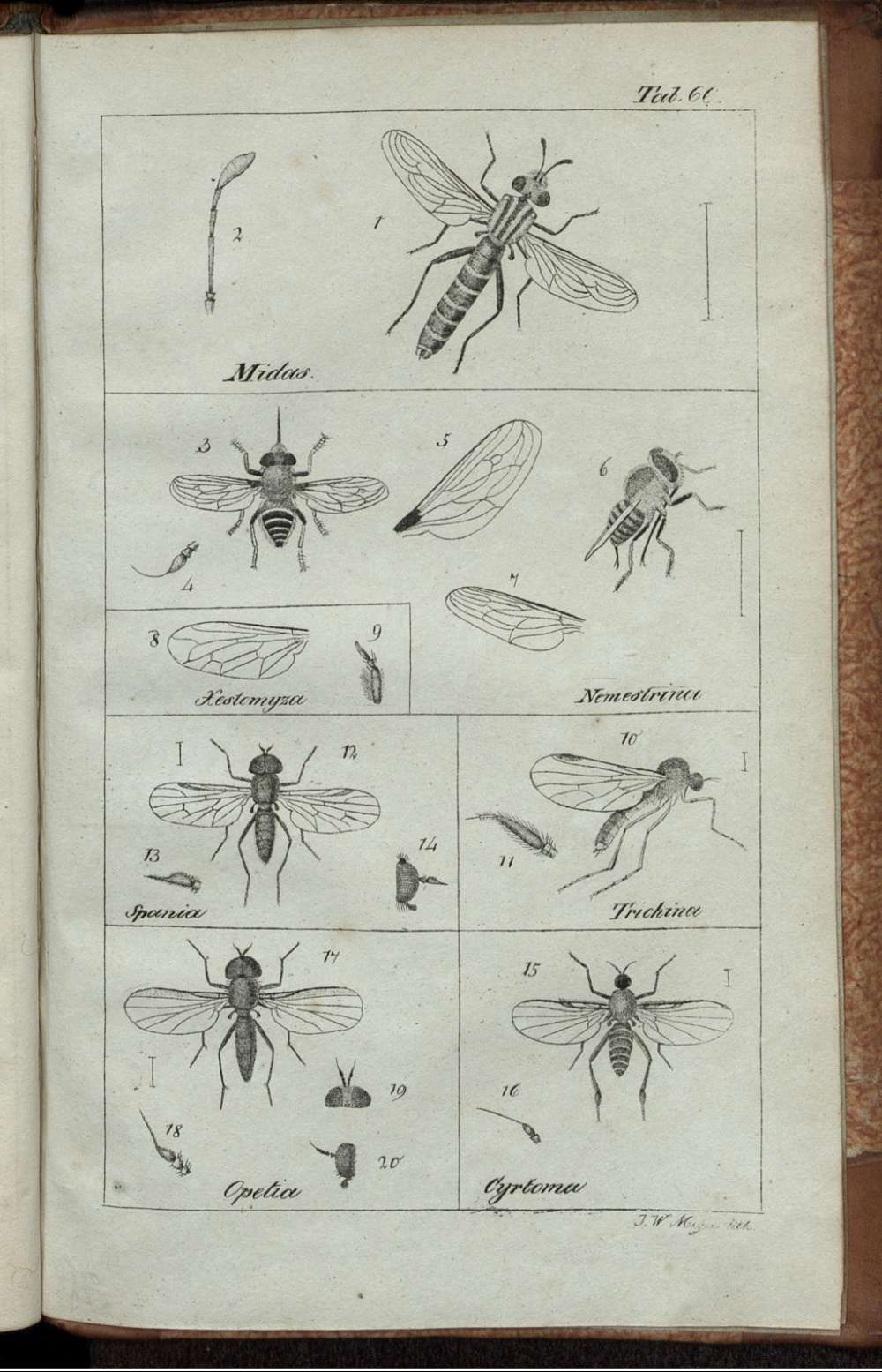
- Spania nigrain Meigen

Scientific classification
- Kingdom: Animalia
- Phylum: Arthropoda
- Clade: Pancrustacea
- Class: Insecta
- Order: Diptera
- Family: Rhagionidae
- Subfamily: Spaniinae
- Genus: Spania
- Species: S. nigra

Binomial name
- Spania nigra Meigen, 1830

= Spania nigra =

Species of fly

Spania nigra, is a species of 'snipe flies' belonging to the family Rhagionidae.

It is a Palearctic species with a limited distribution in Europe

== Description ==
Tiny black flies without a true style, but the ventral margin of the last antennal segment is produced into a pseudostyle. Vein M3 usually does not reach the wing-margin. Metapleura bare.

== Biology ==
The larvae are thallus-miners of thallose liverworts.
