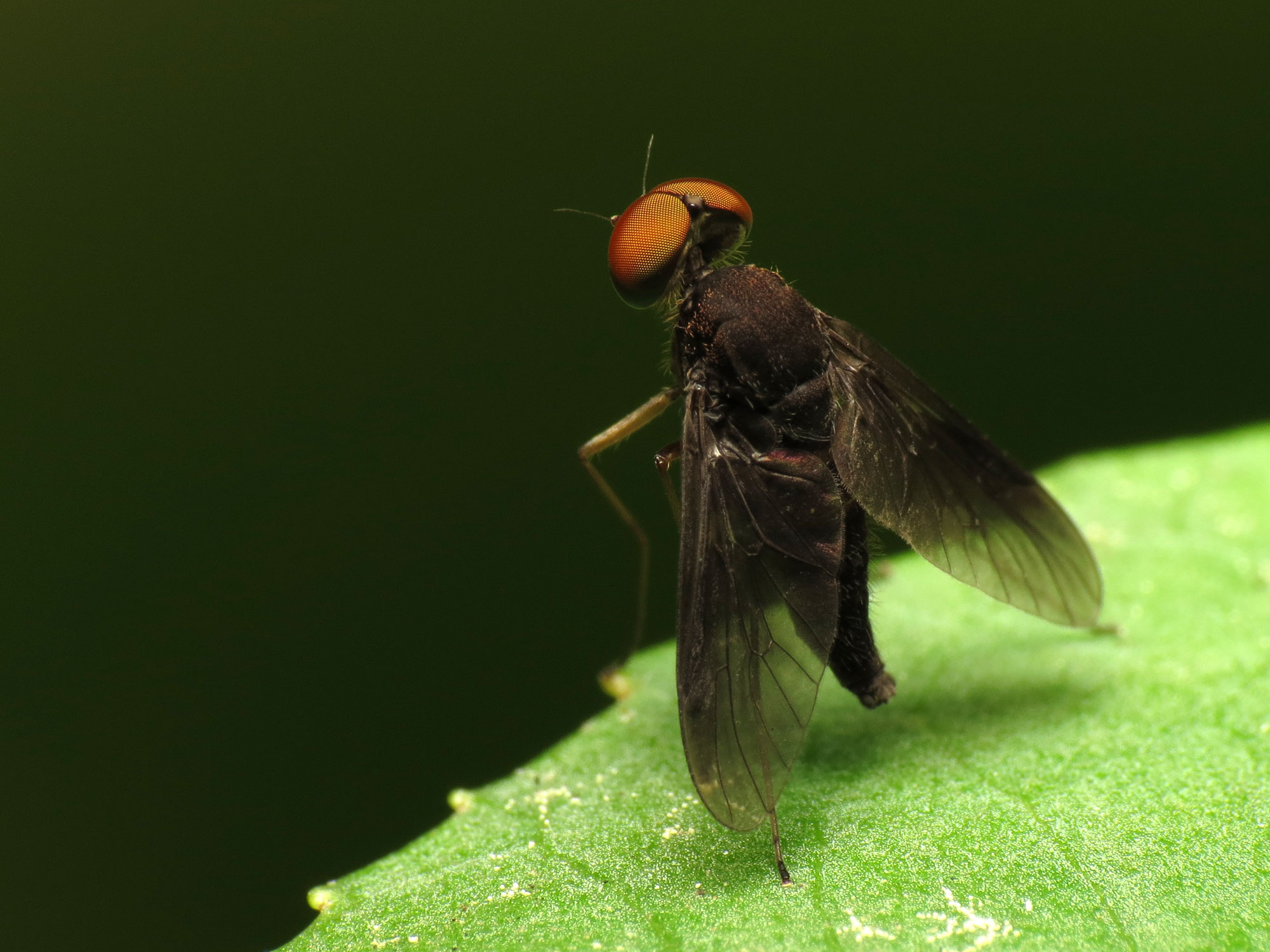

Scientific classification
- Kingdom: Animalia
- Phylum: Arthropoda
- Class: Insecta
- Order: Diptera
- Family: Rhagionidae
- Subfamily: Chrysopilinae
- Genus: Chrysopilus
- Species: C. quadratus

Binomial name
- Chrysopilus quadratus (Say, 1823)

Synonyms
- Chrysopilus dispar Wulp, 1867; Chrysopilus flavidus Bigot, 1887; Leptipalpus limbipennis Bigot, 1887; Leptipalpus obscuripennis Bigot, 1887; Leptis fumipennis Say, 1823; Leptis quadratus Say, 1823; Leptis reflexa Walker, 1848

= Chrysopilus quadratus =

Species of fly

Chrysopilus quadratus is a species of snipe fly in the family Rhagionidae.

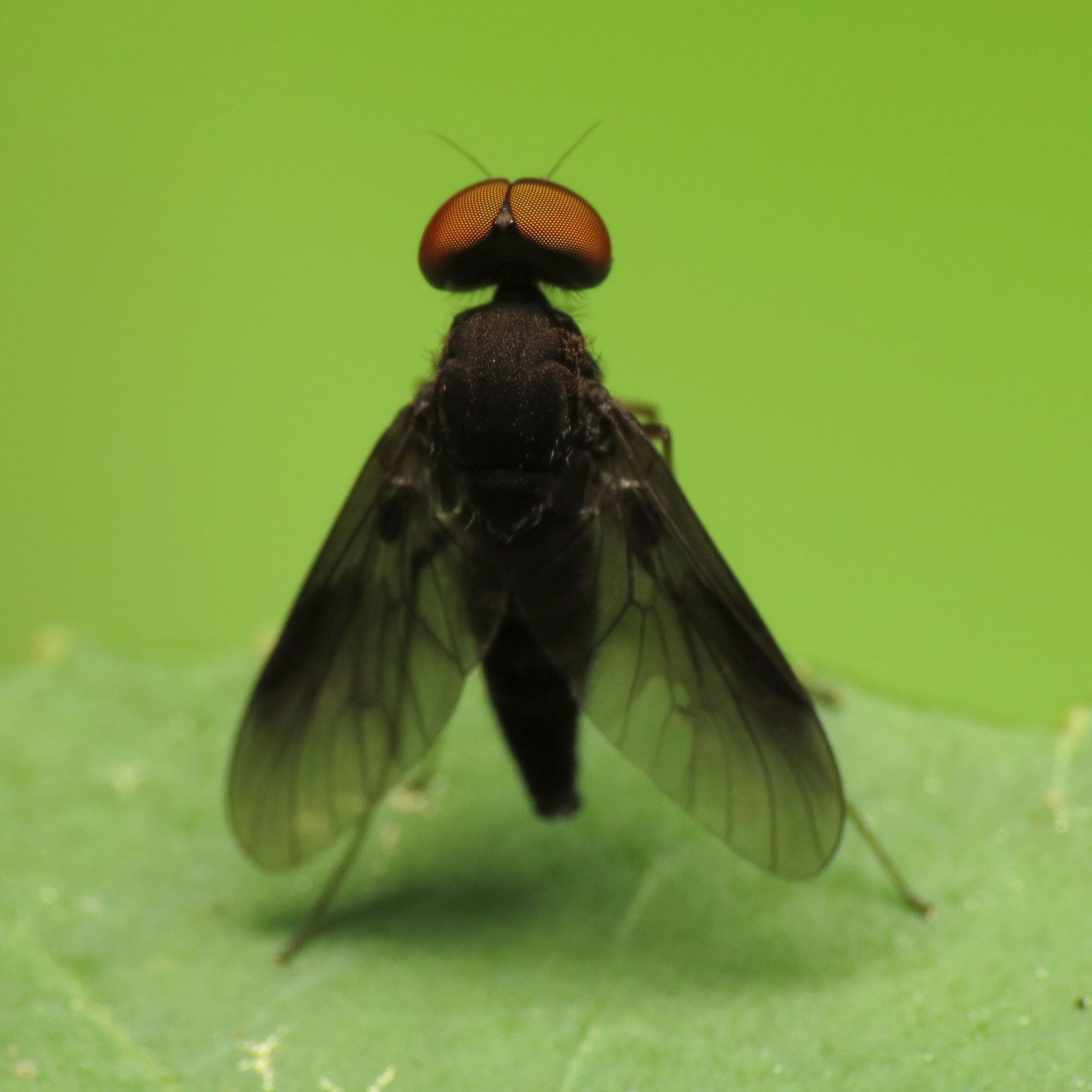

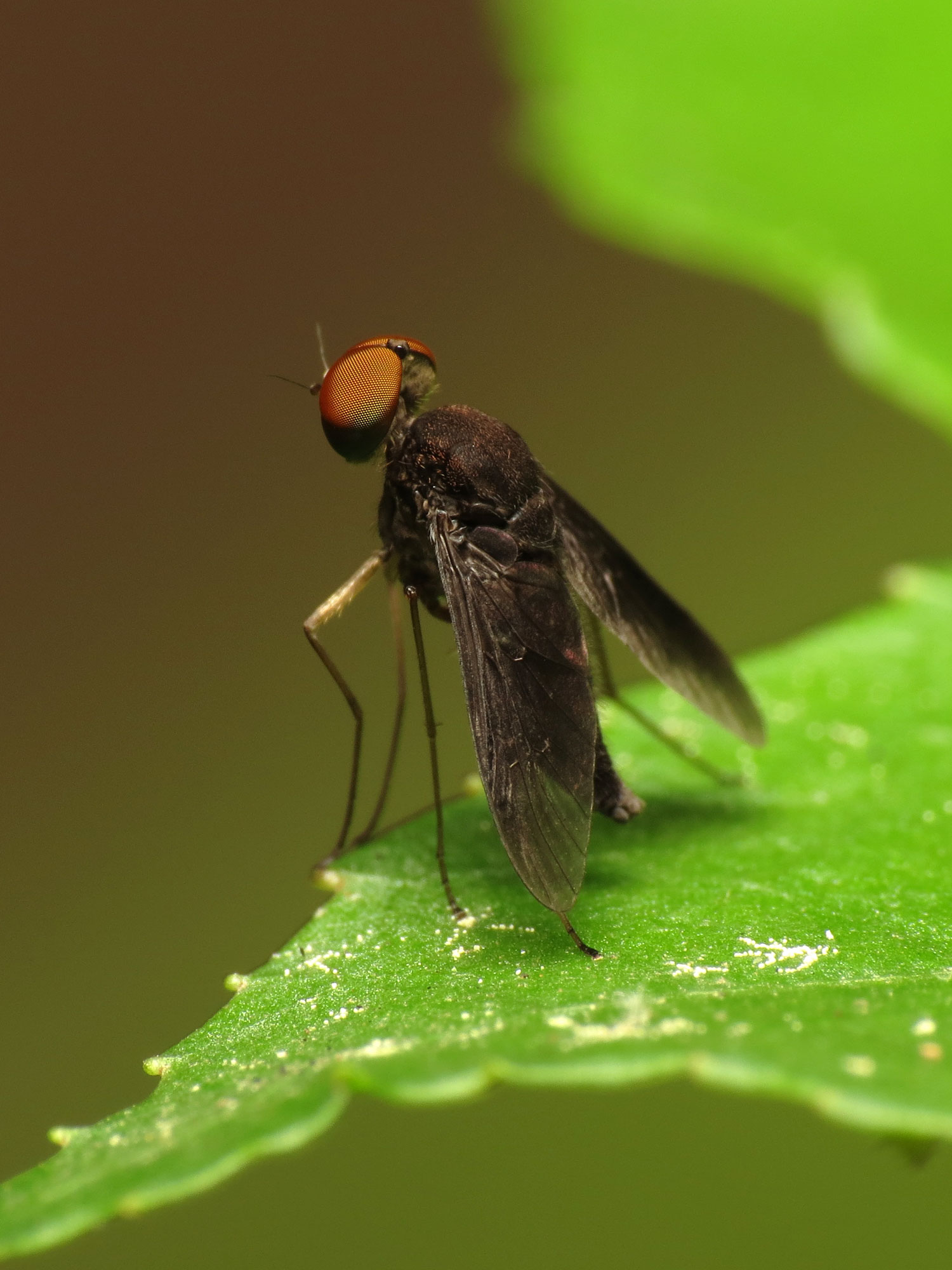

== Distribution ==
Canada, United States
