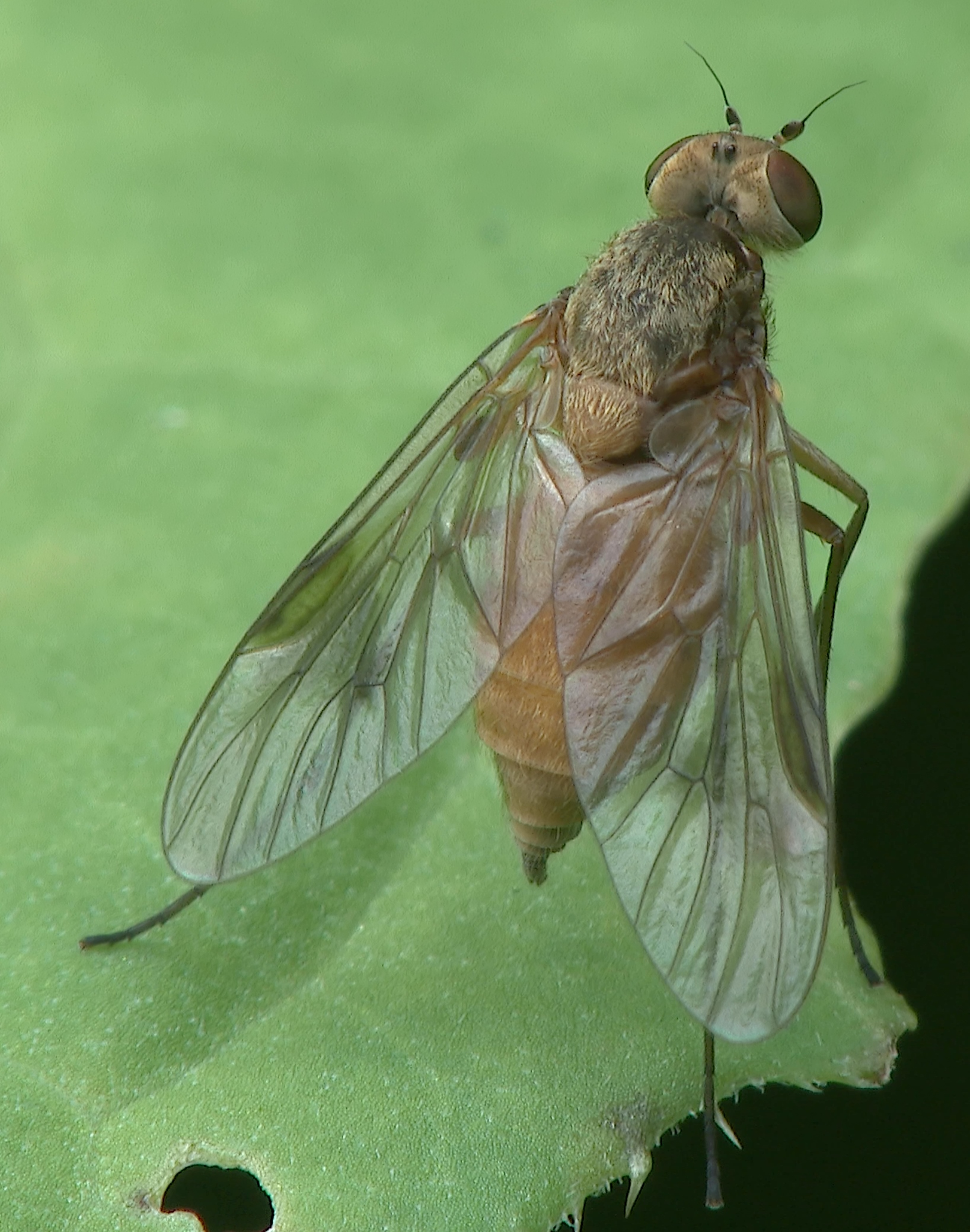
- Chrysopilus laetus Patscherkofels, Tirol

Scientific classification
- Kingdom: Animalia
- Phylum: Arthropoda
- Clade: Pancrustacea
- Class: Insecta
- Order: Diptera
- Family: Rhagionidae
- Subfamily: Chrysopilinae
- Genus: Chrysopilus
- Species: C. laetus

Binomial name
- Chrysopilus laetus Zetterstedt, 1842

= Chrysopilus laetus =

Species of fly

Chrysopilus laetus is a Palearctic species of snipe fly in the family Rhagionidae.

The wings have a distinct, if interrupted, dark band extending from the stigma across the radial fork and tip of discal cell and a second spot near apex of Cu1. The body is mainly yellow.The first two antenna segments are orange.
