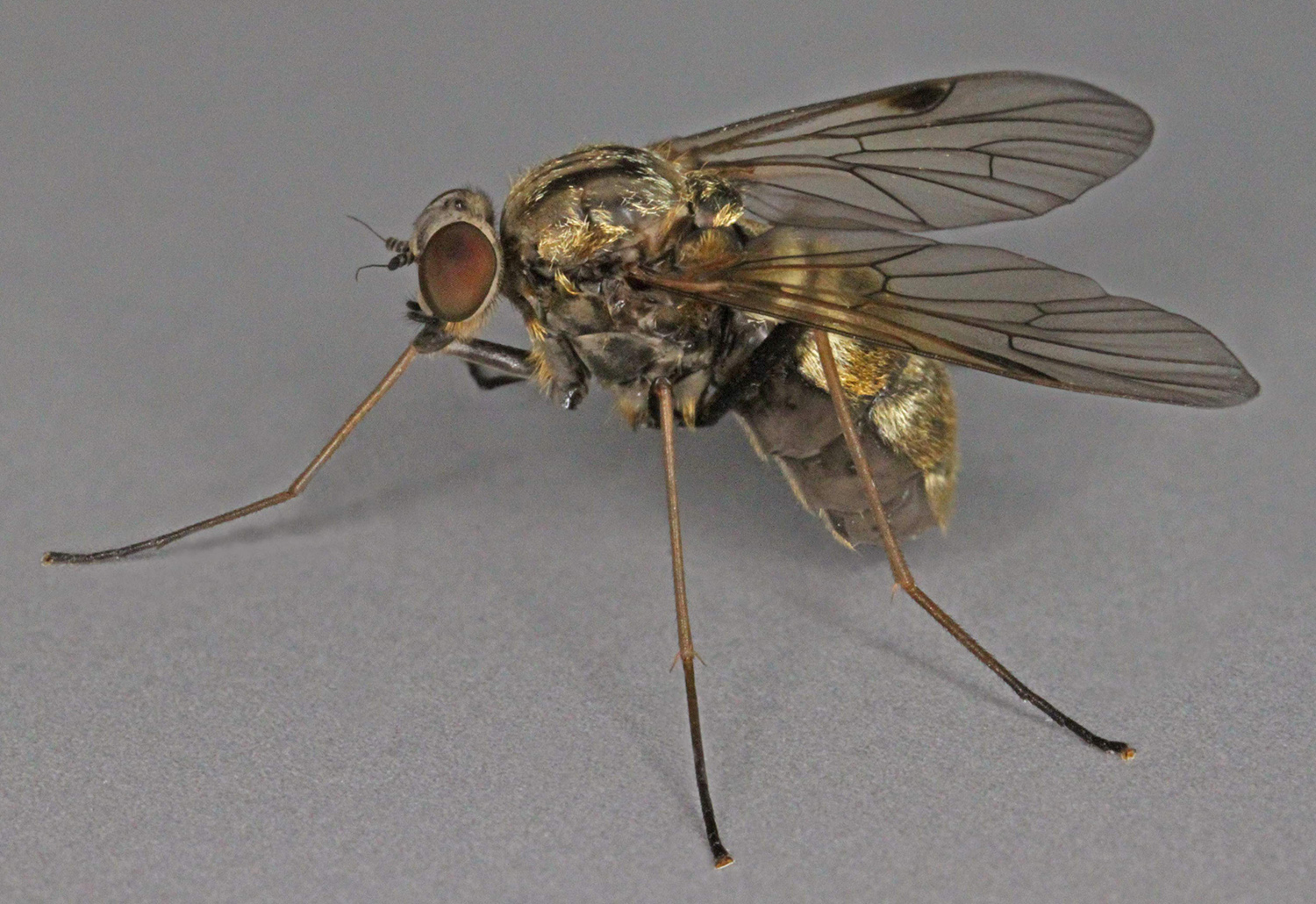

Scientific classification
- Kingdom: Animalia
- Phylum: Arthropoda
- Clade: Pancrustacea
- Class: Insecta
- Order: Diptera
- Family: Rhagionidae
- Subfamily: Chrysopilinae
- Genus: Chrysopilus
- Species: C. cristatus

Binomial name
- Chrysopilus cristatus (Fabricius 1775)

Synonyms
- Musca cristata Fabricius, 1775; Atherix aurata Fabricius, 1805; Musca cingulata Donovan, 1808; Sylvicola solitaneus Harris, 1779

= Chrysopilus cristatus =

Species of fly

Chrysopilus cristatus, is a species of 'snipe flies' belonging to the family Rhagionidae.

Chrysopilus cristatus, Male on Rumex (Video, 2m 15s)

This species is present in most of Europe.

The flies are 6 to 8 millimeters long. Similar to Chrysopilus erythrophthalmus, but slightly smaller than this species. The males are blackish-brown: the females have obvious yellow-grey dusting. The femora are dark grey. The tibia and metatarsus are yellow.
