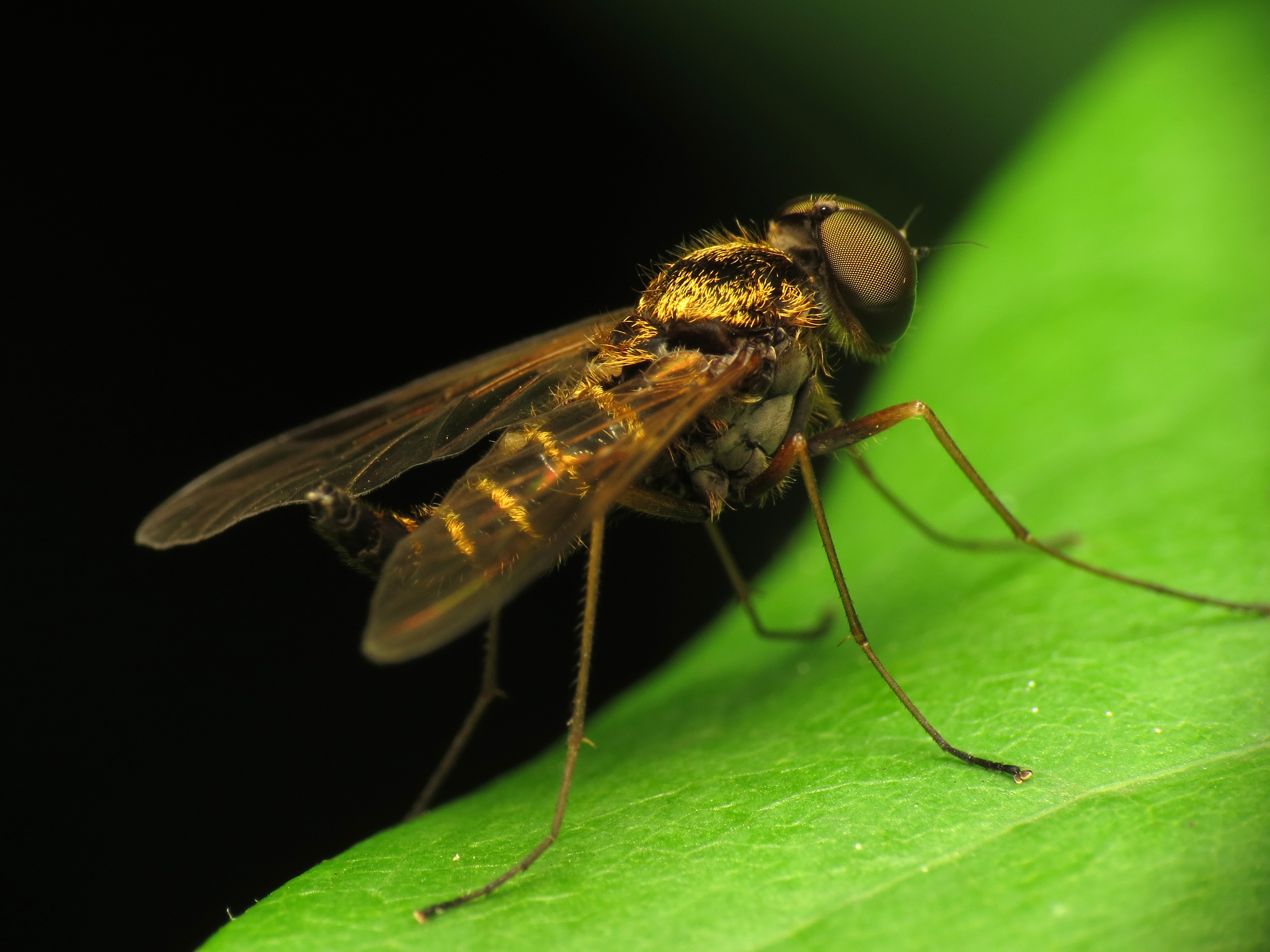

Scientific classification
- Kingdom: Animalia
- Phylum: Arthropoda
- Clade: Pancrustacea
- Class: Insecta
- Order: Diptera
- Family: Rhagionidae
- Subfamily: Chrysopilinae
- Genus: Chrysopilus
- Species: C. fasciatus

Binomial name
- Chrysopilus fasciatus (Say, 1823)

Synonyms
- Leptis fasciatus Say, 1823; Leptis par Walker, 1848

= Chrysopilus fasciatus =

Species of fly

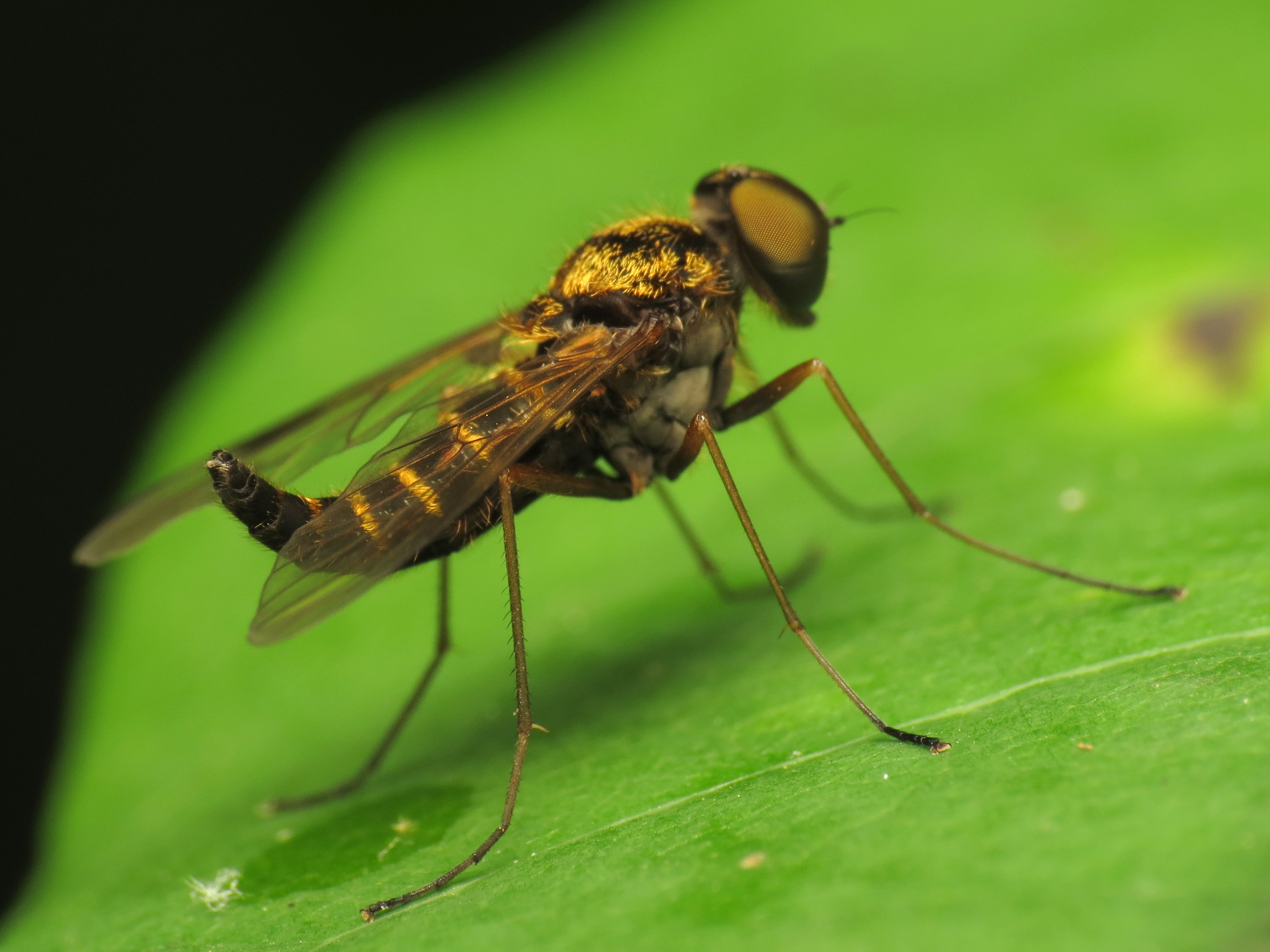

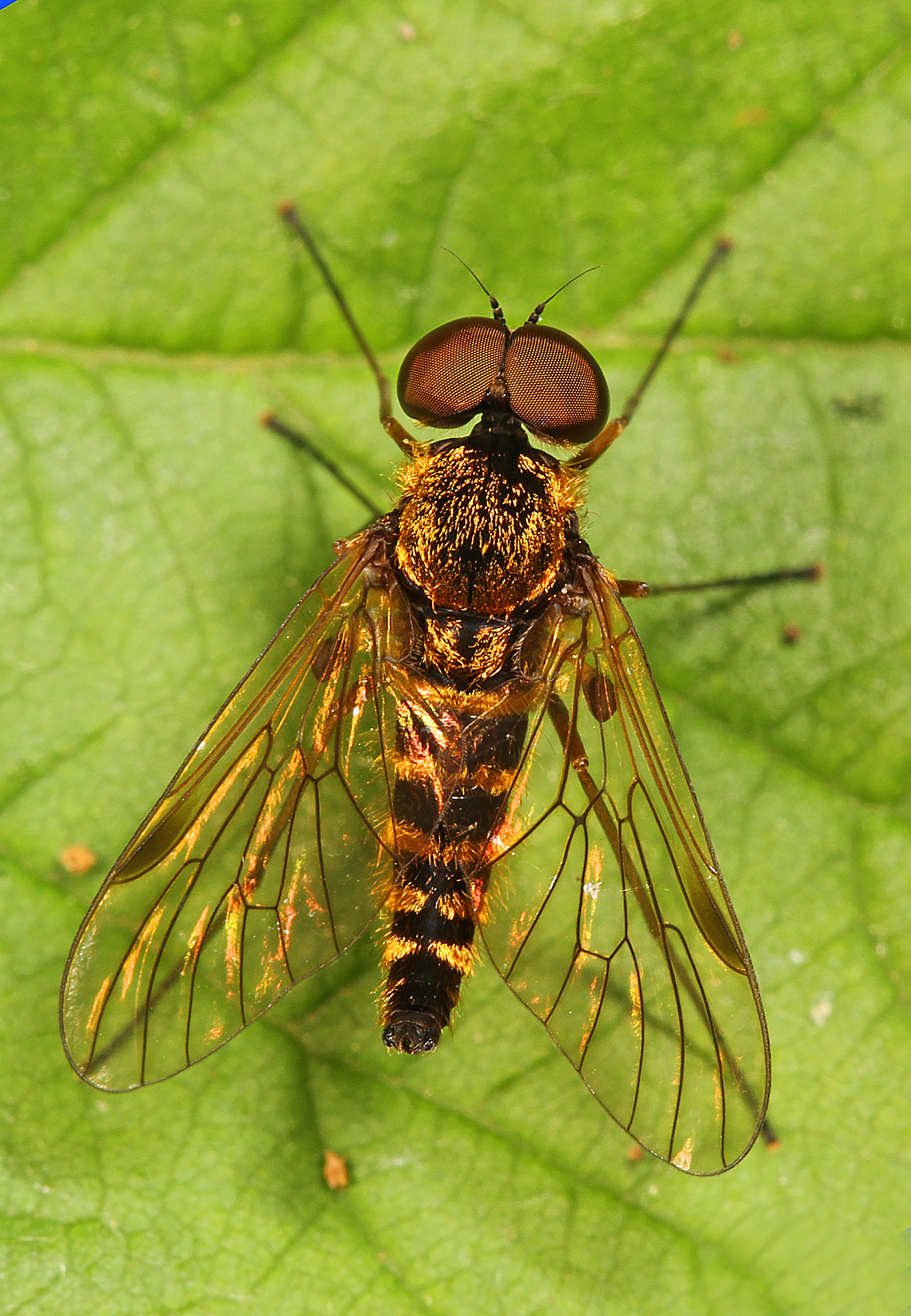

Chrysopilus fasciatus is a species of snipe fly in the family Rhagionidae.

== Distribution ==
United States
