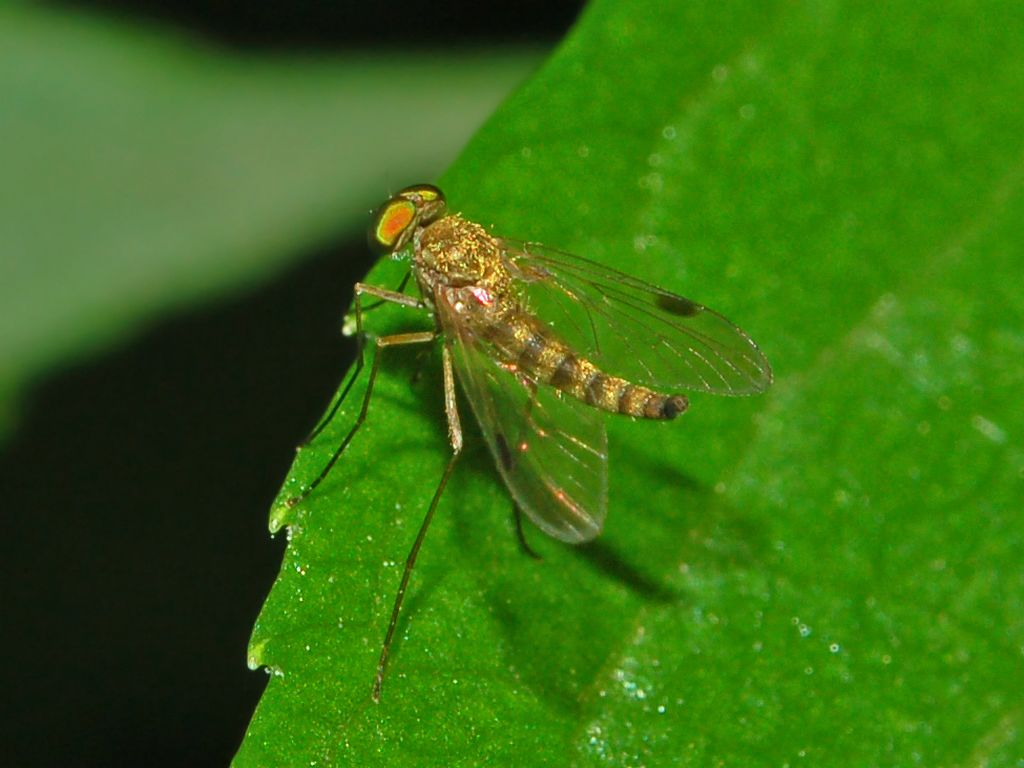
- Chrysopilus cf. asiliformis, male

Scientific classification
- Kingdom: Animalia
- Phylum: Arthropoda
- Class: Insecta
- Order: Diptera
- Family: Rhagionidae
- Genus: Chrysopilus
- Species: C. asiliformis

Binomial name
- Chrysopilus asiliformis (Preyssler, 1791)

Synonyms
- Chrysopilus aureus (Meigen, 1804); Chrysopilus meridionalis Bezzi, 1898; Musca asiliformis Preyssler, 1791; Rhagio aureus Meigen, 1804; Rhagio aurulans Meigen, 1820; Rhagio luridus Meigen, 1820

= Chrysopilus asiliformis =

Species of fly

Chrysopilus asiliformis, the little snipe fly, is a species of snipe fly (family Rhagionidae).

== Subspecies ==
Subspecies include:

- Chrysopilus asiliformis var. asiliformis (Preyssler, 1791)
- Chrysopilus asiliformis var. meridiomalis Bezzi, 1898

== Distribution ==
This widespread species is present in most of Europe.

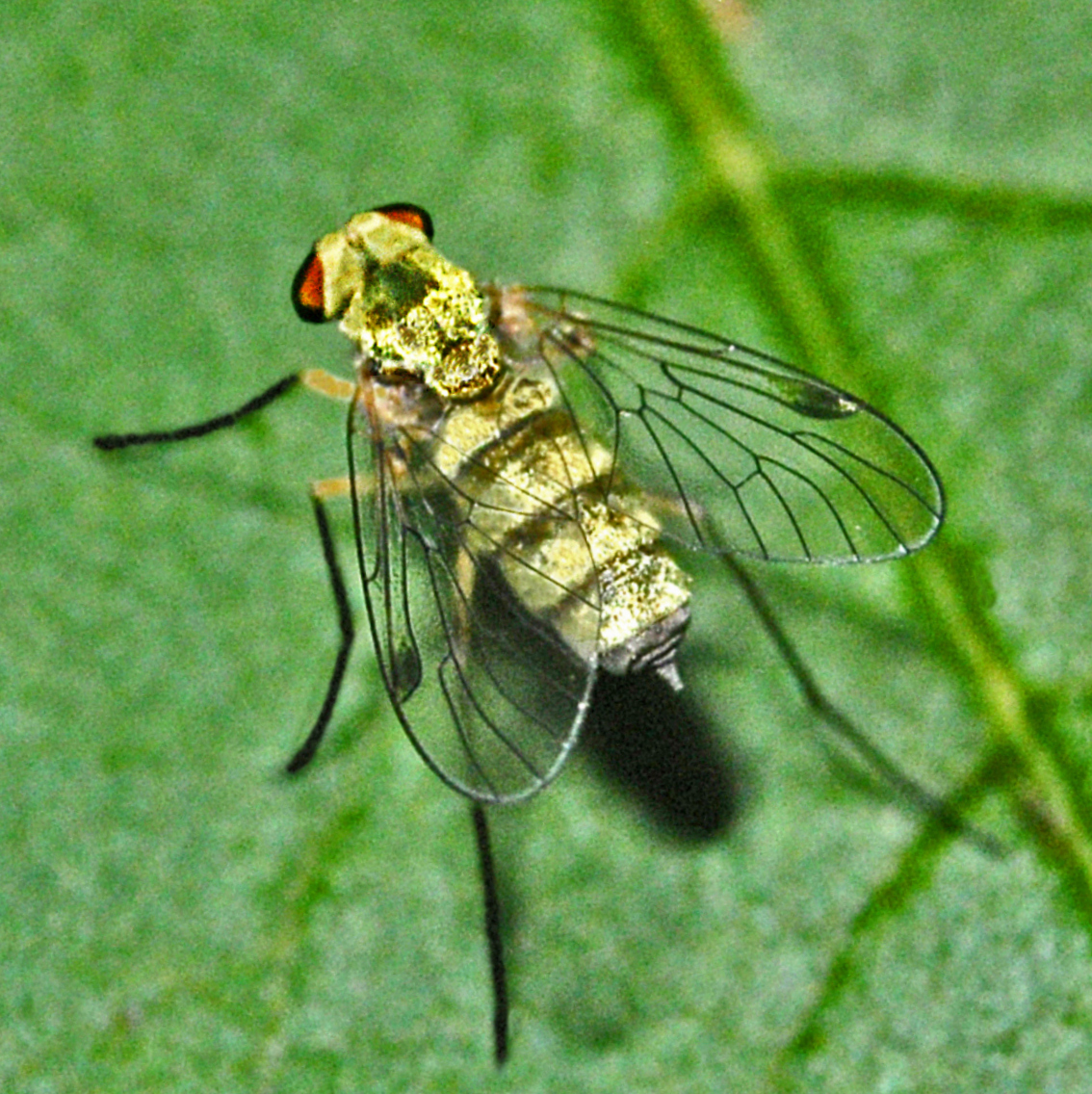
Chrysopilus asiliformis. Female

== Habitat ==
This species inhabits various environments, as scrubs, woodland edges, wetlands and gardens.

== Description ==
The adults grow up to 6–9 millimetres (0.24–0.35 in) long. This fragile-looking fly shows a slender body. Head, thorax and abdomen are grey dusted, with dark stripes on the abdomen, without bristles The legs are rather long and thin, with brownish-yellow femora. The wings are hyaline with a dark well marked pterostigma. Eyes are greenish.

== Biology ==
Adults can be encountered from May through September. The larvae probably develop in soil.

== Bibliography ==
- Watson, L., and Dallwitz, M.J. 2003 onwards. British insects: the families of Diptera. Version: 16 December 2010
