= Stylospania =

Scientific classification
- Kingdom: Animalia
- Phylum: Arthropoda
- Class: Insecta
- Order: Diptera
- Family: Rhagionidae
- Subfamily: Chrysopilinae
- Genus: Stylospania; Frey, 1954

Type species
- Stylospania lancifera Frey, 1954

Genus of flies

Stylospania is a genus of snipe flies of the family Rhagionidae. The genus is based on one single male specimen collected from Samar in the Philippines. It bears most of the features found in Chrysopilus, but with its stylate flagellum. The female of the genus is completely unknown. Stylospania lancifera is a delicate little fly of 4.5 mm.

== Distribution ==
Philippines.

== Species ==
- S. lancifera Frey, 1954
