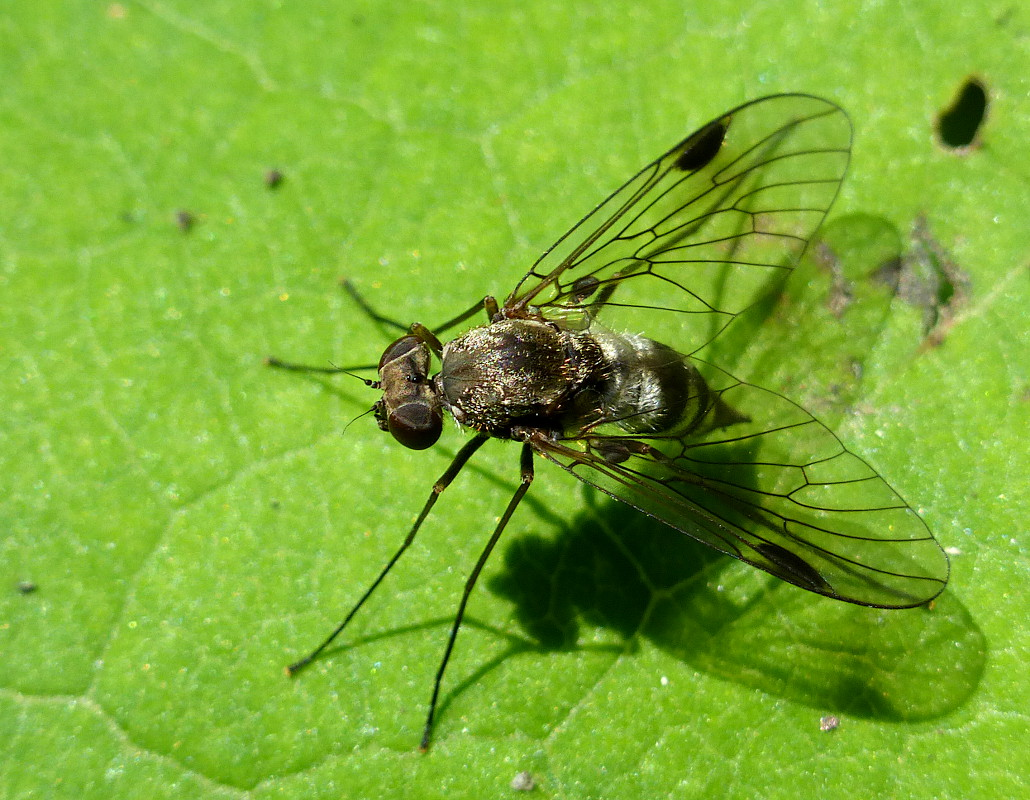
- Chrysopilus erythrophthalmus Slovakia

Scientific classification
- Kingdom: Animalia
- Phylum: Arthropoda
- Clade: Pancrustacea
- Class: Insecta
- Order: Diptera
- Family: Rhagionidae
- Subfamily: Chrysopilinae
- Genus: Chrysopilus
- Species: C. erythrophthalmus

Binomial name
- Chrysopilus erythrophthalmus Loew, 1840

= Chrysopilus erythrophthalmus =

Species of fly

Chrysopilus erythrophthalmus is a Palearctic species of snipe fly in the family Rhagionidae.

This species resembles Chrysopilus cristatus .The wing length is 7- 9mm . Males are entirely dark but females have several silver bands on the abdomen. It has shorter palps than C. cristatus (barely extending beyond the mouth). It has more conspicuous wings stigmas than cristatus. It is associated with stony upland streams.
