= Chrysopilus griffithi =

Scientific classification
- Kingdom: Animalia
- Phylum: Arthropoda
- Class: Insecta
- Order: Diptera
- Family: Rhagionidae
- Subfamily: Chrysopilinae
- Genus: Chrysopilus
- Species: C. griffithi

Binomial name
- Chrysopilus griffithi Johnson, 1897

Species of fly

Chrysopilus griffithi is a species of snipe fly in the family Rhagionidae.

== Distribution ==
United States
