= Chrysopilus elegans =

Scientific classification
- Kingdom: Animalia
- Phylum: Arthropoda
- Class: Insecta
- Order: Diptera
- Family: Rhagionidae
- Subfamily: Chrysopilinae
- Genus: Chrysopilus
- Species: C. elegans

Binomial name
- Chrysopilus elegans Schiner, 1868

Species of fly

Chrysopilus elegans is a snipe fly species in the genus Chrysopilus found from Costa Rica to Peru.
