= Chrysopilus velutinus =

Scientific classification
- Kingdom: Animalia
- Phylum: Arthropoda
- Class: Insecta
- Order: Diptera
- Family: Rhagionidae
- Subfamily: Chrysopilinae
- Genus: Chrysopilus
- Species: C. velutinus

Binomial name
- Chrysopilus velutinus Loew, 1861

Species of fly

Chrysopilus velutinus is a species of snipe fly in the family Rhagionidae.

== Distribustion ==
United States
