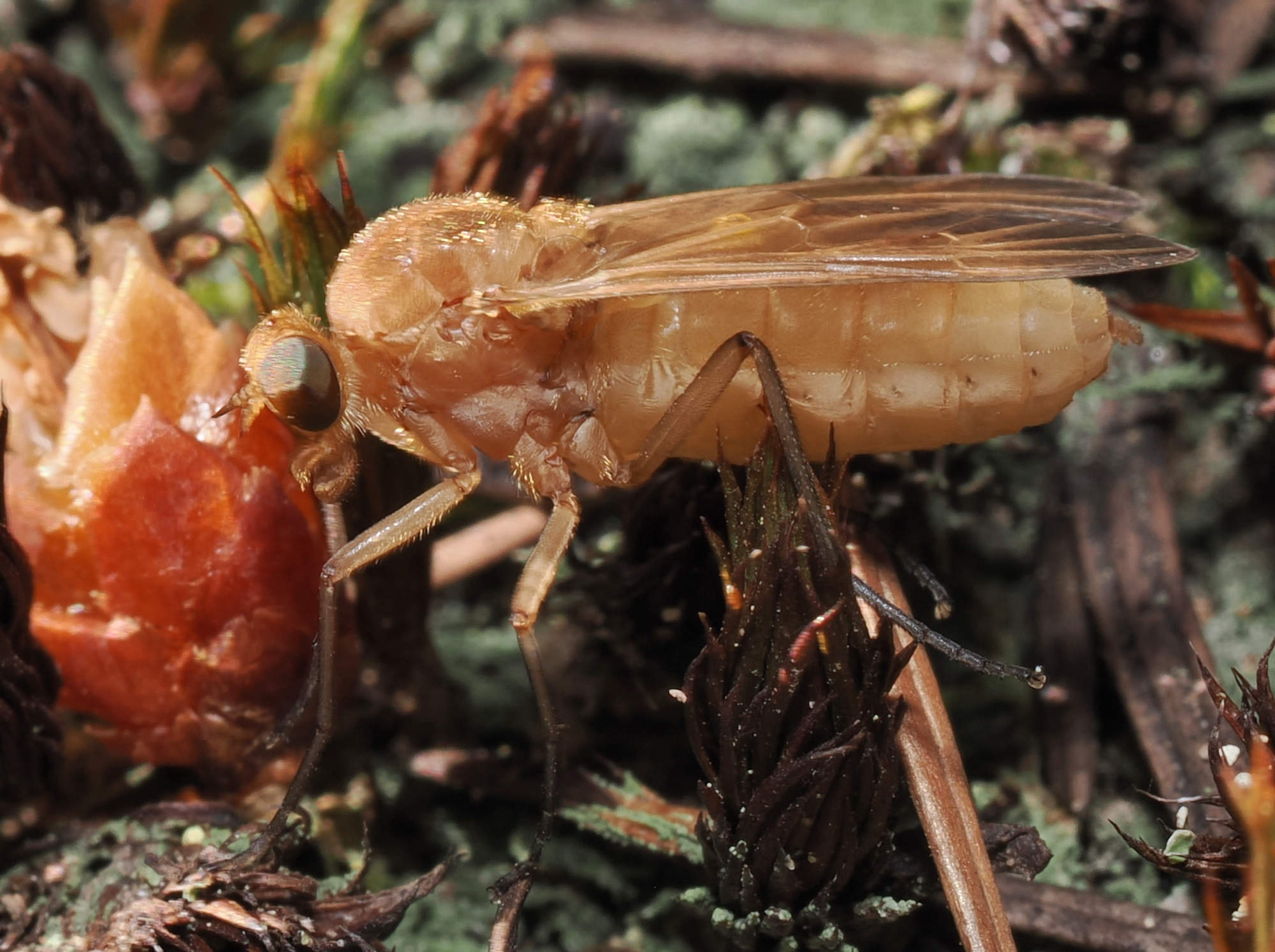

Scientific classification
- Kingdom: Animalia
- Phylum: Arthropoda
- Class: Insecta
- Order: Diptera
- Family: Rhagionidae
- Genus: Arthroceras
- Species: A. fulvicorne

Binomial name
- Arthroceras fulvicorne Nagatomi, 1966

Synonyms
- Arthroceras nigricapite Nagatomi, 1966; Arthroceras subsolanum Nagatomi, 1966

= Arthroceras fulvicorne =

Species of fly

Arthroceras fulvicorne is a species of snipe fly in the family Rhagionidae.

== Subspecies ==
These three subspecies belong to the species Arthroceras fulvicorne:

- Arthroceras fulvicorne fulvicorne Nagatomi, 1966
- Arthroceras fulvicorne nigricapite Nagatomi
- Arthroceras fulvicorne subsolanum Nagatomi
