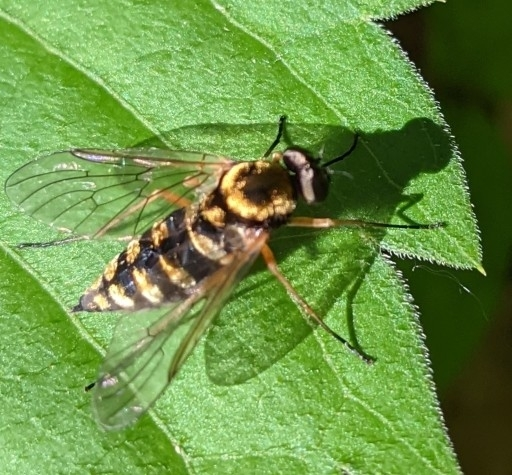

Scientific classification
- Domain: Eukaryota
- Kingdom: Animalia
- Phylum: Arthropoda
- Class: Insecta
- Order: Diptera
- Family: Rhagionidae
- Genus: Chrysopilus
- Species: C. ornatus

Binomial name
- Chrysopilus ornatus (Say, 1823)

Synonyms
- Leptis ornatus Say, 1823; Leptis servillei Guerin-Meneville, 1835

= Chrysopilus ornatus =

Species of fly

Chrysopilus ornatus, the ornate snipe fly, is a species of snipe fly in the family Rhagionidae.
