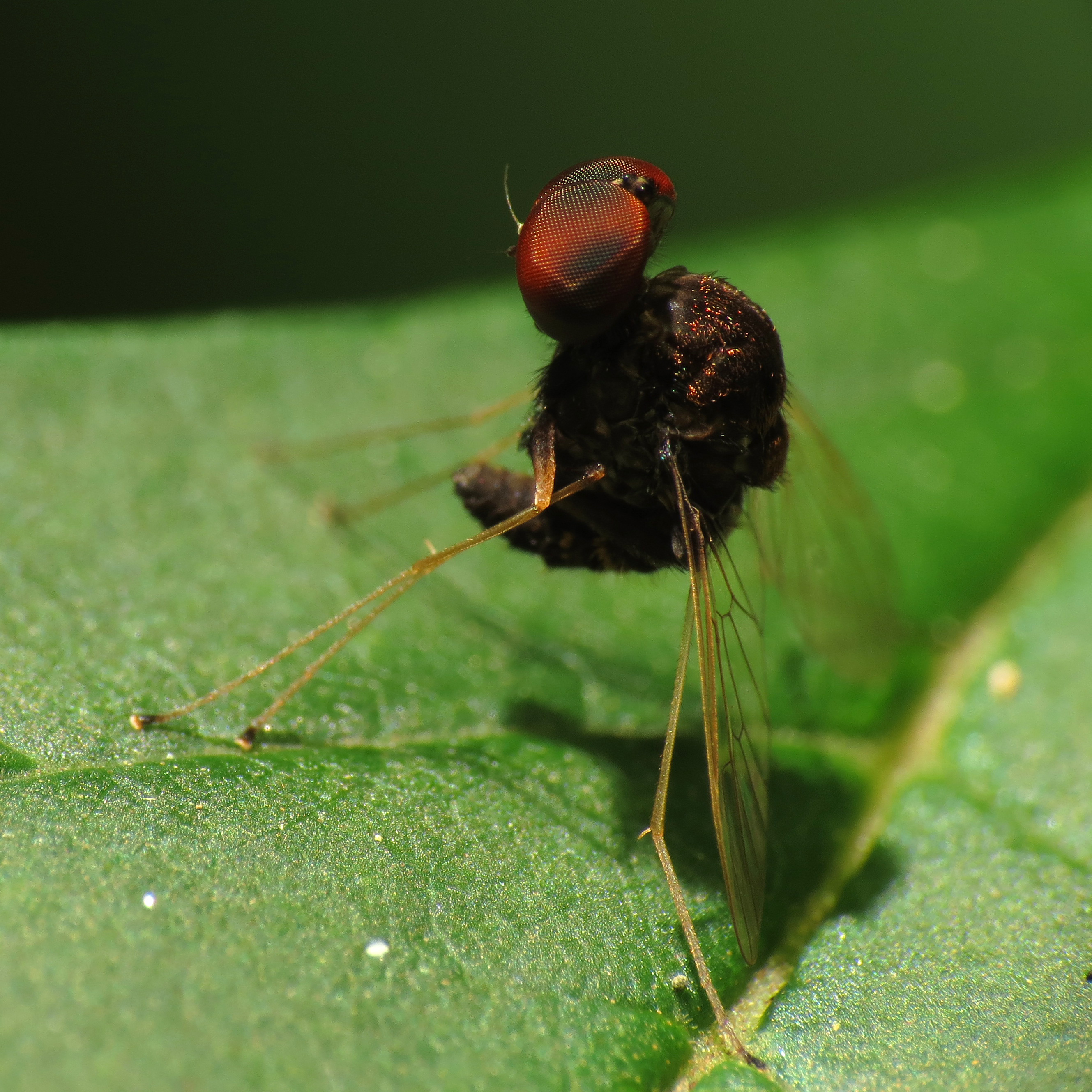

Scientific classification
- Kingdom: Animalia
- Phylum: Arthropoda
- Class: Insecta
- Order: Diptera
- Family: Rhagionidae
- Subfamily: Chrysopilinae
- Genus: Chrysopilus
- Species: C. basilaris

Binomial name
- Chrysopilus basilaris (Say, 1823)

Synonyms
- Leptis basilaris Say, 1823

= Chrysopilus basilaris =

Species of fly

Chrysopilus basilaris is a species of snipe fly in the family Rhagionidae. It is found in the United States.
