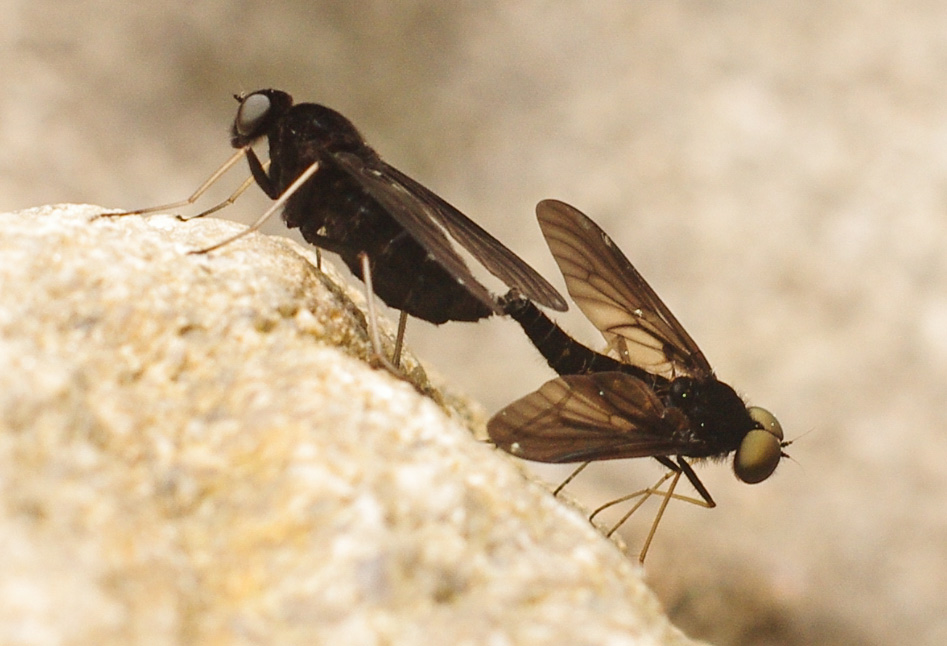
- Chyropilus connexus mating pair

Scientific classification
- Kingdom: Animalia
- Phylum: Arthropoda
- Class: Insecta
- Order: Diptera
- Family: Rhagionidae
- Subfamily: Chrysopilinae
- Genus: Chrysopilus
- Species: C. connexus

Binomial name
- Chrysopilus connexus Johnson, 1912

= Chrysopilus connexus =

Species of fly

Chrysopilus connexus is a species of snipe fly in the family Rhagionidae.

== Distribustion ==
United States
