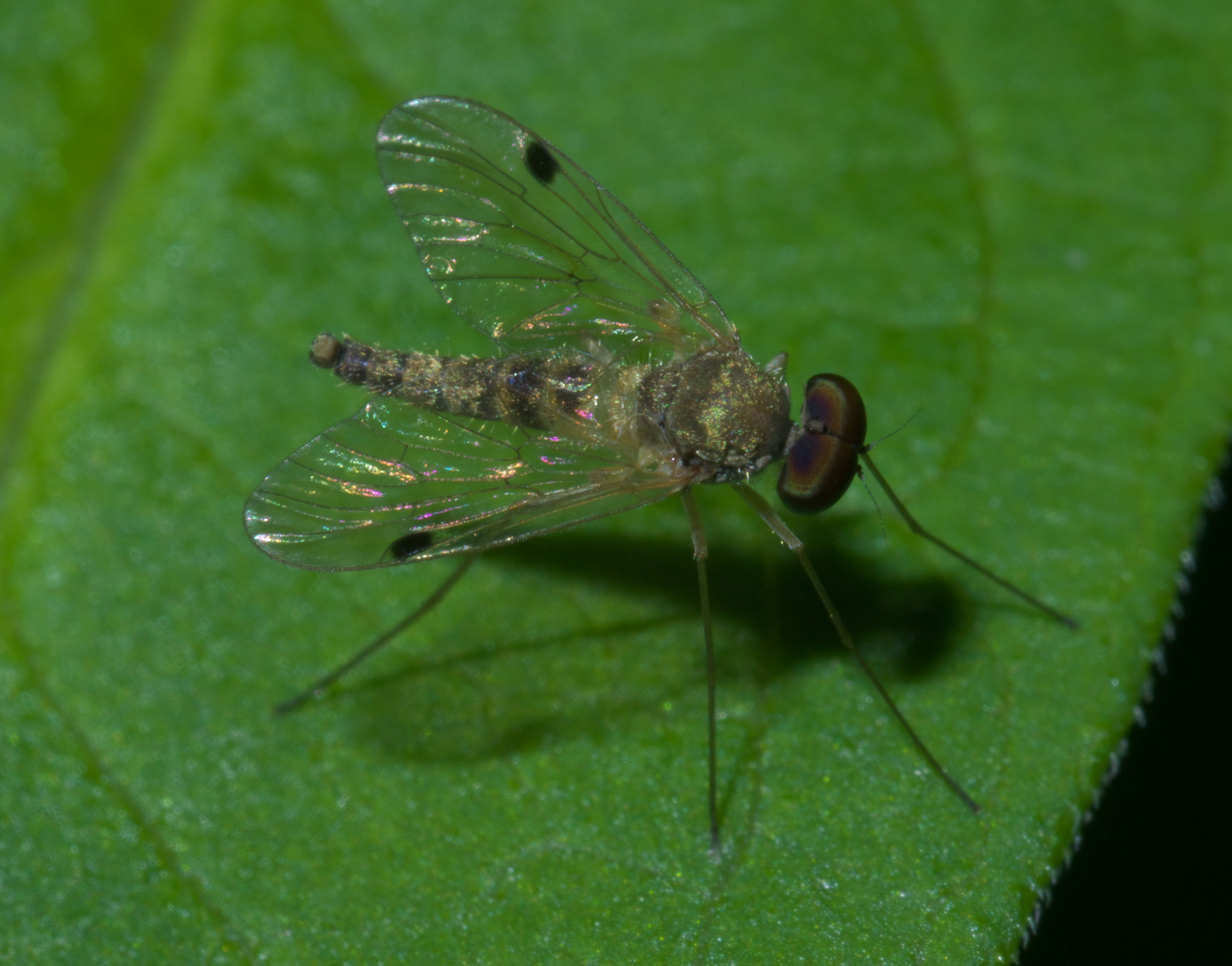

Scientific classification
- Kingdom: Animalia
- Phylum: Arthropoda
- Class: Insecta
- Order: Diptera
- Family: Rhagionidae
- Subfamily: Chrysopilinae
- Genus: Chrysopilus
- Species: C. modestus

Binomial name
- Chrysopilus modestus Loew, 1872

= Chrysopilus modestus =

Species of fly

Chrysopilus modestus is a species of snipe fly in the family Rhagionidae.

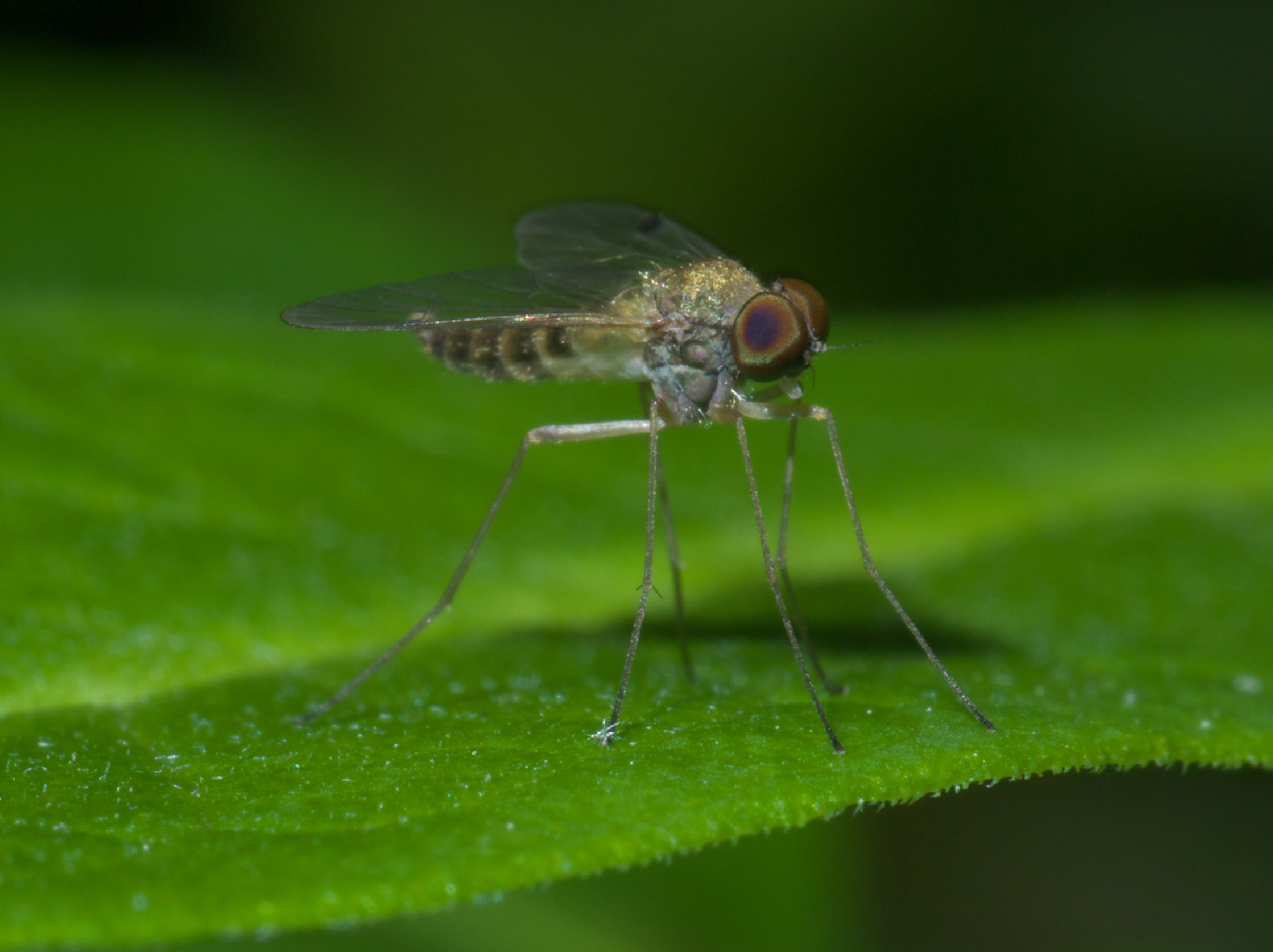

== Distribution ==
United States
