= Chrysopilus proximus =

Scientific classification
- Kingdom: Animalia
- Phylum: Arthropoda
- Class: Insecta
- Order: Diptera
- Family: Rhagionidae
- Subfamily: Chrysopilinae
- Genus: Chrysopilus
- Species: C. proximus

Binomial name
- Chrysopilus proximus (Walker, 1848)

Synonyms
- Leptis propinquus Walker, 1848; Leptis proximus Walker, 1848; Leptis simillimus Walker, 1848; Leptis auricincta Harris, 1835

Species of fly

Chrysopilus proximus is a species of snipe fly in the family Rhagionidae.

== Distribustion ==
United States
