= Chrysopilus tomentosus =

Scientific classification
- Kingdom: Animalia
- Phylum: Arthropoda
- Class: Insecta
- Order: Diptera
- Family: Rhagionidae
- Subfamily: Chrysopilinae
- Genus: Chrysopilus
- Species: C. tomentosus

Binomial name
- Chrysopilus tomentosus Bigot, 1887

Species of fly

Chrysopilus tomentosus is a species of snipe flies in the family Rhagionidae.

== Distribustion ==
United States
