= Chrysopilus ater =

Scientific classification
- Kingdom: Animalia
- Phylum: Arthropoda
- Class: Insecta
- Order: Diptera
- Family: Rhagionidae
- Subfamily: Chrysopilinae
- Genus: Chrysopilus
- Species: C. ater

Binomial name
- Chrysopilus ater (Williston, 1896)

Species of fly

Chrysopilus ater is a species of snipe fly in the family Rhagionidae

== Distribution ==
St. Vincent.
