= Chrysopilus pilosus =

Scientific classification
- Kingdom: Animalia
- Phylum: Arthropoda
- Class: Insecta
- Order: Diptera
- Family: Rhagionidae
- Subfamily: Chrysopilinae
- Genus: Chrysopilus
- Species: C. pilosus

Binomial name
- Chrysopilus pilosus Leonard, 1930

Species of fly

Chrysopilus pilosus is a species of snipe fly in the family Rhagionidae.

== Distribution ==
United States
