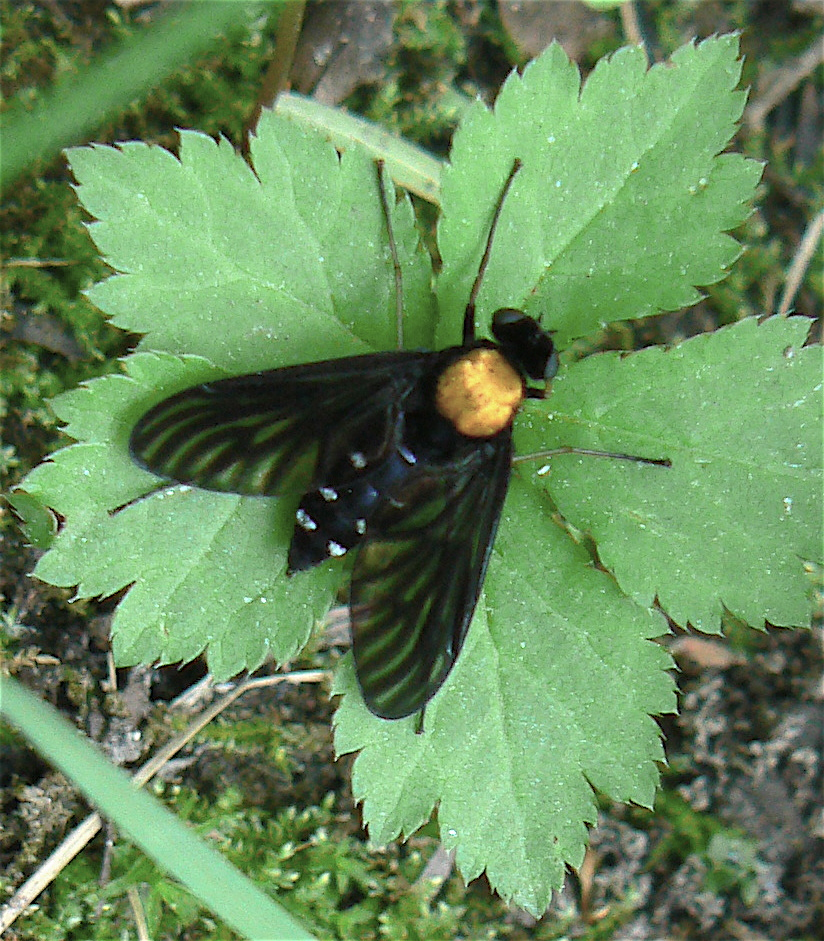
- Chrysopilus thoracicus

Scientific classification
- Kingdom: Animalia
- Phylum: Arthropoda
- Class: Insecta
- Order: Diptera
- Family: Rhagionidae
- Subfamily: Chrysopilinae
- Genus: Chrysopilus; Macquart, 1826

Type species
- Rhagio diadema Fabricius, 1775

Species
- See text

Synonyms
- Chrysopila Macquart, 1826 Solomomyia Nagatomi, 1982

= Chrysopilus =

Genus of flies

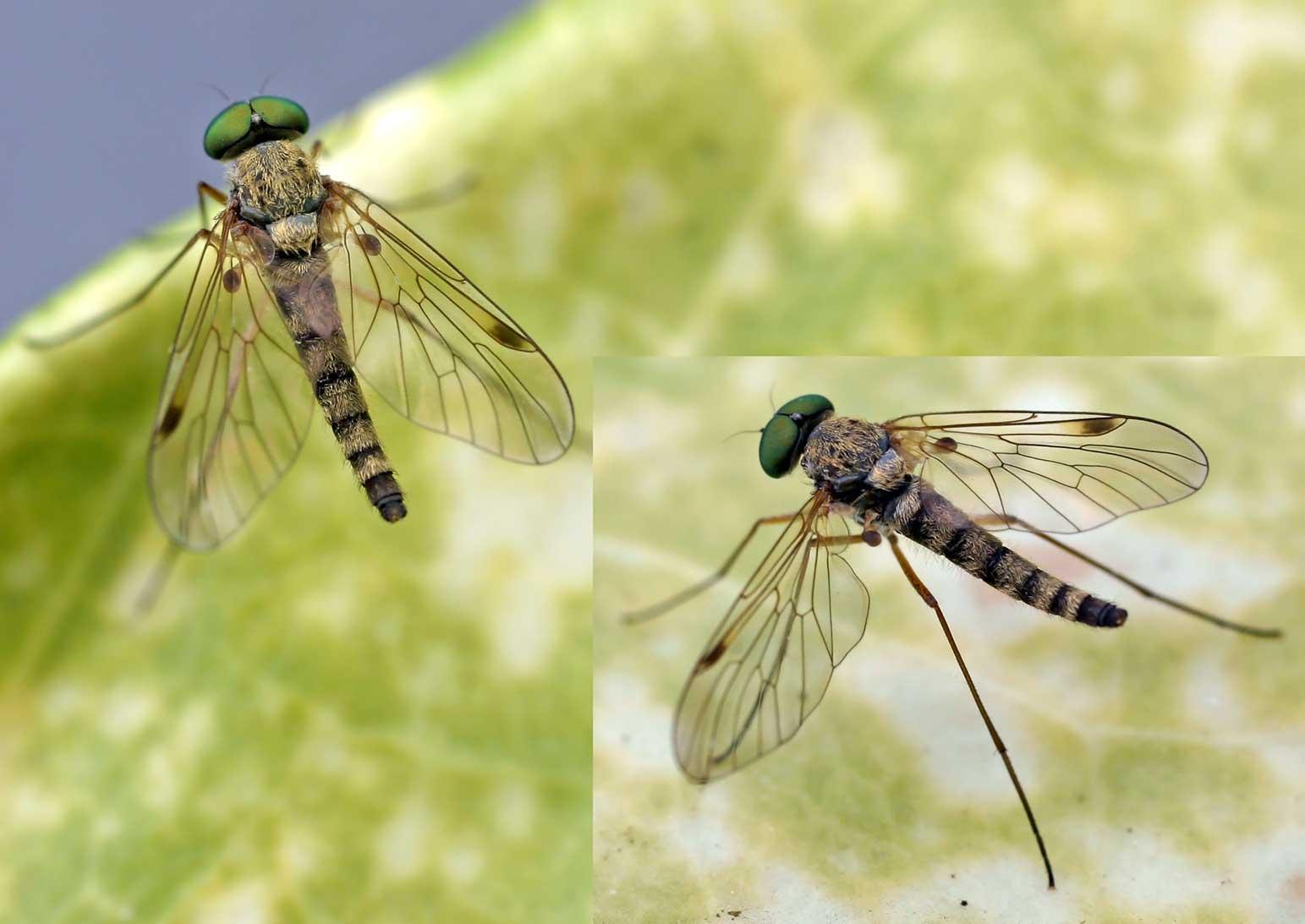
Chrysopilus splendidus

Chrysopilus cristatus male on Rumex sp. (video, 2m 15s)

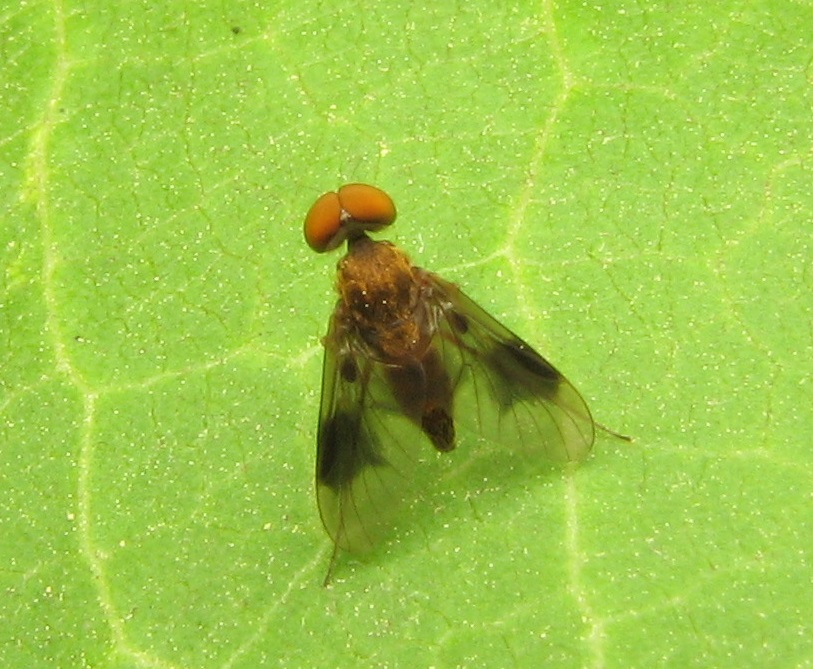
Chrysopilus quadratus

Chrysopilus is common, worldwide genus of predatory snipe flies. There are approximately 300 species in the genus, including fossil members that are sometimes found in amber.

== Species ==
- Chrysopilus aequicellulatus Frey, 1954
- Chrysopilus alaskaensis Hardy, 1949
- Chrysopilus albicornis Meijere, 1914
- Chrysopilus albobasalis Brunetti, 1920
- Chrysopilus albopictus Brunetti, 1909
- Chrysopilus alpicola Pokorny, 1886
- Chrysopilus alternatus Brunetti, 1920
- Chrysopilus amamiensis Nagatomi, 1968
- Chrysopilus americanus Schiner, 1868
- Chrysopilus amurensis Soboleva, 1986
- Chrysopilus andersoni Leonard, 1930
- Chrysopilus andicola Lindner, 1924
- Chrysopilus andringitrensis Stuckenberg, 1965
- Chrysopilus androgynus Paramonov, 1962
- Chrysopilus anglicus Cockerell, 1921
- Chrysopilus angustifacies Hardy, 1949
- Chrysopilus angustifrons Frey, 1954
- Chrysopilus ankaratrae Stuckenberg, 1965
- Chrysopilus anthracinus Bigot, 1887
- Chrysopilus antipoda Bigot, 1887
- Chrysopilus antongilensis Stuckenberg, 1965
- Chrysopilus apicalis Wulp, 1882
- Chrysopilus apicimaculatus Yang & Yang, 1991
- Chrysopilus arcticus Frey, 1918
- Chrysopilus arctiventris James, 1936
- Chrysopilus argenteofasciatus Bromley & Curran, 1931
- Chrysopilus argenteus Paramonov, 1962
- Chrysopilus argentina Shannon, 1927
- Chrysopilus argyrophorus Schiner, 1868
- Chrysopilus asiliformis (Preyssler, 1791)
- Chrysopilus ater Williston, 1896
- Chrysopilus aterrimus Williston, 1901
- Chrysopilus atricornis Stuckenberg, 1965
- Chrysopilus aymara Lindner, 1924
- Chrysopilus azurinus Frey, 1954
- Chrysopilus balbii Santos & Amorim, 2007
- Chrysopilus basalis Walker, 1860
- Chrysopilus basifasciatus Paramonov, 1962
- Chrysopilus basiflavus Yang & Yang, 1992
- Chrysopilus basilaris (Say, 1823)
- Chrysopilus beameri Hardy, 1949
- Chrysopilus bequaerti Curran, 1931
- Chrysopilus betsileorum Stuckenberg, 1965
- Chrysopilus bicoloratus Webb, 2012
- Chrysopilus bifasciatus Paramonov, 1962
- Chrysopilus binoculatus Edwards, 1915
- Chrysopilus binotatus Loew, 1869
- Chrysopilus birmanensis Brunetti, 1920
- Chrysopilus bisectus Oldroyd, 1939
- Chrysopilus bistriatipennis Brunetti, 1927
- Chrysopilus boettcheri Frey, 1954
- Chrysopilus brunneabdominalis Webb, 2012
- Chrysopilus brunneifrons Kertész, 1902
- Chrysopilus caducus (Wiedemann, 1828)
- Chrysopilus calchaqui Coscarón & Coscarón, 1995
- Chrysopilus caligatus Santos & Amorim, 2007
- Chrysopilus caliginosus Webb, 2012
- Chrysopilus calopterus Schiner, 1868
- Chrysopilus camargoi Santos & Amorim, 2007
- Chrysopilus capillosus Santos & Amorim, 2007
- Chrysopilus chazeaui Webb, 2012
- Chrysopilus choui Yang & Yang, 1989
- Chrysopilus clarapex Frey, 1954
- Chrysopilus claricinctus Lindner, 1923
- Chrysopilus clarus (Walker, 1852)
- Chrysopilus clemendoti Stuckenberg, 1965
- Chrysopilus cochinensis Brunetti, 1920
- Chrysopilus coeruleothorax Lindner, 1925
- Chrysopilus cognatus Stuckenberg, 1965
- Chrysopilus collessi Paramonov, 1962
- Chrysopilus commoni Paramonov, 1962
- Chrysopilus conjunctus Yang, Dong & Zhang, 2016
- Chrysopilus connexus Johnson, 1912
- Chrysopilus consanguineus Schiner, 1868
- Chrysopilus correctus Osten Sacken, 1882
- Chrysopilus cricosphaerota Speiser, 1914
- Chrysopilus cristatus (Fabricius, 1775)
- Chrysopilus cubensis Curran, 1931
- Chrysopilus dauricus Frey, 1954
- Chrysopilus davisi Johnson, 1912
- Chrysopilus decisus (Walker, 1857)
- Chrysopilus decoratus Meijere, 1911
- Chrysopilus delpontei Shannon, 1927
- Chrysopilus depressiconus Frey, 1954
- Chrysopilus dilatus Cresson, 1919
- Chrysopilus diplostigma Bezzi, 1916
- Chrysopilus ditissimus Bezzi, 1912
- Chrysopilus dives Loew, 1871
- Chrysopilus divisus Hardy, 1949
- Chrysopilus donato Curran, 1931
- Chrysopilus dubius Krivosheina & Sidorenko, 2006
- Chrysopilus duplicatus Krivosheina & Sidorenko, 2006
- Chrysopilus edgari Paramonov, 1962
- Chrysopilus egregius Meijere, 1919
- Chrysopilus elegans Schiner, 1868
- Chrysopilus erythrophthalmus Loew, 1840
- Chrysopilus everti Webb, 2012
- Chrysopilus facetticus Paramonov, 1962
- Chrysopilus fasciatus (Say, 1823)
- Chrysopilus fascipennis (Brunetti, 1920)
- Chrysopilus fasciventris Curran, 1931
- Chrysopilus fenestratus Bezzi, 1912
- Chrysopilus ferruginosus (Wiedemann, 1819)
- Chrysopilus fijiensis Webb, 2006
- Chrysopilus fimbriatus Stuckenberg, 1997
- Chrysopilus flaveolus (Meigen, 1820)
- Chrysopilus flavibarbis Adams, 1904
- Chrysopilus flavicomus Krivosheina & Sidorenko, 2006
- Chrysopilus flavifemur Yang, Dong & Zhang, 2016
- Chrysopilus flaviscutellus Yang & Yang, 1989
- Chrysopilus flavopilosus Brunetti, 1920
- Chrysopilus flavopunctatus Brunetti, 1909
- Chrysopilus foeda Loew, 1861
- Chrysopilus frankmcalpinei Webb, 2012
- Chrysopilus fulvidus Bigot, 1891
- Chrysopilus fuscicinctus Brunetti, 1927
- Chrysopilus fuscipes Bigot, 1887
- Chrysopilus gansuensis Yang & Yang, 1991
- Chrysopilus gemmiferus Frey, 1954
- Chrysopilus georgianus Hardy, 1949
- Chrysopilus gilvipennis Edwards, 1919
- Chrysopilus golbachi Coscarón & Coscarón, 1995
- Chrysopilus grandis Yang & Yang, 1993
- Chrysopilus gratiosus Paramonov, 1962
- Chrysopilus gravelyi Brunetti, 1920
- Chrysopilus gressitti (Nagatomi, 1982)
- Chrysopilus griffithi Johnson, 1897
- Chrysopilus griseipennis Bezzi, 1912
- Chrysopilus griveaudi Stuckenberg, 1965
- Chrysopilus guangxiensis Yang & Yang, 1992
- Chrysopilus guianicus Curran, 1931
- Chrysopilus guttipennis Walker, 1861
- Chrysopilus hakusanus Nagatomi, 1978
- Chrysopilus helvolus (Meigen, 1820)
- Chrysopilus heroicus Paramonov, 1962
- Chrysopilus howei Paramonov, 1962
- Chrysopilus huashanus Yang & Yang, 1989
- Chrysopilus hubeiensis Yang & Yang, 1991
- Chrysopilus humeralis Brunetti, 1912
- Chrysopilus humilis Loew, 1874
- Chrysopilus hyalinus Santos & Amorim, 2007
- Chrysopilus hybridus Lindner, 1924
- Chrysopilus iani Paramonov, 1962
- Chrysopilus illustris Frey, 1954
- Chrysopilus imitator Paramonov, 1962
- Chrysopilus impar (Walker, 1861)
- Chrysopilus incidens Curran, 1927
- Chrysopilus indistinctus Yang, Dong & Zhang, 2016
- Chrysopilus indris Stuckenberg, 1965
- Chrysopilus infuscatus Leonard, 1930
- Chrysopilus inka Lindner, 1924
- Chrysopilus insularis Schiner, 1868
- Chrysopilus intermedius Bezzi, 1895
- Chrysopilus invalidus Williston, 1901
- Chrysopilus irroratus Schiner, 1868
- Chrysopilus irwini Webb, 2012
- Chrysopilus itoi Nagatomi, 1958
- Chrysopilus ivontakae Stuckenberg, 1965
- Chrysopilus jamaicensis Johnson, 1894
- Chrysopilus jianfengensis Yang, Dong & Zhang, 2016
- Chrysopilus keiseri Stuckenberg, 1965
- Chrysopilus kimoroensis Stuckenberg, 1965
- Chrysopilus kincaidi Hardy, 1949
- Chrysopilus komurae Matsumura, 1911
- Chrysopilus kurentzovi Krivosheina & Sidorenko, 2007
- Chrysopilus kyotoensis Frey, 1954
- Chrysopilus laetus Zetterstedt, 1842
- Chrysopilus lateralis Oldroyd, 1939
- Chrysopilus latifrons Bezzi, 1898
- Chrysopilus latipennis Stuckenberg, 1965
- Chrysopilus latistigma Curran, 1931
- Chrysopilus latus Brunetti, 1920
- Chrysopilus leleji Krivosheina & Sidorenko, 2008
- Chrysopilus lemur Stuckenberg, 1965
- Chrysopilus leonardi Curran, 1931
- Chrysopilus leptiformis Kertész, 1902
- Chrysopilus lii Yang, Yang & Nagatomi, 1997
- Chrysopilus lilianae Soboleva, 1986
- Chrysopilus limpidipennis Lindner, 1931
- Chrysopilus lineatus Lindner, 1929
- Chrysopilus lokobiensis Stuckenberg, 1965
- Chrysopilus longipalpis Hardy, 1949
- Chrysopilus lucifer (Walker, 1852)
- Chrysopilus lucimaculatus Yang & Yang, 1992
- Chrysopilus luctuosus Brunetti, 1909
- Chrysopilus luculentus Nagatomi, 1968
- Chrysopilus ludens Loew, 1861
- Chrysopilus lugubrinus Meijere, 1924
- Chrysopilus lupinus Osten Sacken, 1881
- Chrysopilus luteolus (Fallén, 1814)
- Chrysopilus mackerrasi Paramonov, 1962
- Chrysopilus macularis Curran, 1931
- Chrysopilus maculipennis Walker, 1856
- Chrysopilus madecassus Stuckenberg, 1965
- Chrysopilus maerens Loew, 1873
- Chrysopilus magnipennis Brunetti, 1909
- Chrysopilus malaisei Frey, 1954
- Chrysopilus mandjelia Webb, 2012
- Chrysopilus marmoratus Brunetti, 1909
- Chrysopilus marumbiensis Coscarón, 2005
- Chrysopilus matsumurai Nagatomi, 1968
- Chrysopilus mcalpinei Paramonov, 1962
- Chrysopilus megacephalus Stuckenberg, 1965
- Chrysopilus melinus Webb, 2012
- Chrysopilus mexicanus Bellardi, 1861
- Chrysopilus microphallus Santos & Amorim, 2007
- Chrysopilus modestus Loew, 1872
- Chrysopilus mojiangensis Yang & Yang, 1990
- Chrysopilus montanorum Paramonov, 1962
- Chrysopilus moramangensis Stuckenberg, 1965
- Chrysopilus morimotoi Nagatomi, 1968
- Chrysopilus mundus Stuckenberg, 1965
- Chrysopilus mutabilis Stuckenberg, 1965
- Chrysopilus nagatomii Yang & Yang, 1991
- Chrysopilus nanus Williston, 1901
- Chrysopilus neimongolicus Yang, 1991
- Chrysopilus nemoris Stuckenberg, 1965
- Chrysopilus niger Bellardi, 1862
- Chrysopilus nigricauda Beling, 1873
- Chrysopilus nigriculus Krivosheina & Sidorenko, 2006
- Chrysopilus nigrifacies Nagatomi, 1968
- Chrysopilus nigrimaculatus Yang, 1991
- Chrysopilus nigrimarginatus Yang & Yang, 1990
- Chrysopilus nigripalpis Bezzi, 1912
- Chrysopilus nigrocinctus Brunetti, 1927
- Chrysopilus nigropilosus Yang, Zhu & Gao, 2005
- Chrysopilus nitidiventris Tonnoir, 1927
- Chrysopilus niveofarinosus Frey, 1954
- Chrysopilus nobilipennis Frey, 1954
- Chrysopilus norrisi Paramonov, 1962
- Chrysopilus noumea Webb, 2012
- Chrysopilus nubecula (Fallén, 1814)
- Chrysopilus nudus Cresson, 1919
- Chrysopilus obscuralatus Yang & Yang, 1989
- Chrysopilus obscuratus Meijere, 1914
- Chrysopilus obscuribarba Loew, 1869
- Chrysopilus obscuripes Speiser, 1923
- Chrysopilus okutanii Nagatomi, 1968
- Chrysopilus opacifrons Meijere, 1911
- Chrysopilus opalescens Brunetti, 1920
- Chrysopilus opalizans Meijere, 1913
- Chrysopilus ornatipennis Brunetti, 1909
- Chrysopilus ornatus (Say, 1823)
- Chrysopilus pallipes Loew, 1869
- Chrysopilus pallipilosus Yang & Yang, 1992
- Chrysopilus palparis Loew, 1869
- Chrysopilus panamensis Curran, 1931
- Chrysopilus paradoxus Krivosheina & Sidorenko, 2008
- Chrysopilus parvus Yang, Yang & Nagatomi, 1997
- Chrysopilus peninsularis Lee & Suh, 2021
- Chrysopilus peruanus Kertész, 1902
- Chrysopilus petersoni Webb, 2012
- Chrysopilus phaeopterus Santos & Amorim, 2007
- Chrysopilus philippii Lindner, 1924
- Chrysopilus pilosus Leonard, 1930
- Chrysopilus pingquanus Yang, Yang & Nagatomi, 1997
- Chrysopilus pingxianganus Yang & Yang, 1992
- Chrysopilus plaumanni Santos & Amorim, 2007
- Chrysopilus plautifrons Webb, 2012
- Chrysopilus plebeius Williston, 1901
- Chrysopilus poecilopterus Bezzi, 1912
- Chrysopilus polypilosus Yang, Dong & Zhang, 2016
- Chrysopilus praetiosus Loew, 1869
- Chrysopilus propinquus Kertész, 1902
- Chrysopilus proximus (Walker, 1848)
- Chrysopilus puella Williston, 1901
- Chrysopilus pullus Loew, 1869
- Chrysopilus quadratus (Say, 1823)
- Chrysopilus rhagiodes Bromley & Curran, 1931
- Chrysopilus rotundipennis Loew, 1861
- Chrysopilus ruiliensis Yang & Yang, 1990
- Chrysopilus saffranus (Bigot, 1887)
- Chrysopilus sarramea Webb, 2012
- Chrysopilus sauteri Bezzi, 1907
- Chrysopilus schinusei Lindner, 1924
- Chrysopilus schlingeri Webb, 2006
- Chrysopilus segmentatus Brunetti, 1909
- Chrysopilus semipictus Santos & Amorim, 2007
- Chrysopilus sericeus Bromley & Curran, 1931
- Chrysopilus shaanxiensis Yang & Yang, 1989
- Chrysopilus shananus Frey, 1954
- Chrysopilus shewelli Webb, 2012
- Chrysopilus shibuyai Nagatomi, 1968
- Chrysopilus sicula Loew, 1869
- Chrysopilus sigillatus Lindner, 1930
- Chrysopilus silvaticus Nagatomi, 1968
- Chrysopilus silvicola Nagatomi, 1968
- Chrysopilus similis Brunetti, 1920
- Chrysopilus simonovi Krivosheina & Sidorenko, 2006
- Chrysopilus simplex Meijere, 1904
- Chrysopilus smaragdinus Kertész, 1902
- Chrysopilus sobolevae Makarkin & Sidorenko, 2001
- Chrysopilus sogai Stuckenberg, 1965
- Chrysopilus sordidus Brunetti, 1920
- Chrysopilus splendidus (Meigen, 1820)
- Chrysopilus squamithorax Brunetti, 1927
- Chrysopilus stigma Brunetti, 1909
- Chrysopilus stigmatias (Bigot, 1887)
- Chrysopilus stigmaticus Cockerell, 1921
- Chrysopilus strigipennis Meijere, 1914
- Chrysopilus stylatus Walker, 1864
- Chrysopilus subalpicola Krivosheina, 2006
- Chrysopilus subamurensis Krivosheina & Sidorenko, 2006
- Chrysopilus subaquilis Nagatomi, 1968
- Chrysopilus subauratus Krivosheina, 2006
- Chrysopilus subpingquanus Krivosheina & Sidorenko, 2007
- Chrysopilus subsplendidus Krivosheina, 2006
- Chrysopilus subtrimaculatus Krivosheina & Sidorenko, 2007
- Chrysopilus subugensis Krivosheina & Sidorenko, 2006
- Chrysopilus sucini Stuckenberg, 1965
- Chrysopilus suomianus Szilády, 1934
- Chrysopilus superbus Stuckenberg, 1965
- Chrysopilus tanakai Nagatomi, 1978
- Chrysopilus tasmaniensis White, 1914
- Chrysopilus tenggeranus Frey, 1934
- Chrysopilus teskeyi Webb, 2012
- Chrysopilus testaceipes Bigot, 1887
- Chrysopilus testaceus Loew, 1858
- Chrysopilus thoracicus (Fabricius, 1805)
- Chrysopilus tomentosus Bigot, 1887
- Chrysopilus tonnoiri Paramonov, 1962
- Chrysopilus torrentium Thomas, 1978
- Chrysopilus trifasciatus Walker, 1860
- Chrysopilus trimaculatus Yang & Yang, 1989
- Chrysopilus tsacasi Thomas, 1979
- Chrysopilus tuckeri Bezzi, 1926
- Chrysopilus turkestanus Lindner, 1931
- Chrysopilus ugensis Nagatomi, 1968
- Chrysopilus ungaranensis Meijere, 1911
- Chrysopilus unicolor Brunetti, 1909
- Chrysopilus unicus Curran, 1931
- Chrysopilus vacillans Walker, 1858
- Chrysopilus vadoni Stuckenberg, 1965
- Chrysopilus valdivianus Philippi, 1865
- Chrysopilus variipilus Krivosheina & Sidorenko, 2006
- Chrysopilus varius Kertész, 1902
- Chrysopilus velutinus Loew, 1861
- Chrysopilus vespertinus Stuckenberg, 1965
- Chrysopilus villosissimus Paramonov, 1962
- Chrysopilus virtuosus Nagatomi, 1958
- Chrysopilus vitreus Santos & Amorim, 2007
- Chrysopilus vockerothi Webb, 2012
- Chrysopilus waigiensis (Bigot, 1887)
- Chrysopilus wirthi Stuckenberg, 1997
- Chrysopilus woodi Webb, 2012
- Chrysopilus wuzhishanus Yang, Dong & Zhang, 2016
- Chrysopilus xanthocromus Yang & Yang, 1990
- Chrysopilus xanthopus Hardy, 1949
- Chrysopilus xizangensis Yang, 1991
- Chrysopilus yerburyi Brunetti, 1920
- Chrysopilus yezonis Nagatomi, 1968
- Chrysopilus yunnanensis Yang & Yang, 1990
- Chrysopilus zanjensis Stuckenberg, 1965
- Chrysopilus zinovjevi Krivosheina & Sidorenko, 2007
