= Omphalophora =

Scientific classification
- Kingdom: Animalia
- Phylum: Arthropoda
- Class: Insecta
- Order: Diptera
- Family: Rhagionidae
- Subfamily: Spaniinae
- Genus: Omphalophora; Becker, 1900

Type species
- Omphalophora oculata Becker, 1900

Synonyms
- Poppiusiella Frey, 1918

Genus of flies

Omphalophora is a genus of snipe flies of the family Rhagionidae. They are delicate to fairly robust flies, from 3 to 10 mm. they are entirely black or brown in colour.

== Species ==
- Omphalophora arctica (Frey, 1918)
- Omphalophora cinereofasciata (Schilling, 1838)
- Omphalophora fasciata (Loew, 1870)
- Omphalophora lapponica Frey, 1911
- Omphalophora majuscula (Loew, 1870)
- Omphalophora nigripilosa (Hardy & McGuire, 1947)
- Omphalophora oculata Becker, 1900
