= Atherimorpha =

Scientific classification
- Kingdom: Animalia
- Phylum: Arthropoda
- Clade: Pancrustacea
- Class: Insecta
- Order: Diptera
- Family: Rhagionidae
- Subfamily: Rhagioninae
- Genus: Atherimorpha; White, 1914

Type species
- Atherimorpha vernalis White, 1914

Synonyms
- Bicalcar Lindner, 1923; Neorhagio Lindner, 1924; Therevirhagio Lindner, 1925; Philippoleptis Malloch, 1931; Artherimorpha Nagatomi, 1982 (Missp.)

Genus of flies

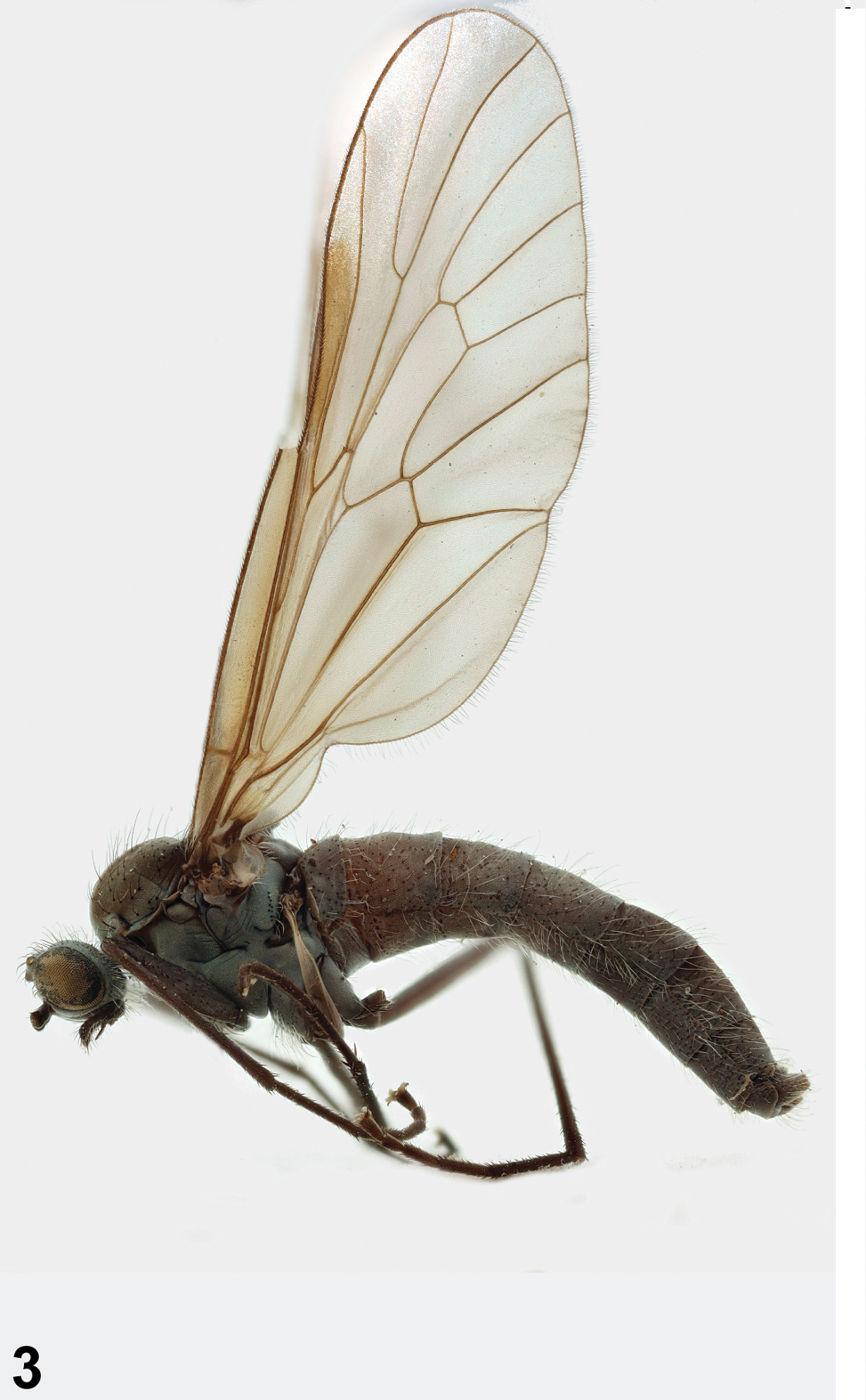
A photo of Atherimorpha latipennis

Atherimorpha is a genus of snipe fly of the family Rhagionidae.

== Species ==
- Atherimorpha agathae Paramonov, 1962
- Atherimorpha albipennis Bezzi, 1926
- Atherimorpha albohirta Malloch, 1932
- Atherimorpha alisae Paramonov, 1962
- Atherimorpha angustifrons Nagatomi & Nagatomi, 1990
- Atherimorpha atrifemur Malloch, 1932
- Atherimorpha bevisi Stuckenberg, 1956
- Atherimorpha claripennis (Philippi, 1865)
- Atherimorpha commoni Paramonov, 1962
- Atherimorpha corpulenta Paramonov, 1962
- Atherimorpha crassitibia Nagatomi & Nagatomi, 1990
- Atherimorpha edgari Paramonov, 1962
- Atherimorpha edwardsi Malloch, 1932
- †Atherimorpha festuca Jell & Duncan, 1986
- Atherimorpha flavicorpus Nagatomi & Nagatomi, 1990
- Atherimorpha flavofasciata Paramonov, 1962
- Atherimorpha flavolateralis Malloch, 1932
- Atherimorpha fulva Hardy, 1920
- Atherimorpha fusca Malloch, 1932
- Atherimorpha fuscicoxa Malloch, 1932
- Atherimorpha gracilipennis Nagatomi & Nagatomi, 1990
- Atherimorpha grisea (Philippi, 1865)
- Atherimorpha hirtula (Bigot, 1887)
- Atherimorpha imitans Malloch, 1932
- Atherimorpha infuscata Paramonov, 1962
- Atherimorpha irwini Nagatomi & Nagatomi, 1990
- Atherimorpha lamasi Santos, 2005
- Atherimorpha latipennis Stuckenberg, 1956
- Atherimorpha longicornu Nagatomi & Nagatomi, 1990
- Atherimorpha lugens (Philippi, 1865)
- Atherimorpha mcalpinei Paramonov, 1962
- Atherimorpha mensaemontis Stuckenberg, 1961
- Atherimorpha montana Hardy, 1927
- Atherimorpha nemoralis (Philippi, 1865)
- Atherimorpha nigrata (Philippi, 1865)
- Atherimorpha norrisi Paramonov, 1962
- Atherimorpha occidens Hardy, 1927
- Atherimorpha ornata Nagatomi & Nagatomi, 1990
- Atherimorpha praefica (Philippi, 1865)
- Atherimorpha pusilla Paramonov, 1962
- Atherimorpha rieki Paramonov, 1962
- Atherimorpha scutellaris Malloch, 1932
- Atherimorpha setosiradiata (Lindner, 1925)
- Atherimorpha stuckenbergi Nagatomi & Nagatomi, 1990
- Atherimorpha subannulata (Philippi, 1865)
- Atherimorpha tonnoiri Paramonov, 1962
- Atherimorpha triangularis Malloch, 1932
- Atherimorpha uptoni Paramonov, 1962
- Atherimorpha vernalis White, 1914
- Atherimorpha victoriana Paramonov, 1962
- Atherimorpha villosissima Paramonov, 1962
