= Alloleptis =

Scientific classification
- Kingdom: Animalia
- Phylum: Arthropoda
- Class: Insecta
- Order: Diptera
- Family: Rhagionidae
- Genus: Alloleptis; Nagatomi & Saigusa, 1982
- Species: A. tersus

Binomial name
- Alloleptis tersus Nagatomi & Saigusa, 1982

Genus of flies

Alloleptis is a genus of snipe fly of the family Rhagionidae. It is a small fly of about 4 mm and only known from Sulawesi. It currently contains only one species, Alloleptis tersus.
