= Desmomyia =

Scientific classification
- Kingdom: Animalia
- Phylum: Arthropoda
- Class: Insecta
- Order: Diptera
- Family: Rhagionidae
- Subfamily: Rhagioninae
- Genus: Desmomyia; Brunetti, 1912

Type species
- Desmomyia thereviformis Brunetti, 1912

Genus of flies

Desmomyia is a genus of snipe flies of the family Rhagionidae. They have the antennal scape elongated, longer than the pedicel, and the male hind first tarsomere enlarged. Desmomyia are mid-sized flies of about 5 to 7 mm and of grey, black, or brownish colour and the legs have some yellow or dark brown to black.

== Species ==
- D. sinensis Yang & Yang, 1997 - China
- D. thereviformis Brunetti, 1912 - India
