= Arthroteles =

Scientific classification
- Kingdom: Animalia
- Phylum: Arthropoda
- Clade: Pancrustacea
- Class: Insecta
- Order: Diptera
- Family: Rhagionidae
- Subfamily: Rhagioninae
- Genus: Arthroteles; Bezzi, 1926

Type species
- Arthroteles bombyliiformis Bezzi, 1926

Genus of flies

Arthroteles is a genus of snipe fly of the family Rhagionidae. Species of Arthroteles are moderately sized, from 5 to 7.5 mm. They are gray to dark gray in colour. Their antenna bears seven to eight tapering flagellomeres, the first much larger than all others.

They are only known from South Africa.

== Species ==
- Arthroteles bombyliiformis Bezzi, 1926
- Arthroteles cinerea Stuckenberg, 1956
- Arthroteles longipalpis Nagatomi & Nagatomi, 1990
- Arthroteles orophila Stuckenberg, 1956
