= Litoleptis =

Scientific classification
- Kingdom: Animalia
- Phylum: Arthropoda
- Class: Insecta
- Order: Diptera
- Family: Rhagionidae
- Subfamily: Spaniinae
- Genus: Litoleptis; Chillcott, 1963

Type species
- Litoleptis alaskensis Chillcott, 1963

Genus of flies

Litoleptis is a genus of snipe flies of the family, Rhagionidae.

== Species ==
- Litoleptis alaskensis Chillcott, 1963 - Alaska
- †Litoleptis araeostylus Greenwalt, 2019 - Montana
- Litoleptis asterellaphile Imada & Kato, 2016 - Japan
- Litoleptis chilensis Hennig, 1972 - Chile
- Litoleptis himukaensis Imada & Kato, 2016 - Japan
- Litoleptis izuensis Imada & Kato, 2016 - Japan
- Litoleptis japonica Imada & Kato, 2016 - Japan
- Litoleptis kiiensis Imada & Kato, 2016 - Japan
- Litoleptis niyodoensis Imada & Kato, 2016 - Japan
