= Schizella =

Scientific classification
- Kingdom: Animalia
- Phylum: Arthropoda
- Clade: Pancrustacea
- Class: Insecta
- Order: Diptera
- Family: Rhagionidae
- Subfamily: Chrysopilinae
- Genus: Schizella; Bezzi, 1916

Type species
- Schizella furcicornis Bezzi, 1916

Genus of flies

Schizella is a genus of snipe flies of the family Rhagionidae. They are delicate flies from 3.7 to 6.3 mm, with long, thin legs, and the thorax is brown to orange-brown with blue, purple, or golden-coloured setae.

This genus is only known from the Philippines.

== Species ==
- Schizella furcicornis Bezzi, 1916
- Schizella pulchrina Frey, 1954
- Schizella woodleyi Kerr, 2004
