= Rhagioninae =

Scientific classification
- Kingdom: Animalia
- Phylum: Arthropoda
- Class: Insecta
- Order: Diptera
- Family: Rhagionidae
- Subfamily: Rhagioninae; Latreille, 1802

Subfamily of flies

Rhagioninae is a worldwide subfamily of predatory snipe flies.

== Genera ==
- Arthroteles Bezzi, 1926 - Afrotropic
- Atherimorpha White, 1914 - Australasia, Neotropic, Afrotropic
- Desmomyia Brunetti, 1912 - Palearctic, Oriental
- Rhagio Fabricius, 1775 - Nearctic, Palearctic
- Sierramyia Kerr, 2010 - Nearctic/Neotropic
