= Spaniopsis =

Scientific classification
- Kingdom: Animalia
- Phylum: Arthropoda
- Clade: Pancrustacea
- Class: Insecta
- Order: Diptera
- Family: Rhagionidae
- Subfamily: Spaniinae
- Genus: Spaniopsis; White, 1914

Type species
- Spaniopsis tabaniformis White, 1914

Genus of flies

Spaniopsis is a genus of snipe flies of the family Rhagionidae. They are very stout bodied flies from 3 to 6 mm, with generally grey or dark grey thorax, and are only known from Australia.

== Species ==
- Spaniopsis clelandi Ferguson, 1915
- Spaniopsis longicornis Ferguson, 1915
- Spaniopsis mackerrasi (Paramonov, 1962)
- Spaniopsis marginipennis Ferguson, 1915
- Spaniopsis rieki (Paramonov, 1962)
- Spaniopsis tabaniformis White, 1914
- Spaniopsis vexans Ferguson, 1915
