= Spania (fly) =

Scientific classification
- Kingdom: Animalia
- Phylum: Arthropoda
- Class: Insecta
- Order: Diptera
- Family: Rhagionidae
- Subfamily: Spaniinae
- Genus: Spania; Meigen, 1830

Type species
- Spania nigra Meigen, 1830

Synonyms
- Archicera Szilády, 1934; Spanda Bigot, 1856

Genus of flies

Spania is a genus of snipe flies of the family Rhagionidae.

Spania are small - 2 to 3.0 mm, dark brown to black in colour.

== Species ==
- Spania americana Johnson, 1923
- Spania kyushuensis Nagatomi & Saigusa, 1982
- Spania naitoi Nagatomi & Saigusa, 1982
- Spania nigra Meigen, 1830
- Stylospania lancifera Frey, 1954
