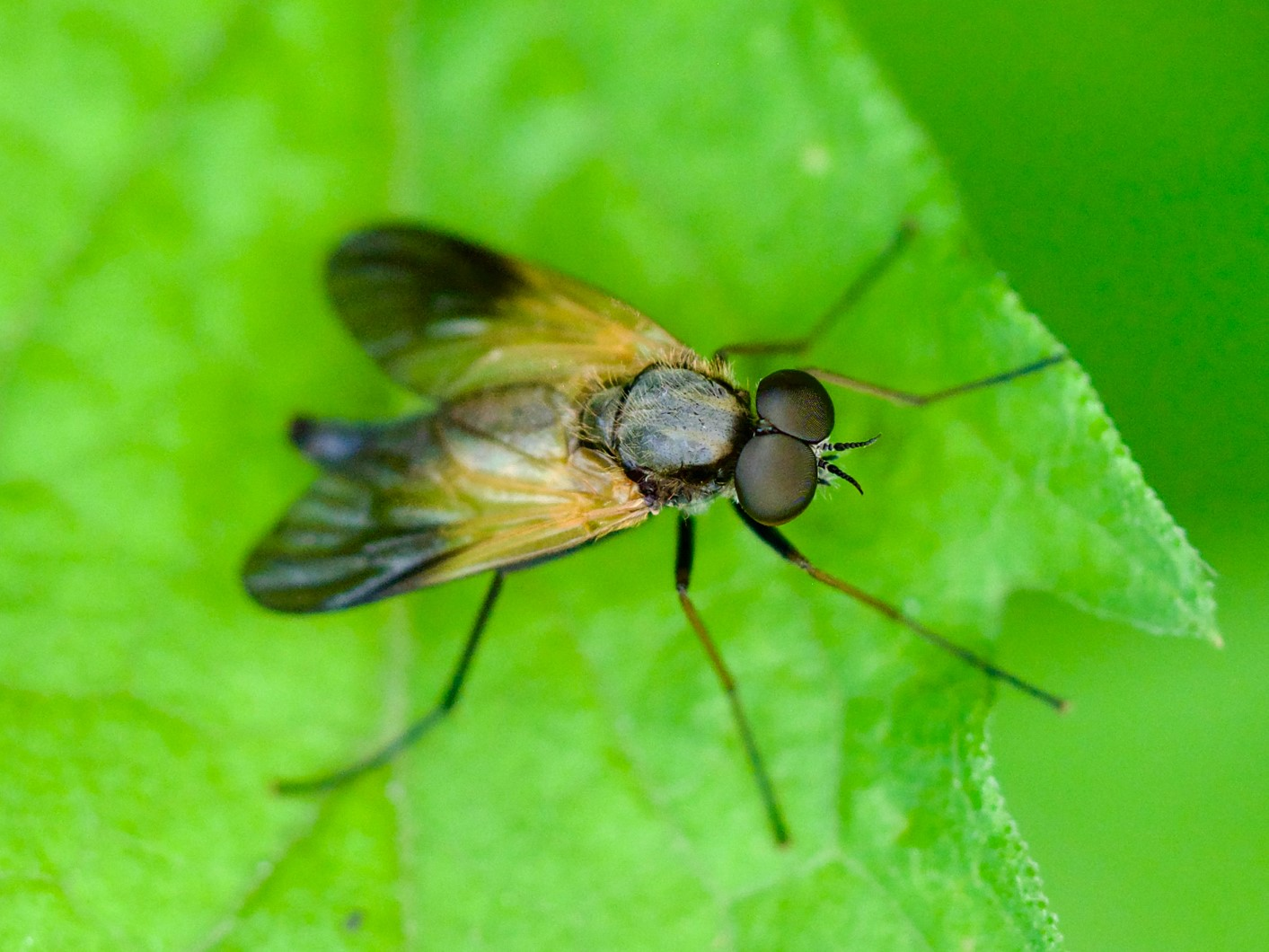
- Arthroceras japonicum

Scientific classification
- Kingdom: Animalia
- Phylum: Arthropoda
- Class: Insecta
- Order: Diptera
- Family: Rhagionidae
- Subfamily: Arthrocerinae
- Genus: Arthroceras; Williston, 1886

Type species
- Arthroceras pollinosum Williston, 1886

Synonyms
- Ussuriella Paramonov, 1929; Pseudocoenomyia Ôuchi, 1943

= Arthroceras =

Genus of flies

Arthroceras is a genus of snipe flies in the family Rhagionidae. Species of the genus Arthroceras are mid-sized to large 4.5 to 13 millimetres (0.18 to 0.51 in), black, grey, or yellowish-colored flies that have a fairly long, tapering antenna consisting of 5–8 flagellomeres. Within the family Rhagonidae, some authorities place the genus in the subfamily Arthrocerinae, in which it is the only genus.

== Species ==
- A. fulvicorne Nagatomi, 1966 – Neotropic
  - A. fulvicorne nigricapite Nagatomi, 1966
  - A. fulvicorne subsolanum Nagatomi, 1966
- A. subaquilum Nagatomi, 1966 – Neotropic
- A. gadi (Paramonov, 1929) – Palearctic
- A. japonicum Nagatomi, 1954 – Palearctic
- A. leptis (Osten Sacken, 1878) – Neotropic
- A. pollinosum Williston, 1886 – Neotropic
- A. rubrifrons Nagatomi, 1966 – Palearctic
- A. sinense (Ouchi, 1943) – Palearctic
