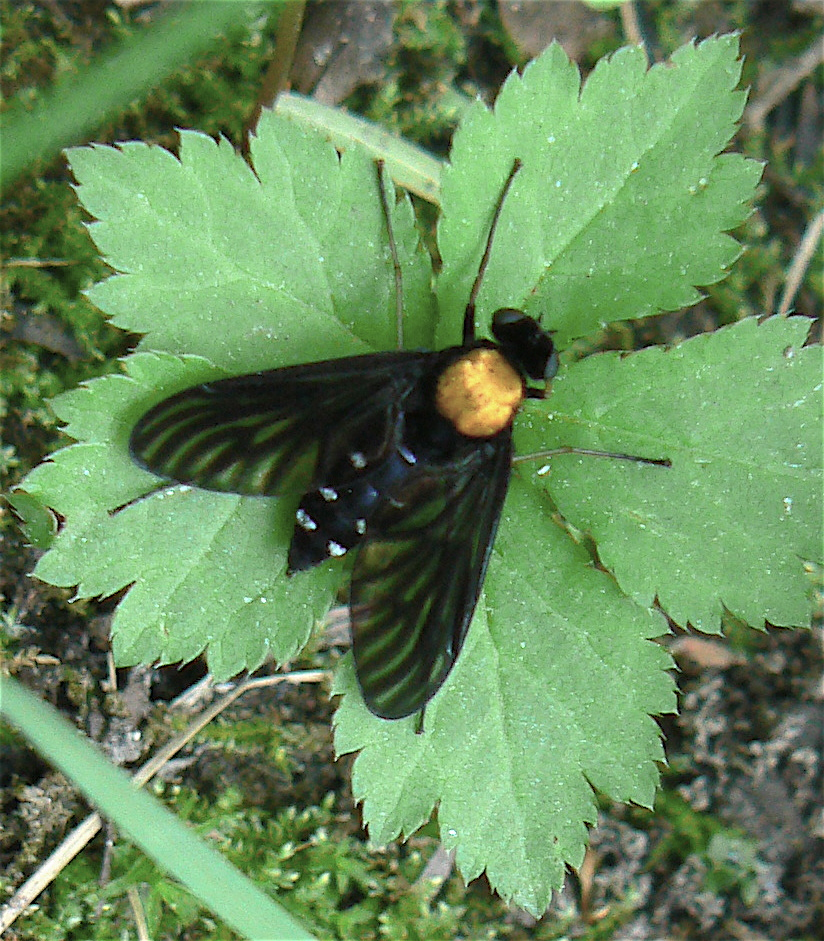

Scientific classification
- Kingdom: Animalia
- Phylum: Arthropoda
- Class: Insecta
- Order: Diptera
- Family: Rhagionidae
- Subfamily: Chrysopilinae
- Genus: Chrysopilus
- Species: C. thoracicus

Binomial name
- Chrysopilus thoracicus (Fabricius, 1805)

Synonyms
- Leptis thoracica Fabricius, 1805

= Chrysopilus thoracicus =

Species of fly

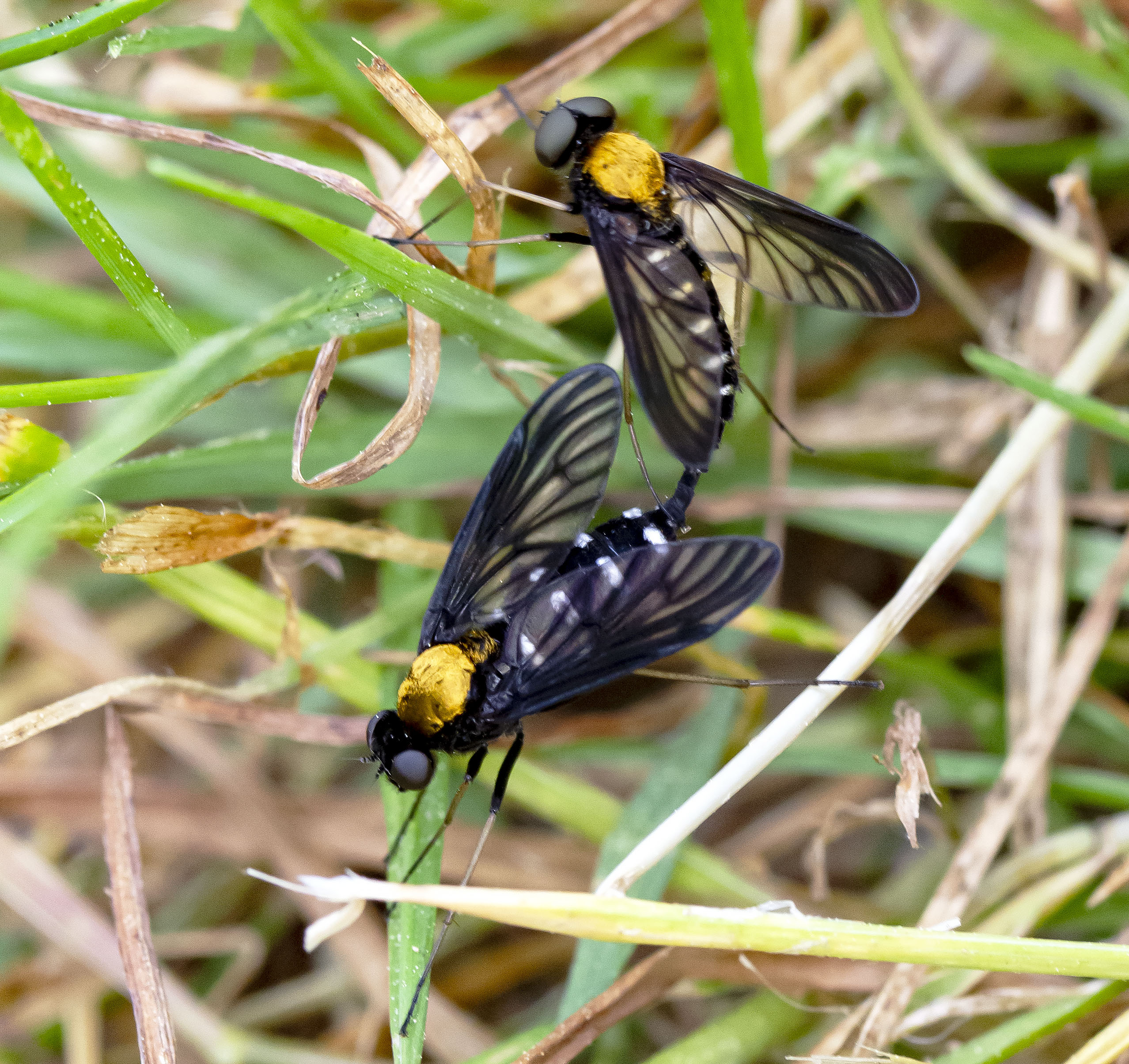
Chrysopilus thoracicus

Chrysopilus thoracicus, the golden-backed snipe fly, is a species of snipe fly in the family Rhagionidae.

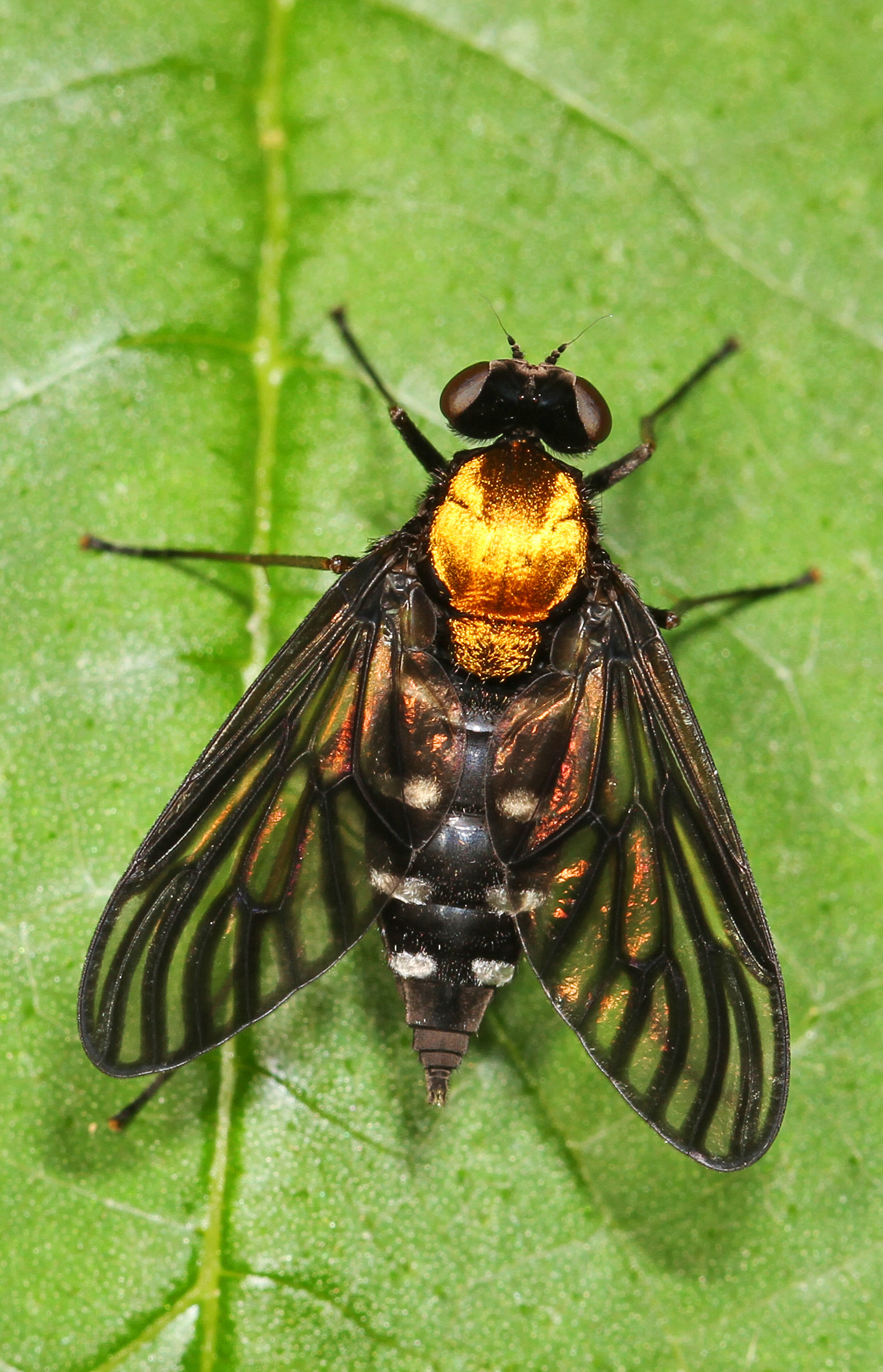
Golden-backed snipe fly, Chrysopilus thoracicus

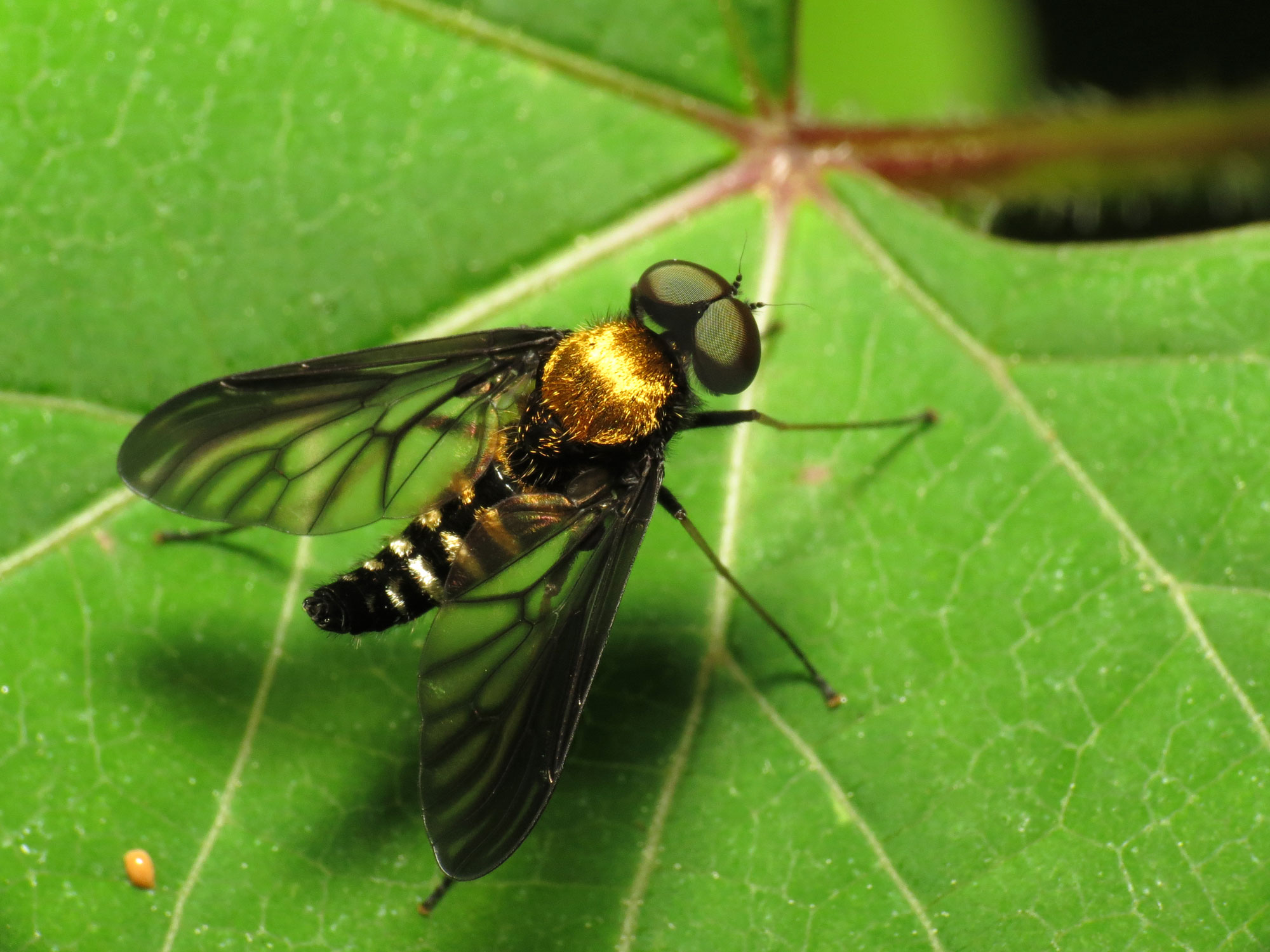
Golden-backed snipe fly, Chrysopilus thoracicus

It is usually found in woodland areas of the eastern part of North America.

== Distribution ==
Canada, United States
