= Jan Daniel Preysler =

Czech entomologist

Jan Daniel Preysler, also known as Johan Daniel Preyssler or Johann Daniel Preyßler (1768, Prague – 23 April 1839) was a Czech entomologist.

In 1789 he became an adjunct to the Imperial administrative office in Prague, where he was in 1801 promoted to Administrator, and in 1805 became a Counselor. After that, in 1807 he was board member of the St. John the Baptist Orphanage in Prague. Between 1808 and 1832 are no records of his life—he probably lived outside Prague or abroad. He returned to Bohemia in 1833 as a mining engineer in Zbiroh. Preysler worked mainly on Coleoptera but also on other insects and spiders.

== Works ==
- 1790 Verzeichnis böhmischen Insekten. Prag, 108 pp + 2 medirytiny.
- 1791 Beschreibungen und Abbildungen derjenigen Insekten, welche in Sammlungen nicht aufzubewahren sind, dann aller, die noch ganz neu, und solcher, von denen wir noch keine oder doch sehr schlechte Abbildung besitzen. In: Mayer, J. (ed.): Sammlung physikalischer Aufsätze, besonders die Böhmische Naturgeschichte betreffend, von einer Gesellschaft Böhmischer Naturforscher. I. Dresden: p. 55 – 151.
- Preysler, J. D.& Lindacker J. T. & Hofer J. K.: 1793, Beobachtungen über Gegenstände der Natur auf einer Reise durch den Böhmerwald im Sommer 1791. In: Mayer J. (ed.): Sammlung physikalischer Aufsätze, besonders die Böhmische Naturgeschichte betreffend, von einer Gesellschaft Böhmischer Naturforscher. III. Dresden: p. 135 – 378.

New species described by Preysler include Claviger testaceus Preysler, 1790, Cheilosia rufipes Preysler, 1793,Aranea folium Preysler, 1791 and Chrysopilus asiliformis Preysler, 1791. His collection of insects is lost, but several specimens of insects are preserved in the Prague National Museum.
