= Spaniinae =

Scientific classification
- Domain: Eukaryota
- Kingdom: Animalia
- Phylum: Arthropoda
- Class: Insecta
- Order: Diptera
- Family: Rhagionidae
- Subfamily: Spaniinae; Frey, 1954

Subfamily of flies

Spaniinae is a worldwide subfamily of predatory snipe flies.

== Genera ==
- Litoleptis Chillcott, 1963 - Nearctic, Oriental, Neotropic
- Omphalophora Becker, 1900 - Palearctic, Nearctic
- †Palaeoarthroteles Kovalev & Mostovski, 1997
- Ptiolina Stæger in Zetterstedt, 1842 - Nearctic, Palearctic
- Spania Meigen, 1830 - Nearctic, Palearctic
- Spaniopsis White, 1914 - Australasia
- Symphoromyia Frauenfeld, 1867 - Nearctic, Palearctic
