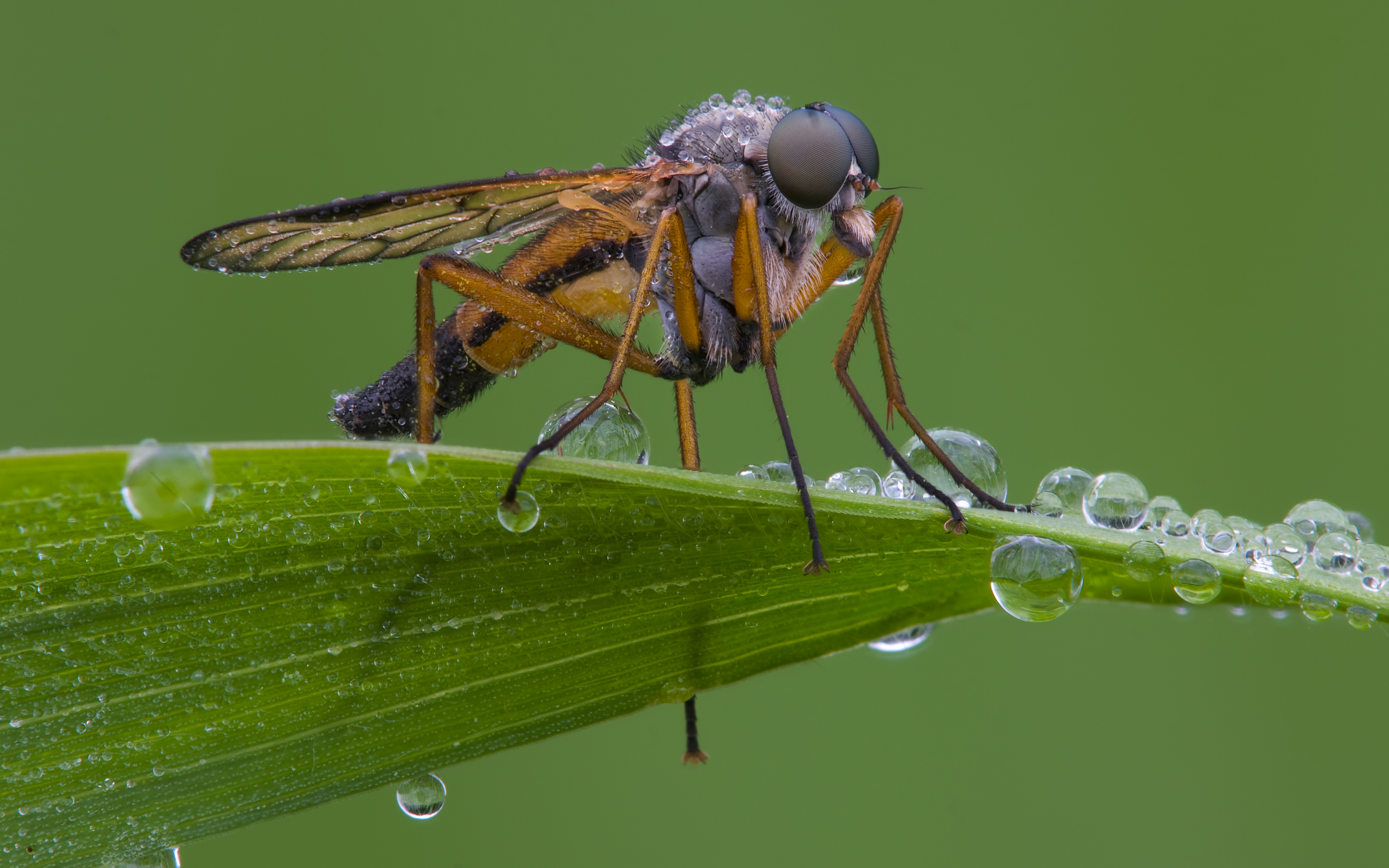
- Rhagio scolopaceus

Scientific classification
- Kingdom: Animalia
- Phylum: Arthropoda
- Clade: Pancrustacea
- Class: Insecta
- Order: Diptera
- Suborder: Brachycera
- Infraorder: Tabanomorpha
- Superfamily: Rhagionoidea
- Family: Rhagionidae; Latreille, 1802

Synonyms
- Leptidae Burmeister, 1837

= Rhagionidae =

Rhagionidae Temporal range: Anisian–Recent

Family of flies

Rhagionidae or snipe flies are a small family of flies. They get their name from the similarity of their often prominent proboscis to the beak of a snipe.

== Description ==
Rhagionidae are medium-sized to large flies with slender bodies and stilt-like legs. The mouthparts are adapted for piercing and many species are haematophagous as adults, while others are predatory on other insects. They are typically brown and yellow flies, and lack bristles. The larvae are also predatory and are mostly terrestrial, although some are aquatic.

Snipe flies in the genus Rhagio are sometimes called "down-looker" flies after their habit of perching head-downward on tree trunks.

== Classification ==
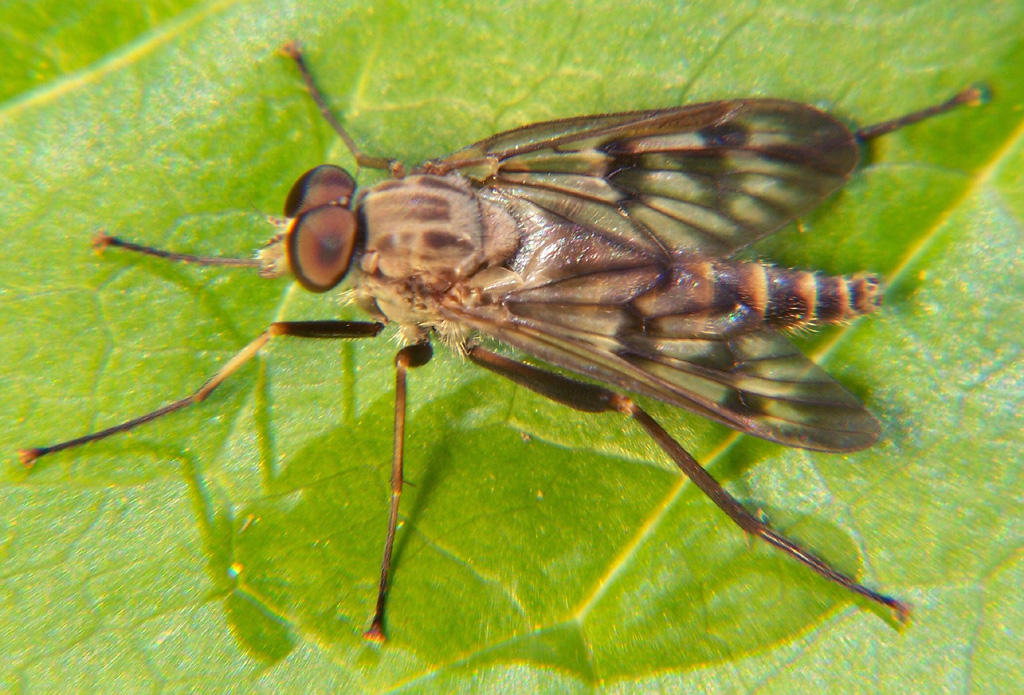
Rhagio mystaceus "down-looker fly"

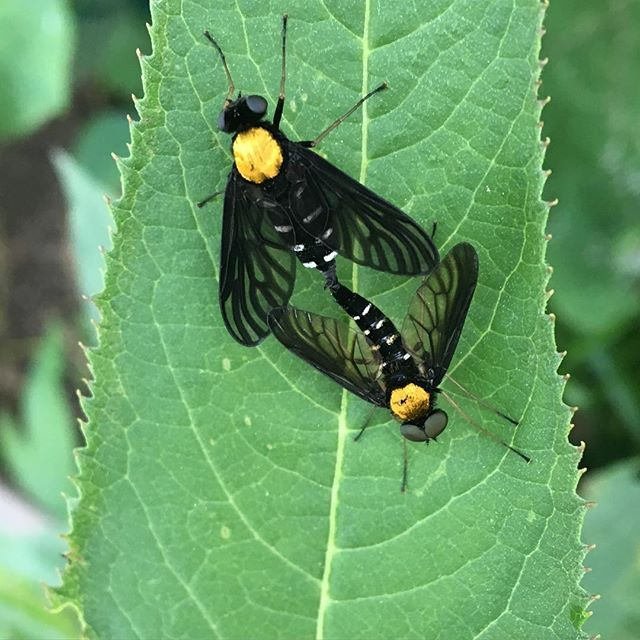
Chrysopilus thoracicus mating - Female(top) and Male(bottom)

The family is contained in Brachycera infraorder Tabanomorpha, and several of its constituent groups have been recently elevated to family rank. Atherix (and related genera) now comprise the Athericidae, Vermileo (and related genera) now comprise the Vermileonidae, and the genera Austroleptis and Bolbomyia are each now the sole members of their own families (Austroleptidae and Bolbomyiidae).

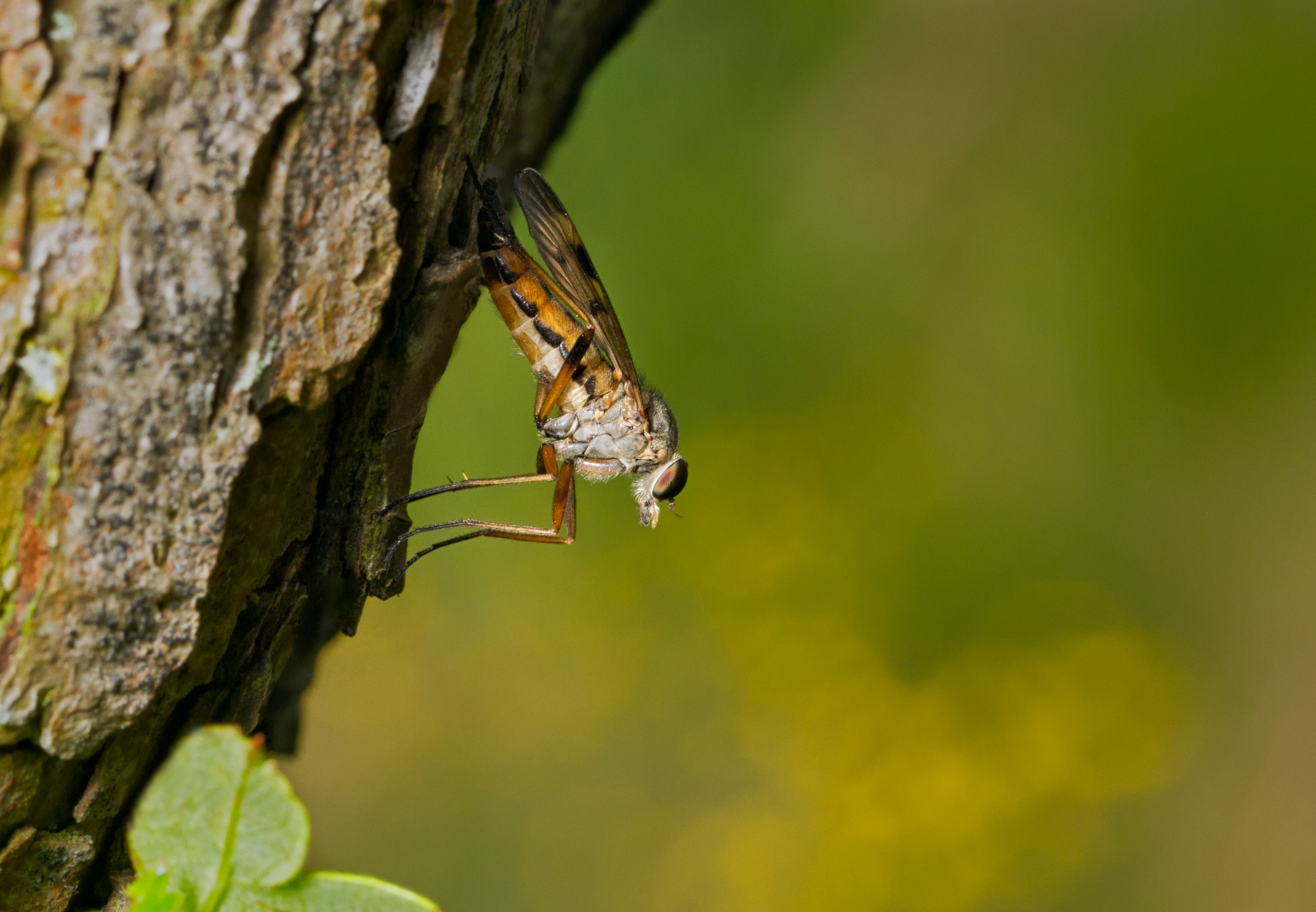
Rhagio scolopaceus exhibiting its "down-looker" behaviour

== List of subfamilies and genera ==
Arthrocerinae Williston, 1886

- Arthroceras Williston, 1886 - Nearctic, Palearctic

Chrysopilinae Bezzi, 1903

- Chrysopilus Macquart, 1826 - Nearctic, Palearctic, Afrotropic, Neotropic, Oriental
- Schizella Bezzi, 1926 - Philippines
- Stylospania Frey, 1954 - Philippines

Rhagioninae Latreille, 1802

- Arthroteles Bezzi, 1926 - Afrotropic
- Atherimorpha White, 1914 - Australasia, Neotropic, Afrotropic
- Desmomyia Brunetti, 1912 - Palearctic, Oriental
- Rhagio Fabricius, 1775 - Nearctic, Palearctic
- Sierramyia Kerr, 2010 - Nearctic/Neotropic

Spaniinae Frey, 1954

- Litoleptis Chillcott, 1963 - Nearctic, Oriental, Neotropic
- Omphalophora Becker, 1900 - Palearctic, Nearctic
- †Palaeoarthroteles Kovalev & Mostovski, 1997
- Ptiolina Staeger in Zetterstedt, 1842 - Nearctic, Palearctic
- Spania Meigen, 1830 - Nearctic, Palearctic
- Spaniopsis White, 1914 - Australasia
- Symphoromyia Frauenfeld, 1867 - Nearctic, Palearctic

Incertae sedis

- Alloleptis Nagatomi & Saigusa in Nagatomi, 1982 - Sulawesi

== See also ==
- Use of DNA in forensic entomology
