= Active (ship) =

Numerous vessels have borne the name Active :

- Active (1764 ship) was almost rebuilt in 1785. The next year her trade was given as London-Jamaica. She transported convicts to Australia in 1791. She returned home via Bombay, carrying a cargo for the British East India Company (EIC). A French privateer captured her in May 1793 as she was returning to Britain.
- Active (1781 ship) was built in Chester in 1781. Initially, she traded with the Baltic and North America. From 1798 she made four complete voyages as a slave ship in the triangular trade in enslaved persons. A privateer captured her in September 1805 during her fifth slave voyage, after she had embarked her slaves, and took her into the River Plate.
- Active (1789 ship) was launched at Bermuda. She transferred to Liverpool circa 1798 and then spent a few years as a West Indiaman. Between 1802 and 1803 she made one voyage as a slave ship. She was captured off West Africa around late 1804 before she could start gathering slaves on her second voyage.
- Active (1793 ship) was a snow launched in New Brunswick in 1789, possibly under another name. From 1793 she traded as a West Indiaman, sailing between Bristol and Jamaica until early in 1795 a French privateer captured and sank her.
- Active (1799 ship) was built in Bristol in 1799. She made one voyage as a slave ship in the triangular trade in enslaved persons, and then two voyages trading between Bristol and Africa. A French privateer captured her but a Guernsey privateer recaptured her. She then became a West Indiaman. On 16 and 17 July 1808 she repelled a Spanish and a French privateer in two separate single-ship actions. In 1809 she underwent a maritime mishap. She was last listed in 1819.
- Active (1800 ship) was a French ship launched in 1793. She came into British hands circa 1799 as a prize. Peter Everitt Mestaer purchased her and named her Active. She made one voyage to India for the British East India Company, which held a monopoly at the time on trade between Great Britain and India or China. From 1802 she was a London-based merchantman, trading first with Hamburg and then more generally. She was last listed in 1815.
- Active (1801 whaler) was a French ship that came into British hands in 1800 as a prize. William Bennett purchased her and named her Active. He employed her as a whaler and she was lost in January 1803 at the start of her second whaling voyage.
- Active (1804 ship) was the French ship Alsace that the Royal Navy captured in 1803. William Bennett purchased her and named her Active, in place of the previous Active lost in January 1803. She then made one whaling voyage for him. Bennett sold her to Robins & Co., and she sailed between London and Buenos Aires. She then sailed on a second sealing voyage. She was lost in 1810 at Tasmania.
- Active (1850) was a ketch that was wrecked at the entrance of the Hunter River in New South Wales on 18 February 1852.
- Active (1877) was a ketch that was wrecked on 19 January 1898 on the Oyster Bank at the entrance of Newcastle Harbour, New South Wales, Australia. The wreck has not been located.
- Active (sternwheeler), a steamboat that operated on the Willamette River, in Oregon, US, from 1865 to 1872
- Active (1852 ship) – a steam-powered whaling ship in the Dundee Whaling Expedition (1892–1893)

== See also ==
- HMS Active – one of 12 vessels
- Hired armed cutter Active – one of two vessels
- USCGC Active – one of two vessels
- USRC Active – one of five vessels
  - USCS Active was a sidewheel steamer that served the United States Coast Survey from 1852 to 1861.
- USS Active – one of five vessels
