= Active =

Active may refer to:

== Music ==
- Active (album), a 1992 album by Casiopea
- "Active" (song), a 2024 song by Asake and Travis Scott from Asake's album Lungu Boy
- Active Records, a record label

== Ships ==
- Active (ship), several commercial ships by that name
- HMS Active, the name of various ships of the British Royal Navy
- USCS Active, a US Coast Survey ship in commission from 1852 to 1861
- USCGC Active, the name of various ships of the US Coast Guard
- USRC Active, the name of various ships of the US Revenue Cutter Service
- USS Active, the name of various ships of the US Navy

== Computers and electronics ==
- Active Enterprises, a defunct video game developer
- Sky Active, the brand name for interactive features on Sky Digital available in the UK and Ireland
- Active (software), software used for open publishing by Indymedia; see Independent Media Center
- The "live" circuit of mains power in countries observing AS/NZS 3112 electrical standard

== Sciences ==
- Thermodynamic activity, measure of an effective concentration of a species in a mixture
- Activation, in chemistry the process whereby something is prepared for a subsequent reaction
- Active (pharmacology), the fraction of a dose of unchanged drug that reaches systemic circulation
- Active voice, in linguistics, the grammatical voice prevalent in many of the world's languages

== Other ==
- Active, Alabama, a community in the US
- Active, the original name of the early steam locomotive Locomotion No. 1
- "Actives", current members of fraternities and sororities
- Active living, a lifestyle characterized by frequent or various activities

== See also ==
- Activity (disambiguation)
- Passive (disambiguation)
