= James Alden Jr. =

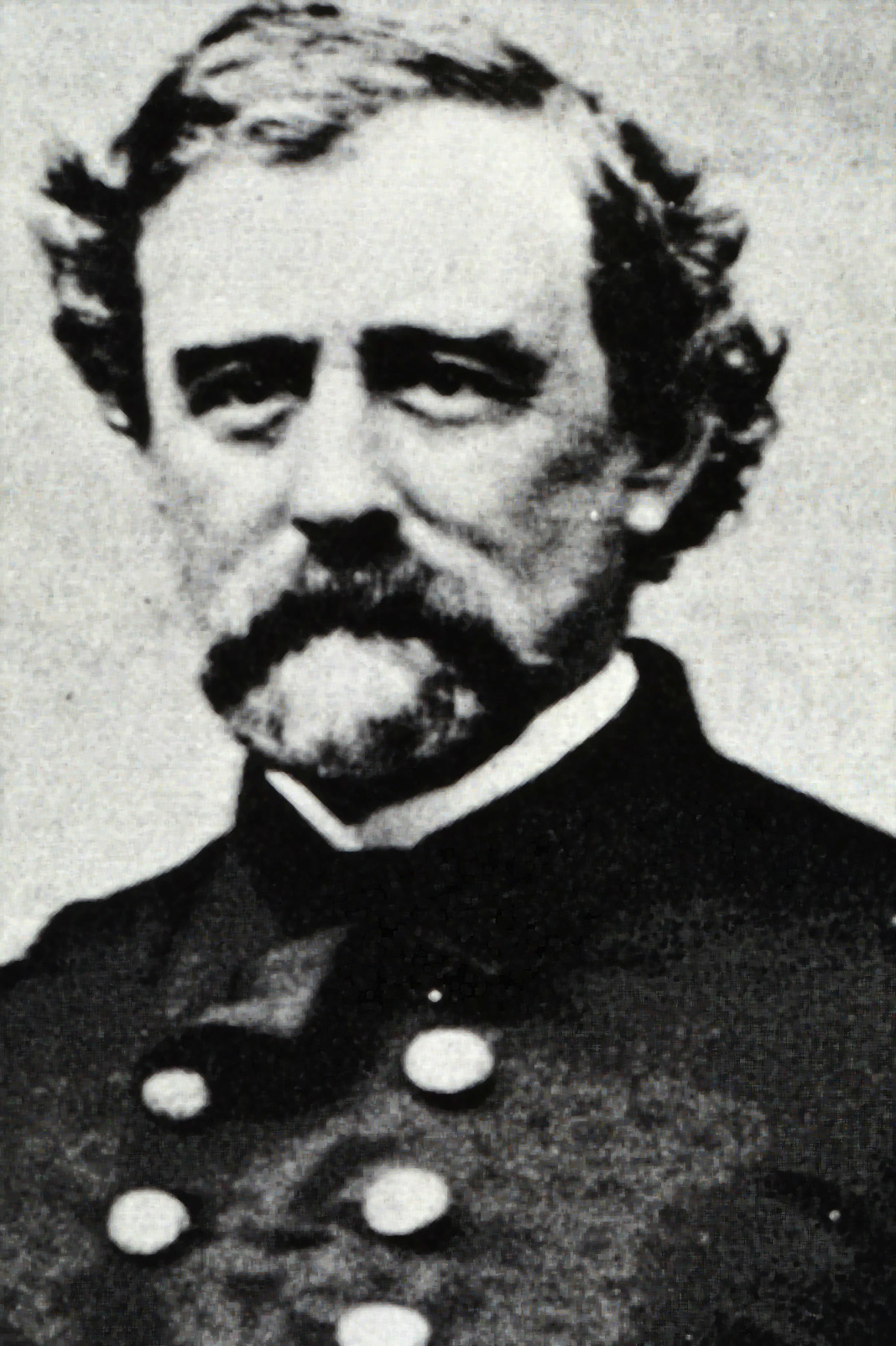
- Born: March 31, 1810; Portland, Maine, US
- Died: February 6, 1877 (aged 66); San Francisco, California, US
- Burial place: Eastern Cemetery, Portland, Maine
- Military career
- Allegiance: United States of America; Union
- Branch: United States Navy; Union Navy
- Service years: 1828–1873
- Rank: Rear admiral
- Conflicts: Mexican–American War; American Civil War

James Alden Jr. (March 31, 1810 – February 6, 1877) was a rear admiral in the United States Navy. In the Mexican–American War he participated in the captures of Veracruz, Tuxpan, and Tabasco. Fighting on the Union side in the Civil War, he took part in the relief of Fort Pickens, followed by many engagements on the Lower Mississippi, before being promoted captain of USS Brooklyn and assisting in the Union victory in the Battle of Mobile Bay.

== Early career ==
Alden was born in Portland, Maine, on March 31, 1810, and was a direct descendant of John Alden, a Mayflower pilgrim. He was appointed United States Navy as midshipman on April 1, 1828, and spent the initial years of his naval career ashore at the Naval Station in Boston, Massachusetts, before he served in the Mediterranean Squadron on board the sloop of war USS John Adams. Promoted to passed midshipman on June 14, 1834, Alden then served at the Boston Navy Yard until he was assigned to the United States Exploring Expedition under Lieutenant Charles Wilkes.

During the course of his first voyage (1838–1842), the officers and men of the expedition were transferred freely from one vessel to another; Alden, promoted to lieutenant on February 25, 1841, concluded the cruise as executive officer of the sloop USS Porpoise. He saw action at Malolo, in the Fiji Islands, on July 26, 1840, in the punitive expedition against the tribe which had murdered Lieutenant Joseph Underwood and Midshipman Wilkes Henry two days before. Henry was a nephew of the expedition's leader.

After another tour of duty at the naval station at Boston, Alden was assigned to USS Constitution, and circumnavigated the globe in the frigate during her cruise under Captain John ("Mad Jack") Percival. While serving therein, he commanded a boat expedition that cut out several war junks from under the guns of a fort at Zuron Bay, Cochin China. Later serving in the Home Squadron during the Mexican–American War (1846), Alden, an adept surveyor, participated in the captures of Veracruz, Tuxpan, and Tabasco.

== Coast Survey ==
Following the war with Mexico, Alden served as inspector of provisions and clothing at Boston until detached from this duty on May 18, 1849, to go to Washington, D.C., and report to the United States Secretary of the Treasury for duty with the United States Coast Survey. From the summer of 1849 to the late winter of 1851, he commanded, in succession, the U.S. Coast Survey steamers John Y. Mason and Walker in survey duty off the United States East Coast. Assigned to duty on the United States West Coast thereafter, Alden traveled to San Francisco, California, where he replaced William Pope McArthur as commander of the Coast Survey schooner Ewing. He arrived in May 1851 and surveyed from San Francisco to San Diego, reporting on the expedition from San Francisco on February 17, 1852.

=== Active ===
In 1852, he assumed command of the Coast Survey steamer Active, purchased to replace the wrecked Jefferson (the Ewing was temporarily abandoned,) and carried out survey work off the United States West Coast into 1860. During this time, on September 1, 1855, he was promoted to commander. Indian disturbances in Washington Territory in January 1856 highlighted Alden's tour of duty in command of Active, and his ship, joining the sloop-of-war USS Decatur and the steamer USS Massachusetts, proved "of great service" during those troubled times. Active operated in the headwaters of Puget Sound, where her presence reassured the settlers. In the summer of 1859, during tensions incident to an American's killing a Britisher's pig on San Juan Island, Active's timely arrival at that isle apparently helped to quiet a potentially dangerous situation in what became later known as the "Pig War."

== U.S. Civil War ==
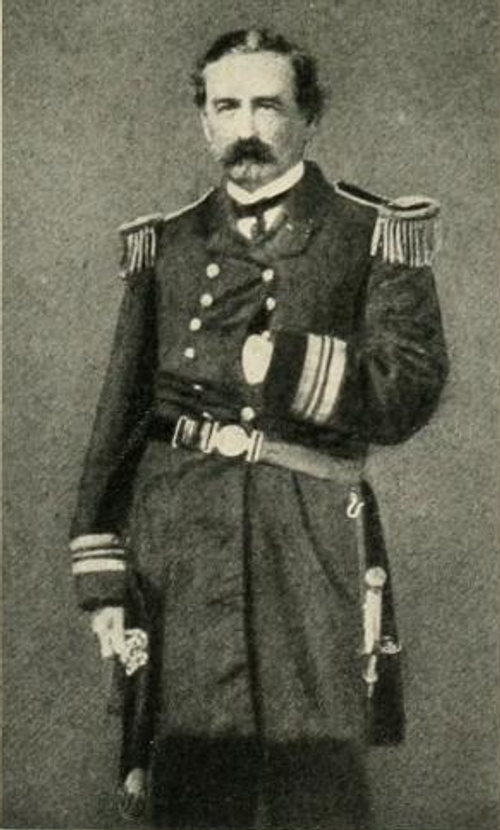
James Alden Jr.

The outbreak of the American Civil War in the spring of 1861 found Alden in command of the steamer USS South Carolina, in which he participated in the relief of Fort Pickens. Next given the steam sloop USS Richmond, Alden commanded her in the passage of Fort Jackson and Fort St. Philip, and in the engagements with Confederate batteries at Chalmette, Louisiana, twice passing the southern guns at Vicksburg, Mississippi, and in the battle at Port Hudson, Louisiana.

Promoted to captain on January 2, 1863, Alden next assumed command of the steam sloop USS Brooklyn, and led that ship in the action with Fort Gaines and Fort Morgan and with the Confederate gunboats in the Battle of Mobile Bay. While Brooklyn was being sent north for repairs, she was attached to the naval forces gathering off Fort Fisher, North Carolina, and took part in both assaults on that Confederate bastion.

In November 1865, shortly after the war's conclusion, Alden was elected as a veteran companion of the Pennsylvania Commandery of the Military Order of the Loyal Legion of the United States. He was assigned insignia number 64.

== Promotion and late career ==
Promoted to commodore on July 25, 1866, Alden, over the next two years, commanded, in succession, the steam sloop USS Susquehanna and the steam frigate USS Minnesota before he was made commandant of the Mare Island Navy Yard. Appointed Chief of the Bureau of Navigation in April 1869 and promoted to rear admiral on June 19, 1871, Alden returned to sea in 1871 with orders to command the naval force on the European Station.

Departing New York in his flagship, USS Wabash, on November 17, 1871, Alden relieved rear admiral Charles S. Boggs at Villefranche, France, on January 1, 1872. Although placed on the retired list on March 31, 1872, Alden remained on active duty commanding the European Fleet until relieved by Rear Admiral A. Ludlow Case at Villefranche on June 2, 1873. His last tour of duty afloat completed, he sailed home in his former command, Brooklyn.

Alden died at San Francisco on February 6, 1877, but was buried in his native Portland's Eastern Cemetery on February 24, 1877.

== Namesake ==
The U.S. Navy destroyer USS Alden was named for him.
