= John King (missionary) =

English missionary (1787–1854)

- Born: 1787; Swerford, Oxfordshire, England
- Died: 6 May 1854 (aged 67); Te Puna, Bay of Islands, Colony of New Zealand

John King (1787–1854) was an English-born missionary. He was a prominent member of the Church Missionary Society in New Zealand. He and his wife, Hannah King, were one of the three artisan missionary couples who accompanied Samuel Marsden on his first voyage to New Zealand aboard the missionary brig Active.

== Biography ==
John King was born in Swerford in 1787 and was brought up as a shoemaker. He was present in this role at Nether Worton when Samuel Marsden visited England in 1809 to search for artisans to take part in the first mission to New Zealand. King was appointed by Marsden and given training in flax weaving and twine spinning, with the intention that these skills would be introduced to Māori. In September 1809, Marsden and King departed England for Australia, alongside fellow artisan William Hall, and his wife Dinah. Marsden was to stay in Australia whilst King and the Halls intended to travel through to New Zealand. However, news of the Boyd Massacre reached Australia and King and the Halls stayed with Marsden at Parramatta.

On 10 November 1812, King married Hannah Hansen, daughter of Thomas Hansen, at St John's Church, Parramatta. Marsden was the officiating clergyman, and the ceremony was witnessed by Dinah Hall and Thomas Hansen. King and his wife later had 12 children, including Philip Hansen King (1813–1880), and Jane Davis (died 1894), third wife of Richard Davis.

In December 1814, Marsden arrived in New Zealand with his three missionaries, King, William Hall, and Thomas Kendall. They settled at Hohi, and later Te Puna.

On Marsden's journey to New Zealand, they were accompanied by Ruatara, who later invited the missionaries to his home at Rangihoua, where King witnessed Marsden's Christmas Day sermon at Oihi Bay; the first Christian service in New Zealand.

King was to act as a district catechist and teach the Māori people agriculture. Whilst he and Kendall travelled together and became the first whites to visit Hokianga, King's relations with his fellow missionary were not pleasant.

He died in Te Puna on 6 May 1854, at the age of 67. His wife, Hannah, had died three years prior on 27 November 1851. They were the only missionary couple from this first settlement that had remained in New Zealand for the rest of their lives.
