= USS Jefferson =

USS Jefferson may refer to the following ships operated by the United States:

- USRC Jefferson (1802), a revenue cutter that served from 1802 until 1817
- USS Jefferson (1814), brig that served from 1814 until 1825
- USRC Jefferson (1832), a revenue cutter that served from 1833 until 1847; her named was changed to Crawford in 1839
- USRC Jefferson (1845), a revenue cutter that was transferred to the US Coastal Survey in 1848 and wrecked in Patagonia in 1851

== See also ==
- USS Jefferson City
- USS Jefferson County
- USS Thomas Jefferson
