= Passive =

Passive may refer to:

- Passive voice, a grammatical voice common in many languages, see also Pseudopassive
- Passive language, a language from which an interpreter works
- Passivity (behavior), the condition of submitting to the influence of one's superior
- Passive-aggressive behavior, resistance to following through with expectations in interpersonal or occupational situations
- Passive income, income resulting from cash flow received on a regular basis
- Passive immunity, the transfer of active humoral immunity
- Passive experience, observation lacking reciprocal interaction; and wrought with delusion of control.

== Science and technology ==
- Passivation (chemistry), process of making a material "passive" in relation to another material prior to using the materials together
- Passivity (engineering) a property of engineering systems, particularly in analog electronics and control systems
- Passive solar building design, which uses (or avoids) sunlight as an energy source without active mechanical systems
- Passive house, a standard for energy efficiency in buildings
- Passive mode, in regard to how a data connection is established in File Transfer Protocol

== Entertainment ==
- "Passive" (song), by A Perfect Circle

== See also ==
- Active (disambiguation)
- Vicarious (disambiguation)
- Surrogate (disambiguation)
