= Vicarious =

Vicarious may refer to:

- Vicariousness, experiencing through another person
- Vicarious learning, observational learning

== In law ==
- Vicarious liability, a term in common law
- Vicarious liability (criminal), a term in criminal law

== Religion ==
- Vicarious atonement, Christian doctrine
- Vicarious baptism, baptism for the dead

== Science and technology ==
- Vicarious (company), an artificial intelligence company
- Vicarious Visions, a video game developer
- Vicarious problem-solving, a rational approach to economic theory
- Vicarious traumatization, transformation in the self of a trauma worker or helper that results from empathic engagement with traumatized clients and their reports of traumatic experiences.

== Entertainment ==
- "Vicarious," a song by Cadence Weapon from the album Breaking Kayfabe
- Vicarious (album), an album by New Zealand band Strawpeople
- Vicarious (song), a single by the progressive metal band Tool

== See also ==
- Proxy (disambiguation)
- Surrogate (disambiguation)
- Passive (disambiguation)
- Avatar (disambiguation)
