= Proxy =

Proxy or proxies may refer to:

== Arts, entertainment and media ==
=== Fictional entities ===
- Proxy, a mysterious humanoid lifeform in the anime Ergo Proxy
- PROXY, a holodroid featured in Star Wars: The Force Unleashed
- Proxy, the codename of Wendy Harris, a fictional character in the Batgirl comic book series
- "Proxy", the name of a fictional character in the 2012 horror film Smiley
- "Proxy", a term, specifically (but not limited to) in Slender: The Arrival, for a person who is influenced or controlled by the Slender Man
- Proxy, playable main protagonist in Zenless Zone Zero.

=== Music ===
- Proxies (band), British electronic rock band formed in 2010
- Proxie (Thai band), Thai boy band formed in 2022
- "Proxy" (song), a 2014 song by Martin Garrix
- "The Proxy", a song by RJD2 on his 2002 album Deadringer

=== Other uses in arts, entertainment and media ===
- Proxy (film), a 2013 horror film directed by Zack Parker
- Proxies (film), a 1921 silent drama film directed by George D. Baker
- The Proxy, a drama web series starring Stuart Ashen
- Proxy card, a substitute card used in trading card games when a player does not own the substituted card and also can occur when proxy cards are not tradeable
- Proxy (novel), a 2013 young adult novel by Alex London

== Computing and technology ==
- Proxy pattern, a software design pattern in computer programming, also known as a proxy class
- Proxy server, a computer network service that allows clients to make indirect network connections to other network services

== Politics ==
- Proxy politics, a form of politics conducted through proxy political actors
- Proxy political party, a political party created and controlled by another political subject
- Proxy voting, a vote cast on behalf of an absent person
- Proxy war, a war where two powers use third parties as a substitute for fighting each other directly

== Other uses ==
- Proxy or agent (law), a substitute authorized to act for another entity or a document which authorizes the agent so to act
- Proxy (climate), a measured variable used to infer the value of a variable of interest in climate research
- Proxy (statistics), a measured variable used to infer the value of a variable of interest
- Healthcare proxy, a document used to specify an agent to make medical decisions for a patient in case they are incapacitated
- Proxy fight, attempting to influence how company shareholders use their proxy votes
- Proxy marriage, common amongst European monarchs, where one party is not present in person to their marriage to the other
- Proxy murder, a murder committed on behalf of somebody else
- Proxy statement, information published related to a U.S. stockholders' meeting
- ProxyAddress, a service providing postal addresses for homeless people

== See also ==
- Münchausen syndrome by proxy
- Proxi, a computer application
- Vicarious (disambiguation)
