= Activity =

Activity may refer to:

- Action (philosophy), in general
- Human activity: human behavior, in sociology behavior may refer to all basic human actions, economics may study human economic activities and along with cybernetics and psychology may study their modulation
- In Semantics, a type of Aktionsart
- Recreation, or activities of leisure
- The Aristotelian concept of energeia, Latinized as actus
- Activity (UML), a major task in Unified Modeling Language
- Activity, the rate of catalytic activity, such as enzyme activity (enzyme assay), in physical chemistry and enzymology
- Thermodynamic activity, the effective concentration of a solute for the purposes of mass action
- Activity (project management)
- Total activity, the number of radioactive decays per second
- Activity (software engineering)
- Activity (soil mechanics)
- HMS Activity (D94), an aircraft carrier of the Royal Navy
- "Activity", a song by Way Out West from Intensify
- Cultural activities, activities referred to culture.

== See also ==
- Activity theory, a learning theory in education
- Social activity (disambiguation), several concepts in the social sciences
- Activiti (software), an open source Business Process Management platform
- Active (disambiguation)
