= William Hall (missionary) =

English missionary (1778–1844)

- Born: 1778; Carlisle, England
- Died: 6 March 1844 (aged 65–66); Sackville, New South Wales, Australia
- Burial place: St John's Cemetery, Parramatta, New South Wales
- Occupations: Carpenter; Missionary; Farmer

William Hall (1778 – 6 March 1844) was an English lay person for the Church Mission Society (CMS) and was involved in the establishment of the first CMS station in New Zealand at Oihi Bay, part of the larger Rangihoua Bay in the Bay of Islands. Born in Carlisle, he traveled to Australia with Samuel Marsden in 1809 and five years later came to New Zealand aboard the ship Active. Trained as a carpenter and shipbuilder he constructed several buildings at Oihi Bay and then in Kerikeri, where another CMS mission was established in 1819. He worked with the CMS until 1825, when he resigned and returned to Australia. He took up farming in New South Wales and died in 1844.

== Early life ==
Born in 1778 at Carlisle in England, William Hall joined the Church Missionary Society (CMS) aged about 30–31 as a lay missionary. Not ordained as a priest, a lay missionary was instead a tradesman and expected to perform manual labour as their mission work. Hall trained in carpentry and shipbuilding in Hull before proceeding to New South Wales in Australia with his wife in 1809. Together with their families, he was accompanying John King, a fellow lay missionary, and Samuel Marsden, the senior chaplain of New South Wales, who had secured permission to establish a CMS mission in New Zealand, among the Māori of the Bay of Islands. However, the sinking of the Boyd at Whangaroa Harbour and the murder of its crew and most of its passengers by Māori of Ngāpuhi caused Marsden to postpone his plans. In the interim, Hall worked as a carpenter in New South Wales.

== Missionary work ==
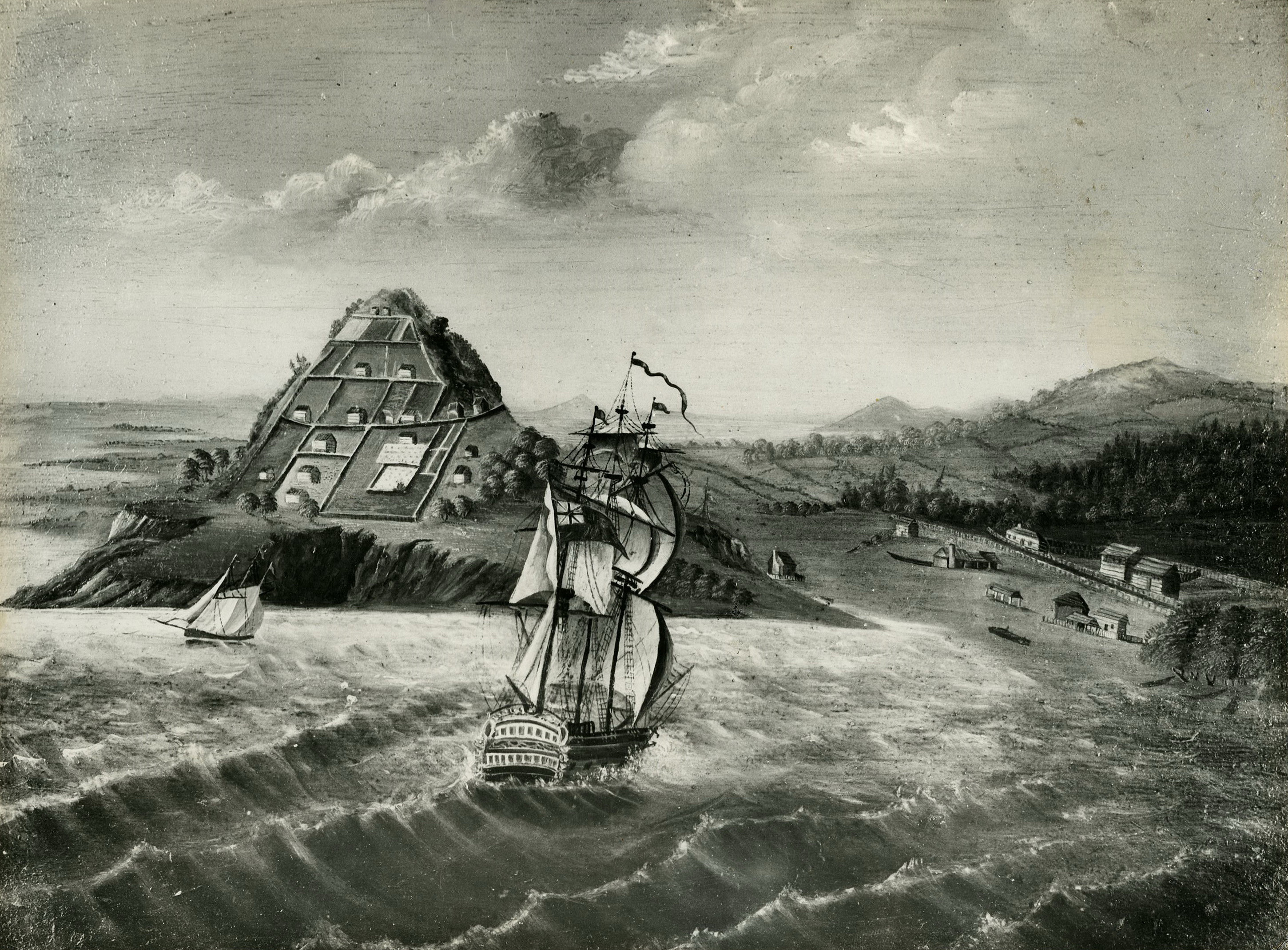
A painting by an unknown artist of the CMS mission at Oihi Bay, Bay of Islands

In 1814, Marsden was able to secure permission from the authorities in New South Wales to proceed with his plans, subject to the safe return of his ship, the Active, from the Bay of Islands. Hall and Thomas Kendall, another lay missionary who was trained as school teacher, duly arrived at the Bay of Islands on 10 June and spent six weeks there. At the end the year Marsden arrived and performed the first Christian service in New Zealand at the site of what became the Oihi Mission Station. Marsden established this in early 1815 at Rangihoua Bay on land that had been purchased with the consent of Ruatara, a rangatira (chief) in the area. Some 30 Europeans, including Hall, King and Kendall and their families among them, lived at the mission. Hall briefly moved away and set himself up as a farmer at Waitangi but within a few months came into conflict with the local Māori and after being physically attacked, he returned to Oihi.

Hall constructed buildings for the community but tensions soon arose between him and Kendall; the former sought to establish a trading business of which the latter disapproved. Hall was the only CMS worker to not rule out the trade of muskets, with Māori keen to purchase weapons for use in tribal conflicts. In the meantime the mission struggled to flourish. Conversion of Māori to Christianity was unsuccessful with no baptisms during the course of the duration of the mission at Oihi.

Influenced by the powerful rangatira Hongi Hika, in 1819, Marsden set up a new mission in the Bay of Islands with Hall going with him to select the 13,000 acre site, purchased for 48 axes and some gunpowder. The site was at Kerikeri and would become the major CMS mission in the area. Hall built a punt to transport supplies and materials from Oihi. He also built the store at Kerikeri and several houses, including one nearby for Hika although this was not finished until 1824. A chapel and school were constructed the same year. Local historian Kath Hansen notes that Hall was likely New Zealand's first resident boatbuilder. As well as the punt he built in 1819, he built a 24-foot boat for his own usage and then constructed much of the Herald, which was launched in January 1826.

== Later life ==
In 1825, Hall resigned from the mission and returned to New South Wales with his family. He built a house for his family in Sydney, at the corner of Liverpool and Upper Pitt Streets, but this was subsequently rented to John Busby, the father of the future British Resident James Busby. Hall moved to Parramatta to work at Marsden's mission there, teaching at its seminary. In late 1826, Hall moved again to Blacktown, where he managed a church-based school for Aboriginal children for three years. He also served as a catechist to various sheep shearing gangs in the region and from 1829 took up farming although his health soon began to decline. Despite this, he purchased a plot of nearly 1,300 acres of bush, at Sackville, in 1837 although he had to hire a manager to convert it to farmland and run the property. The house he had built there in 1839, Stannix Park House, is a heritage listing managed by the Heritage Council of New South Wales.

Hall died on 6 March 1844, survived by his wife and three children. A fourth child, his first son, had predeceased him. He is buried in St John's Cemetery at Parramatta. His wife, Dinah, died in 1855 and is buried alongside him.
