= Woodlake, California =

City in California, United States

- City
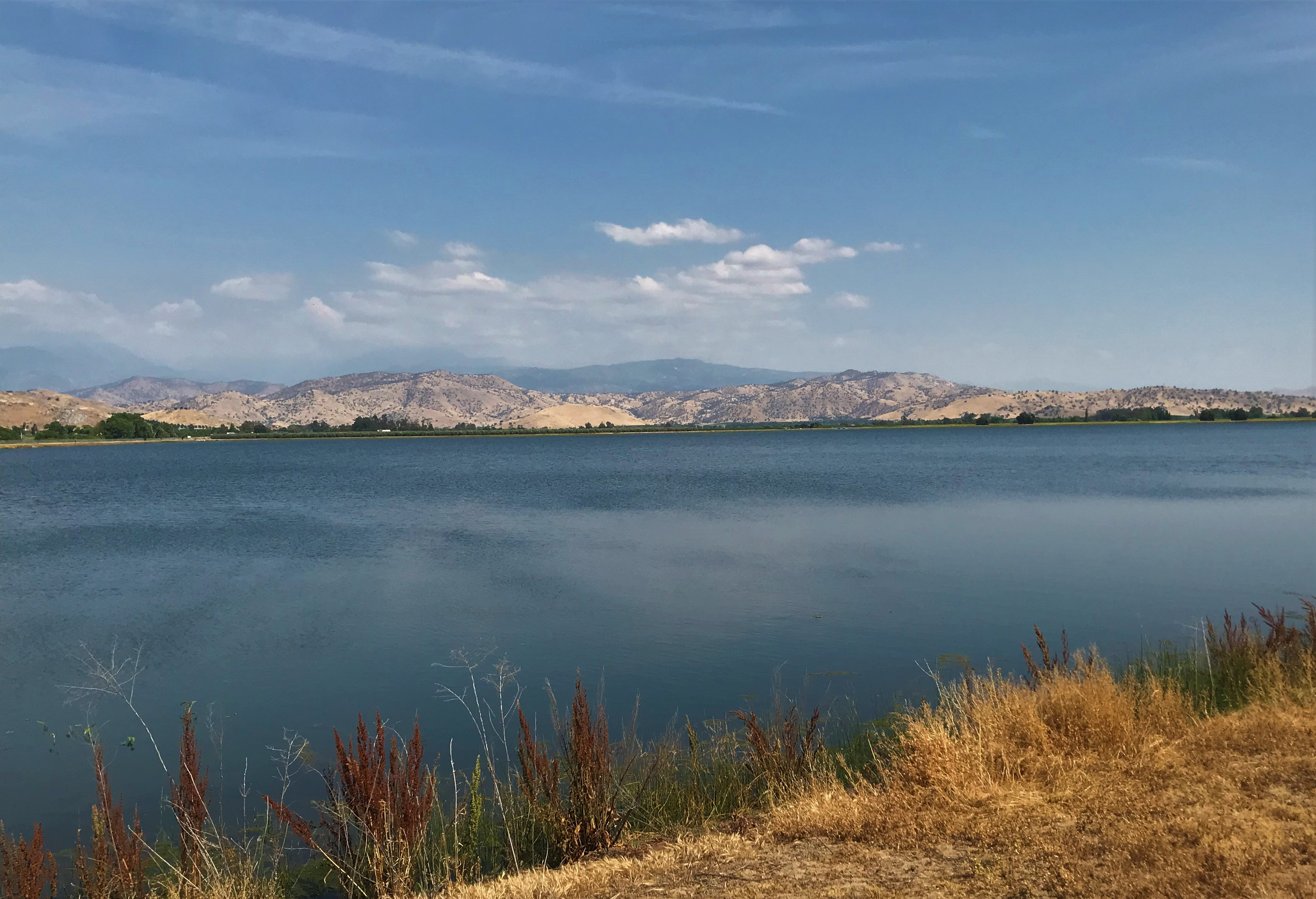
- Bravo Lake
- Interactive map of Woodlake, California
- Location in the United States
- Coordinates: 36°24′59″N 119°5′58″W
- Country: United States
- State: California
- County: Tulare
- Incorporated: September 23, 1941

Government
  - Type: Mayor
  - Mayor: Rudy Mendoza

Area
  - Total: 3.07 sq mi (7.95 km^{2})
  - Land: 2.61 sq mi (6.77 km^{2})
  - Water: 0.46 sq mi (1.18 km^{2}) 14.83%
- Elevation: 440 ft (134 m)

Population (2020)
  - Total: 7,419
  - Density: 2,838/sq mi (1,095.8/km^{2})
- Time zone: UTC-8 (Pacific (PST))
  - Summer (DST): UTC-7 (PDT)
- ZIP code: 93286
- Area code: 559
- FIPS code: 06-86300
- GNIS feature ID: 0251787
- Website: www.cityofwoodlake.com

Woodlake is a incorporated city in Tulare County, California, United States. It is situated in the San Joaquin Valley near the foothills of the Sierra Nevada. The population was 7,419 at the 2020 census, up from 7,279 at the 2010 census. In 1912, the city of Woodlake was founded by Gilbert F. Stevenson, who bought 13,000 acres (5,300 ha) of land to build citrus orchards and a developed community.

== Geography ==
According to the United States Census Bureau, the city has a total area of 3.1 square miles (8.0 km^{2}), of which 2.6 square miles (6.7 km^{2}) is land and 0.5 square miles (1.3 km^{2}) (14.83%) is water. It is situated in Central California and is 22 miles northeast of Visalia. To the southeast sits Bravo Lake, a 13 acre lake which offers birdwatching along with walking paths. Woodlake is also a short drive from Sequoia National Park.

=== Climate ===
According to the Köppen Climate Classification system, Woodlake has a semi-arid climate, abbreviated "BSK" on climate maps. As a result of its mild climate, Woodlake is a popular destination for activities such as hiking, biking, swimming, and camping. As for rain, Woodlake on average gets 13 inches of rainfall per year, though it gets no snow.

== Demographics ==
Historical population
Census	Pop.	Note	%±
1940	1,146		—
1950	2,525		120.3%
1960	2,623		3.9%
1970	3,371		28.5%
1980	4,343		28.8%
1990	5,678		30.7%
2000	6,651		17.1%
2010	7,279		9.4%
2020	7,419		1.9%
U.S. Decennial Census

=== 2020 census ===
As of the 2020 census, Woodlake had a population of 7,419 and a population density of 2,838.2 inhabitants per square mile (1,095.8/km^{2}).

The age distribution was 31.7% under the age of 18, 10.6% aged 18 to 24, 25.0% aged 25 to 44, 21.6% aged 45 to 64, and 11.1% who were 65 years of age or older. The median age was 30.2 years. For every 100 females there were 98.1 males, and for every 100 females age 18 and over there were 99.0 males age 18 and over.

The whole population lived in households. There were 2,137 households, out of which 52.5% included children under the age of 18. Of all households, 47.6% were married-couple households, 7.4% were cohabiting couple households, 28.0% had a female householder with no partner present, and 17.0% had a male householder with no partner present. 14.7% of households were one person, and 6.2% were one person aged 65 or older. The average household size was 3.47, and there were 1,736 families (81.2% of all households).

There were 2,236 housing units at an average density of 855.4 units per square mile (330.3 units/km^{2}), of which 2,137 (95.6%) were occupied and 99 (4.4%) were vacant. Of occupied units, 50.7% were owner-occupied and 49.3% were occupied by renters. The homeowner vacancy rate was 1.2% and the rental vacancy rate was 2.6%.

98.4% of residents lived in urban areas, while 1.6% lived in rural areas.

Racial composition as of the 2020 census
Race	Number	Percent
White	2,081	28.0%
Black or African American	52	0.7%
American Indian and Alaska Native	159	2.1%
Asian	68	0.9%
Native Hawaiian and Other Pacific Islander	3	0.0%
Some other race	3,457	46.6%
Two or more races	1,599	21.6%
Hispanic or Latino (of any race)	6,535	88.1%

=== Demographic estimates ===
In 2023, the US Census Bureau estimated that 32.9% of the population were foreign-born. Of all people aged 5 or older, 22.6% spoke only English at home, 77.3% spoke Spanish, and 0.2% spoke Asian or Pacific Islander languages. Of those aged 25 or older, 55.0% were high school graduates and 10.9% had a bachelor's degree.

=== Income ===
The median household income was $46,607, and the per capita income was $17,604. About 19.8% of families and 21.2% of the population were below the poverty line.

== Economy ==
In 2017, the city approved two companies’ cannabis dispensary proposals in hopes of generating tax revenue for the public service budget. In the wood industry, companies such as Sierra Pacific Industries play a major role in Woodlake's economy along with being a major company in the region.

== Government ==
The community of Woodlake is serviced by its own municipal police department. The police services building is adjacent to the City Hall complex on Valencia Boulevard.

In the state legislature Woodlake is located in the 16th senatorial district, represented by Democrat Melissa Hurtado, and in the 33rd Assembly district, represented by Republican Alexandra Macedo. In the United States House of Representatives, Woodlake is in California's 21st congressional district, represented by Democrat Jim Costa.

== Education ==
The city is served by the Woodlake Unified School District for grades PK-12.

The schools include Woodlake High School, Woodlake Valley Middle School, Castle Rock Elementary School, F.J. White Elementary. Woodlake high school consists of grades 9–12. Woodlake Valley Middle School consists of grades 6–8. Castle Rock Elementary School consists of grades 3–5. F.J. White Elementary consists of grades K-2. Woodlake High School provides an anonymous tip line to help ensure the safety of their students. This tip line can consist of bullying, threats, suspicious activity, etc.
