= USS Active =

USS Active may refer to the following ships of the United States Navy:

- USS Active (1779), a brigantine-rigged packet launched in 1779 and captured by the British man-of-war HMS Proserpine on 23 March 1782.
- USS Active (1837), a schooner purchased in 1837 and sold in 1838.
- USS Active (1888), a harbor tug launched in 1888, sunk in 1926, then raised and sold in 1929.
- USS Active (1917), a motorboat that came under Navy control in April 1917.
- USS Active (YT-112), a harbor tug acquired by the Navy from the United States Shipping Board on 20 April 1925.

== See also ==
- USCS Active
- USRC Active
- USCGC Active
