= Pseudopassive =

Pseudopassive or pseudo-passive may refer to:

- Impersonal passive voice, a grammatical form that deletes the subject of an intransitive verb
- Prepositional passive, a form of English passive voice in which the object of a preposition becomes the subject of a clause

== See also ==
- Passive voice, a grammatical form in which an object becomes a subject
- Passive (disambiguation)
