= HMS Arab (1795) =

French ship

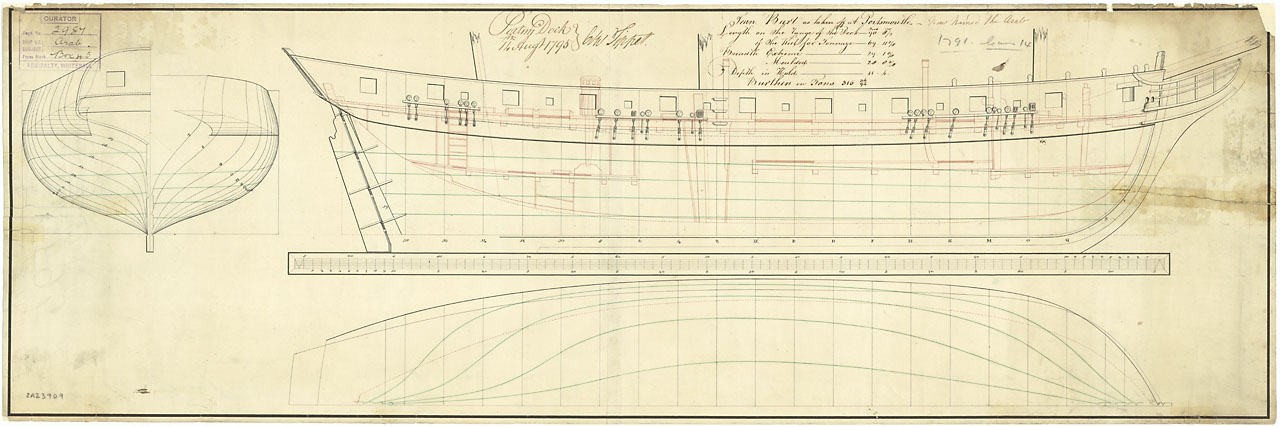
- Plan of the Jean Bart taken in 1795 at Portsmouth

History

France
- Name: Jean Bart
- Laid down: April 1793 at Saint Malo
- Launched: October 1793
- Captured: 29 March 1795

Great Britain
- Name: HMS Arab
- Acquired: 29 March 1795
- Commissioned: October 1795
- Fate: Wrecked, 10 June 1796

General characteristics
- Class & type: Révolutionnaire-class corvette
- Displacement: 420 tons (French)
- Tons burthen: 31534/94 (bm)
- Length: 90 ft 8 1/2 in (27.6 m) (overall); 69 ft 11 3/8 in (21.3 m) (keel)
- Beam: 29 ft 1 3/8 in (8.9 m)
- Depth of hold: 11 ft 4 in (3.5 m)
- Complement: French service:136; British service:100
- Armament: French service: 18 × 6-pounder guns; British service: 16 × 6-pounder guns

HMS Arab was the French 20-gun corvette Jean Bart, launched in 1793. The British captured her in 1795 and the Royal Navy took her into service. She was wrecked in 1796.

== French service and capture ==
Jean Bart was built to a design by Pierre Duhamel; she was due to be renamed Installée in May 1795, but was captured before that could happen. She cruised the Channel, the North Sea, and the Atlantic as far as New York.

In 1795 Jean Bart was under the command of Lieutenant de vaisseau Néel. In March she captured the West Indiaman Active as Active was sailing from Bristol to Jamaica. The French took Active's crew on board Jean Bart and then sank Active.

However, on 29 March 1795 Jean Bart encountered HMS Cerberus and Santa Margarita in the Channel. They captured Jean Bart, which accounts describe as having 18 guns and a crew of 110 men, or 20 guns and 120 men. Hannibal shared in the prize.

Jean Bart was sailing to Brest with dispatches from the French minister in the United States. In a deposition, Guillaume François Néel of Saint Malo testified that he had been the captain of Jean Bart at her capture, and that she had had 118 persons aboard, one of whom was an American; all the rest were French. Néel stated that he had thrown a packet containing the dispatches overboard but that it had floated rather than sunk, and that a boat from Cerberus had retrieved it.

The Admiralty took Jean Bart into the Royal Navy as HMS Arab. She was named and registered on 6 October 1795. Between July and December the Navy had her fitted at Portsmouth for £515. She was commissioned in October 1795 under Commander Stephen Seymour.

== British service and loss ==
Seymour sailed Arab for the Channel, where she joined the squadron under Sir John Borlase Warren. On 9 June 1796 she sighted a cutter and a brig and set off in pursuit, but lost them in the night. Next morning she sighted land, but before she could turn, she struck a rock near the Glénan islands. She could not pull herself off the reef before so much water had poured in that she had to be abandoned. Captain Seymour drowned as did others of her crew. In addition to Seymour, the sinking cost the lives of her surgeon and 20 seamen. The French captured the 80 or so survivors. The French exchanged the seven surviving officers, who arrived at Plymouth on 13 July 1796 on the cartel Displai.
