= Caleb Brewster =

American Revolutionary War spy

- Born: Caleb Brewster; September 12, 1747; Setauket, New York
- Died: February 13, 1827 (aged 79); Black Rock, Connecticut
- Burial place: Fairfield Cemetery, Fairfield, Connecticut
- Spouse: Anne Lewis
- Children: 8
- Espionage activity
- Allegiance: United States
- Service branch: Continental Army; U.S. Revenue-Marine
- Codename: 725

Caleb Brewster (September 12, 1747 – February 13, 1827) was an officer in the Continental Army and member of the Culper spy ring during the American Revolutionary War, reporting to General George Washington through Major Benjamin Tallmadge. He carried messages across Long Island Sound between Major Tallmadge and the ring's main spies on Long Island, New York, and in New York City. He also made direct reports to Washington concerning naval activities in the New York City area.

== Personal life ==
Brewster was born in Setauket, New York, a hamlet of Brookhaven. After the Revolutionary War, he was a blacksmith, an officer in the United States Revenue Cutter Service for 20 years, and a farmer. He was a descendant of Francis Brewster II, barber-surgeon of Castle Bristol, who died, presumably, on the Phantom Ship in 1646-1647 and was the son of Francis Brewster I of Wrentham Hall in Wrentham, Suffolk, yeoman, who died 1632 in Bristol, England. Additionally, he was a descendant of William Brewster who arrived on the Mayflower in 1620.

== Culper Ring ==
Major Benjamin Tallmadge convinced General George Washington on August 25, 1778, that Abraham Woodhull of Setauket, Long Island, would make a good agent to gather intelligence in New York City, the British Army's headquarters and base of operations during the American Revolutionary War. Woodhull and Robert Townsend were the main agents in the Ring, alias "Samuel Culper, Sr." and "Samuel Culper, Jr." respectively. Brewster was recruited to carry messages between Woodhull and Tallmadge, running regular trips in whaleboats across the Sound on a variety of smuggling and military missions.

Brewster agreed to command the boat service only under the condition that he be allowed to select his own boat crews. He chose several men from eastern Long island, including half-brothers David and Benjamin Dickerson who were on active duty in another command within the Continental Army. At one point, the Dickersons, along with several others of Brewster’s crew, were suddenly recalled to their original commands. General Washington stepped in personally to retrieve them via a personal note that highlights the importance of the operation: “To Brigadier General James Clinton, Headquarters, Nov 8, 1778, Dear Sir: I am informed by General Scott that some boatmen belonging to your brigade who were employed by Lt. Brewster in navigating from the main to L I have been remanded to their regiments, in consequence of which a service of a particular nature is very much impeded if not entirely stopped. The names of the men Gen. Scott tells me are David Dickinson, Focanah Hawkins, Benja. Dickinson, Jonathan Kinner & Joshua Davis. I beg that you will order them back to their late duty under a careful & attentive sergeant.”

Anna Strong's role in the Ring was to signal Brewster that a message was ready, according to widely accepted local and family tradition. She did this by hanging a black petticoat on her clothesline at Strong Point in Setauket, which Brewster could see from a boat in the Sound and Woodhull could see from his nearby farm. She would add several handkerchiefs for one of six coves where Brewster would bring his boat and Woodhull would meet him.

In February 1778, Brewster sent a message of his own through the Culper channel that described flat-bottomed boats being built in New York that could be used to ferry troops, and Loyalist privateers being outfitted. On another trip, he was waiting for Woodhull in Anna Strong's back garden when he surprised a passing British lieutenant. Brewster pulled him off his horse and had the opportunity to capture or kill him, but he refrained from doing either to avoid drawing suspicion on Anna as a member of the Ring, and instead pretended that he and his men were thieves.

== Other Military Service During the War ==
Brewster also participated in several military actions as a Continental Army officer serving under Tallmadge. In November 1780, Brewster secured vital intelligence from Woodhull detailing the limited provisions available to the Loyalist forces inside the Fort St. George, which guarded southern Long Island. On his way back to Connecticut to deliver the intelligence, Brewster captured a Loyalist ship and crew, delivering them under guard to New Haven. On November 23, Brewster took part in the successful Battle of Fort St. George, leading one of three assault forces under Tallmadge's command.

In February 1781, while on patrol off the coast of Connecticut, Brewster captured a Loyalist boat and its crew, which included several men who had previously been convicted by Patriot civil authorities for illegal trade with the British in New York City. Brewster noted that they had been sentenced to serve hard labor in the mines of Connecticut, but had escaped.

In December 1782, Brewster led a naval engagement against a group of armed British barges in Long Island Sound. Known as the "Spy Boat Fight," both sides engaged in hand-to-hand combat, and, in the course of the fighting, Brewster was shot in the chest. His wounds ended his active military service, and Brewster formally retired from military service in 1783. Years later, he applied to the federal government for pension relief, based on these injuries he sustained during the war.

In March 1783, despite his previously sustained wound, Brewster engaged the British ship Fox and captured the ship and crew without losing a man. The Captain of the Fox along with two other men died during the short battle.

== Revenue-Marine Service ==
In 1793, he joined the United States Revenue Cutter Service, predecessor of the United States Coast Guard. He took three years off from the service because he disagreed with policies of President John Adams, and he commanded the revenue cutter USRC Active (1812) from 1812 to 1816 during the War of 1812. He retired to his farm in Black Rock, Connecticut.

== After the war ==
Brewster married Anne Lewis in 1783 of Fairfield, Connecticut, after the war and moved to Fairfield with her, where he set up a blacksmith business. The couple had eight surviving children.

Brewster served as Sheriff of Suffolk County New York in 1810 and from 1812 to 1814.

Brewster died February 13, 1827, aged 79, and is buried in Fairfield Cemetery.

== In popular culture ==
Caleb Brewster is played by Daniel Henshall in the TV series Turn: Washington's Spies, on AMC.

== See also ==
- Intelligence in the American Revolutionary War
