= St John's Cemetery, Parramatta =

Cemetery in New South Wales, Australia

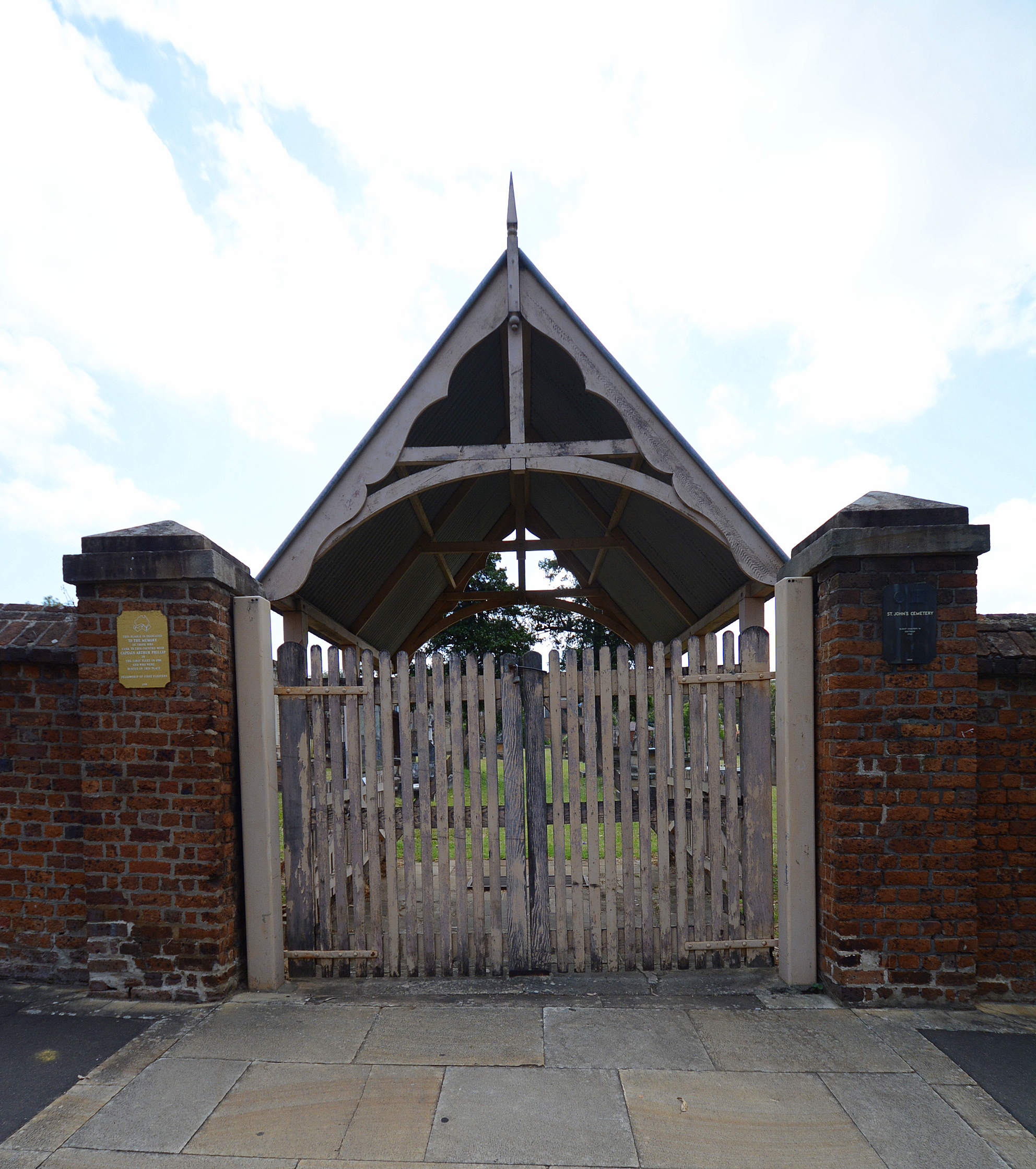

- Location within Sydney Location within Australia
- 33°49′01″S 150°59′54″E
- Location: 1 O'Connell Street, Parramatta, City of Parramatta, New South Wales, Australia

History
- Built: 1790–

Site notes
- Website: stjohnsonline.org

New South Wales Heritage Register
- Official name: St. John's Anglican Cemetery; First Fleet Cemetery; Saint Johns Cemetery; St Johns Cemetery
- Type: State heritage (complex / group)
- Designated: 2 April 1999
- Reference no.: 49
- Type: Cemetery/Graveyard/Burial Ground
- Category: Cemeteries and Burial Sites

St John's Cemetery, Parramatta, also known as St John's Anglican Cemetery, Saint John's Cemetery, and First Fleet Cemetery, is a heritage-listed cemetery at 1 O'Connell Street, Parramatta, City of Parramatta, New South Wales, Australia.

The cemetery is highly significant as it was established in 1790 as a general burial ground for all religious denominations making it the oldest surviving European cemetery in Australia. It is also significant for being the final resting place of many notables, including over 50 First Fleet graves and well known early European settlers, such as the Reverend Samuel Marsden, his wife Elizabeth, land holder D'Arcy Wentworth and family, land holders and farmers the Blaxland family, Charles Fraser, soldier and colonial botanist, who was appointed the first superintendent of the Sydney Botanic Garden by Governor Macquarie in 1816, and colonial bridge builder David Lennox.

It was only when cemeteries dedicated to specific religious denominations were progressively established in Parramatta in the mid-nineteenth century that St John's finally became an Anglican burial ground specifically. The historic cemetery was added to the New South Wales State Heritage Register on 2 April 1999.

== History ==
=== Pre-European History of the Site ===
The Indigenous people who inhabited the Parramatta River and its headwaters consisted of a number of clans, hordes or families known generally as the Darug Nation. At the head of the river were the Burramattagal clan (or Barramattagal) whose tribal lands included the area of the present day city of Parramatta. The country was highly suitable as a place to live with its ample fresh water, prolific plant and animal life and temperate climate.

European settlement of Parramatta dates from 2 November 1788 with Governor Phillip's settlement of convicts and soldiers at Rose Hill (on the south bank of the Parramatta River, within present day Parramatta Park) to clear and cultivate land to ensure food supplies for the infant penal colony. On 2 June 1791, to celebrate the birthday of King George III, Phillip named the Rose Hill settlement Parramatta, after the Barrumatta clan, noting that the name signified the "head of a river". While there seems to have been little conflict between the new settlers and the Indigenous inhabitants at this time in the Parramatta area (unlike Sydney Cove) the Barrumattagal clan were devastated by introduced European diseases, including the 1789 smallpox epidemic. By 1830 there were no known survivors of the Burramattagal clan (Kass, Liston, McClymont: 1996: 4–6, 14–16, 26; Parramatta Council riverside interpretation).

=== Establishment of the Burial Ground ===
Following European settlement in Parramatta, the site of present-day St John's Cemetery was used as an old stock paddock. A general burial ground was established on the site in 1790, the first interment, that of convicts' child James Magee, taking place on 31 January 1790. On the 28 January 1791, Governor Phillip's manservant and gardener Henry Edward Dodd was the first burial to be marked with a stone memorial. Dodd's grave is significant in its own right as being Australia's oldest surviving grave with headstone in situ and the site of the first public funeral in the colony.

== St. John's Online ==
St. John's Online (formerly St. John's Cemetery Project) launched in July 2015 as an online database for the St. John's parish register, including the people buried at and/or registered in the cemetery. The project has been funded by the Royal Australian Historical Society, the City of Parramatta Council in 2016, and the New South Wales Government through a Create NSW "Arts and Cultural Grant" between 2019 and 2021. In addition to parish data, the project features full-length biographies on notable "Old Parramattans" buried at the cemetery. These biographies, written by a team of historians, are being published gradually from 2016 onwards and feature stories of First Peoples as well as collections on St. John's First Fleeters, Second Fleeters, Third Fleeters, individuals associated with the Parramatta Female Factories, Wesleyans, Convict Constables, Rogues, colonial elites, colonial medical professionals, women, children, and early murder victims in the colony.

== Notable interments ==
- Samuel Marsden, Chief Cleric of the Colony of New South Wales
- William Hall, a lay worker of the Church Missionary Society
- David Lennox, master stonemason
- George Barrington
- Augustus Alt
- Henry Dodd
- William and Mary Batman, parents of John Batman
- Elizabeth Bourke, Wife of Governor Richard Bourke
- Lady FitzRoy, Daughter of Charles Lennox and Charlotte Gordon, and Wife of Governor Sir Charles Augustus FitzRoy
- John Harris, surgeon
- George Mealmaker
- D'Arcy Wentworth

=== St. John's First Fleeters ===
There are more than 50 people buried at the cemetery and/or registered in its burial register who arrived on the First Fleet, although most lie in unmarked graves. Those featured in the "St. John's First Fleeters" collection thus far include:

- Augustus Alt
- Simon Burn
- Frances Hannah Clements
- Thomas Daveney
- Henry Dodd
- Elizabeth Eccles (Elizabeth 'Winifred' Bird)
- Thomas Eccles
- Edward Elliott
- Thomas Freeman
- Deborah Herbert (Deborah Ellam)
- John Herbert
- Hugh Hughes
- John Irving
- Mary Kelly (Mary Dykes)
- David Killpack
- Isaac Knight
- John Martin
- Thomas Martin
- Jane McManus (Jane Poole)
- James Ogden
- Christopher Palmer
- John Palmer
- Richard Partridge
- Ann Smith
- James Wright

== The Friends of St. John's Cemetery, Parramatta ==
A new community group, Friends of St. John's Cemetery, Parramatta, formed on 25 June 2016 to conserve the graveyard, raise funds, and work towards National Heritage Listing.

== Description ==
The cemetery faces O'Connell Street on its eastern side, its only street access. It is surrounded by a high (c. 3m) wall of convict-made bricks with an angled "peak" top, constructed in 1820s AZP Cross Reference: PC 134.

A lych gate with roof frames the entry gates in the centre of the eastern wall.

The cemetery "floor" is grassed and almost devoid of trees. Three upright conifers – book leaf cypresses / Chinese arborvitae (Platycladus (syn. Thuja) orientalis) frame the central path – in what would have been two pairs.

To the south a large jacaranda (Jacaranda mimosifolia) tree and a mature bottlebrush (Callistemon sp.) are the only other trees.

The graves are arranged in rough "quarters" with a central path and perpendicular side paths.

A wide range of grave stones, table graves, and monuments mark the cemetery, from the very grand to the very modest. Some grave fencing survives around more grandiose monuments, but generally there is an absence of fencing.

The physical condition of the cemetery was assessed as reasonable, although some monuments are in poor condition, as at 17 June 2016. The archaeological potential was assessed as being high.

== Heritage listing ==
Association with notable events or people – containing First Fleet graves. Site possesses potential to contribute to an understanding early urban development in Parramatta and to an understanding of religious belief and burial customs in early NSW.

St John's Anglican Cemetery was listed on the New South Wales State Heritage Register on 2 April 1999 having satisfied the following criteria.

The place is important in demonstrating the course, or pattern, of cultural or natural history in New South Wales.

This item historically significant.

The place is important in demonstrating aesthetic characteristics and/or a high degree of creative or technical achievement in New South Wales.

This item is aesthetically significant.

The place has a strong or special association with a particular community or cultural group in New South Wales for social, cultural or spiritual reasons.

This item is socially significant.

The place has potential to yield information that will contribute to an understanding of the cultural or natural history of New South Wales.

This item is technically or scientifically significant.

== See also ==
- St John's Cathedral, Parramatta
