= Stannix Park House =

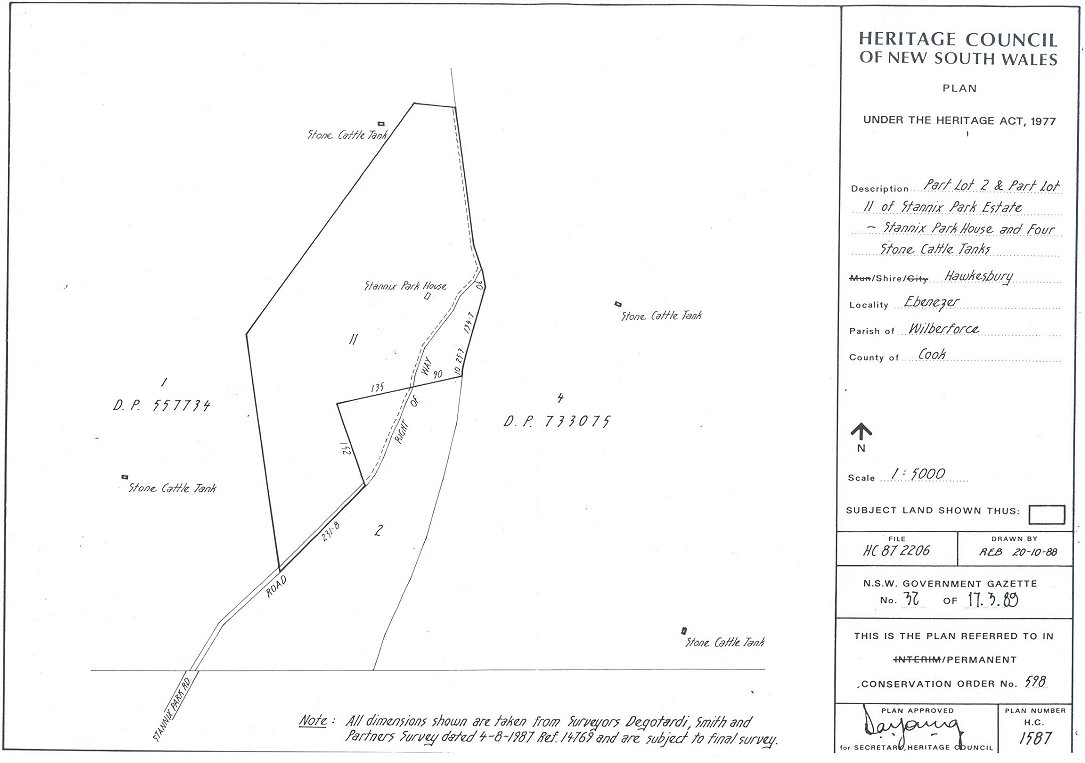
- Heritage boundaries

- Location within New South Wales Location within Australia
- 33.5148°S 150.8641°E
- Location: Stannix Park Lane, off Stannix Park Road, Wilberforce, City of Hawkesbury, New South Wales, Australia

History
- Built: 1839

New South Wales Heritage Register
- Official name: Stannix Park House, cattle tanks and site
- Type: state heritage (landscape)
- Designated: 2 April 1999
- Reference no.: 598
- Type: Homestead Complex
- Category: Farming and Grazing

Stannix Park House is a heritage-listed residence in Stannix Park Lane, off Stannix Park Road, Wilberforce, City of Hawkesbury, New South Wales, Australia. It was built in 1839. It was added to the New South Wales State Heritage Register on 2 April 1999.

== History ==
=== Indigenous occupation ===
The lower Hawkesbury was home to the Dharug people. The proximity to the Nepean River and South Creek qualifies it as a key area for food resources for indigenous groups. The Dharug and Darkinjung people called the river Deerubbin and it was a vital source of food and transport.

=== Non-indigenous occupation ===
Governor Arthur Phillip explored the local area in search of suitable agricultural land in 1789 and discovered and named the Hawkesbury River after Baron Hawkesbury. This region played a significant role in the early development of the colony with European settlers established here by 1794. Situated on fertile floodplains and well known for its abundant agriculture, Green Hills (as it was originally called) supported the colony through desperate times. However, frequent flooding meant that the farmers along the riverbanks were often ruined.

Governor Lachlan Macquarie replaced Governor Bligh, taking up duty on 1 January 1810. Under his influence the colony prospered. His vision was for a free community for white colonists, working in conjunction with the penal colony. He implemented an unrivalled public works program, completing 265 public buildings, establishing new public amenities and improving existing services such as roads. Under his leadership Hawkesbury district thrived. He visited the district on his first tour and recorded in his journal on 6 December 1810: "After dinner I christened the new townships...I gave the name of Windsor to the town intended to be erected in the district of the Green Hills...the township in the Richmond district I have named Richmond..." the district reminded Macquarie of those towns in England, whilst Castlereagh, Pitt Town and Wilberforce were named after English statesmen. These are often referred to as Macquarie's Five Towns. Their localities, chiefly Windsor and Richmond, became more permanent with streets, town square and public buildings.

Macquarie also appointed local men in positions of authority. In 1810 a group of settlers sent a letter to him congratulating him on his leadership and improvements. It was published in the Sydney Gazette with his reply. He was "much pleased with the sentiments" of the letter and assured them that the Haweksbury would "always be an object of the greatest interest" to him.

In marking out the towns of Windsor and Richmond in 1810, Governor Macquarie was acting on instructions from London. All of the governors who held office between 1789 and 1822, from Phillip to Brisbane, received the same Letter of Instruction regarding the disposal of the "waste lands of the Crown" that Britain claimed as her own. This included directives for the formation of towns and thus the extension of British civilisation to its Antipodean outpost.

=== Stannix Park ===
The house is in the Dharug region and there is extensive evidence of Aboriginal occupation on the site. Large numbers of axe and spear rubbings are present on exposed rocks and archaeologists estimate that the site had been used for about 2000 years. Artefacts are common and a fine stone axe was found within 30m of the house in late 1986. A "canoe" tree is still growing about 100m from the house.

Stannix Park was built in 1839 on a 1820-acre (736ha) grant made to settler, William Hall in 1837. Hall had first come to Australia in 1810 as a missionary aide to Samuel Marsden but went to New Zealand soon afterwards. His health forced him to return to Australia in 1825 and he sought a suitable grant for a growing herd of cattle, with his wife Dinah. His early applications were refused because of official confusion with a second William Hall who lived nearby at Pitt Town.

The matter was eventually resolved and Hall was given authorized possession in 1829. At that time he was in charge of the Aboriginal school and mission at Blacktown, but by 1831 he had prospered to such an extent that he had a large house in Sydney on the corner of Pitt Street and Liverpool Street, another at Blacktown and 161 horned cattle. He stated that it was his "intention to engage a free person of good character to take charge of the grant" but by 1839 when the house was finished he had transferred his grant to his son Henry Hall. The initials of the latter and the date are expertly carved on the keystone over the arched door to the coach house.

During the depression of the 1840s the house was heavily mortgaged to Thomas Tebbutt (the uncle of the astronomer John Tebbutt of Windsor) and others.

Following Hall's death in 1844 the property was sold.

By 1851 it had come into the possession of Matthew Everingham III whose father had born in the colony in 1795 as the son of two first fleet convicts. His wife Sophia Arndell was a descendant of first fleet surgeon Thomas Arndell of Caddy Park. Everingham held the property until 1867 and his father was rescued by boat from the first floor during the great flood of that year. Other flood markings and records indicate that the water was 4.69 metres deep inside the building.

The new owner was Peter De Rome, a young man who had made a fortune on the Araluen gold field. After his death in 1899 his wife, Amelia, continued to live in Stannix Park until 1906 when the property was subdivided into small lots (approximately 50 acres each) and sold. A succession of absentee landlords followed, and the house gradually fell into disrepair. It was bought in 1978 by a Mr R. Bennet who fitted a new roof before giving up the property.

The 46-acre site and house were bought by Max and Lorna Hatherly in August 1983. It was a ruin. The home had not been lived in for 40 years prior and was in poor shape, with little but the structure intact. Architects Ian Stapleton and Clive Lucas drew up plans for the restoration while Stan Hellyer, a specialist in restoring buildings, oversaw the building phase.

The house is one of about 20 stone colonial farm houses in the Hawkesbury Valley and is distinguished by the jerkin head roof and the fact that a coach (or cart) house with an impressive arched entrance was built into the main structure. The stone was quarried at 2 quarries, located on the site about 100 metres south of the building. Other features include 3 stone water tanks, each 9m by 2m.

In 2009, the property was sold to Selena Mazuran, owner of the FBI Fashion College in Glebe. She added 2300 square meters of adjoining land in 2012, with infrastructure such as three rotating solar panels, six rainwater tanks, a chapel, an outdoor chess set and a swimming pool.

== Description ==
The house is sited on 20 hectares (increased from 18 under Mazuran's ownership) on a low, reportedly "never-flooded" sandstone peninsula which is rounded by the flood plains of Currency Creek and Howe's Creek. The low timbered hills beyond these plains carry dry sclerophyll forest with occasional patches of wet sclerophyll vegetation on the southern sides. The levels are such that the plains flood regularly and there is no possibility of building on them. After flooding there is a large population of water birds. Normal bird life ranges from eagles (wedge tailed, sea and little) to small finches of various kinds.

The property is situated at the end of a country lane and is approximately 46.5 acres of good arable grazing land. There is a large dam and a shed/garage with parking for two cars. It has 1.5 acres of mature gardens that follow European and Australian traditions with a mixture of exotic and native trees and shrubs. Within the garden with its outstanding rural outlooks, are an in-ground fishpond, gazebo, topiary, box (Buxus sp.) maze and a 15m analemmatic sundial. Tall forest red gums (Eucalyptus tereticornis) provide an imposing backdrop and there is considerable evidence of past aboriginal presence on the site.

Stannix Park was built as a two-storey stone farm house with a usable attic and a single storey rear skillion. The steep ( 55') pitched roof is of jerkin head design. The double stone walls which are 64 cm thick and rubble filled are laid in 150 mm courses with dressed quoins at the corners and at the doors and windows. The skillion and the upper part of the rear wall collapsed about 30 years ago and the stone was removed. The upper wall was rebuilt in brick soon after. Photographs from c. 1900 show that the skillion had a kitchen area at the north end and an open wooden store or stable at the south. A 20th century verandah has been removed but during recent site clearing the base stones for four verandah posts were found together with the excavations in the rock platform in which they sat. The original verandah was 1.8 m wide and will be replaced later this year. The double doored archway to what was originally a cart or coach house has a keystone dated 1839 with the initials H.H. (presumed to be Henry Hall, the son of William Hall). The significance of a second inscription S11 is not known.

In 1983 all windows were missing and the external doors were in very bad condition. The gable walls had partly collapsed at either end because of termite damage to the wall plates and the chimney was leaning dangerously. A new galvanized steel roof had been fitted by a previous owner.

Today the walls have been repainted with lime mortar and the gables and chimney rebuilt. A new rear skillion has been erected on the original footings with a cavity brick wall and provision has been made to face this with 150 mm stone at a future date. The west wall of the suggested stable area has been faced with sawn weatherboards and the stone facing will link with this.

The 1950s brick wall at the rear has been cement rendered and ruled to match the stone courses of the building. The doors and windows have been replaced to match original details. The doors are mostly of ledged and sheeted design with hand shaped hinges and hand made thumb latches or rimlocks that reproduce those used originally. The windows are of inward-opening casement type where it was evident that these were originally used and in other positions six pane, double hung, box frames with wood sash lifts have been fitted. All joinery is of cedar, and cedar panelling reveals have been fitted wherever these were used originally. Plaster ceilings are installed at the ground floor level where originally provided but all other ceilings have exposed joists; about 70% of these are original. The flooring in the main house is 150 mm box and in the skillion 150 mm tallow wood. The only early stairs in the building were a steep racked flight in the original cart house. These have been retained, but a second flight has been installed at the ground-floor level. The old ladder access to the attic has been replaced by a concealed stairway, but the original attic trap door has been retained. Restoration work on the house has been carried out principally by Stonehill Restorations to plans and specifications prepared by Ian Stapleton of Clive Lucas Stapleton and Partners.

The entrance from the front verandah leads to the large lounge room with a huge fireplace. The adjacent dining room retains the original hand-sawn timbers and the sandstone walls and floor.

In the two upstairs levels there is a second lounge room and three large bedrooms offering views over the entire property. The house has two bathrooms, a large kitchen, a walk-in pantry and a sun room with a slow-combustion heater. Sustainable living is a feature with 240 V solar power, large domestic water tanks and gas stove and hot water.

== Heritage listing ==
Constructed in 1839, Stannix Park House is a rare and important colonial vernacular farm house of the Hawkesbury River area. The combination of farm house and carriage/cart house within a single building is most unusual and is believed to be unique in the area. It is reminiscent of its early English derivation. The house was built by an early colonist of some note and has been owned by the descendants of some of the earliest Australian families.

Stannix Park House was listed on the New South Wales State Heritage Register on 2 April 1999.
