= Social event =

Singular episode of social interaction

In social psychology, a social event is precisely defined as a social interaction episode characterized by a singular, continuous goal or purpose.

This conceptualization views a social event as an atomic unit of social interaction. For example, if a father and a child are coloring, and the father's initial goal is to give son some attention, but shifts to teaching the child the father could start teaching the child to color within the lines. This continuous episode would be considered is split in two distinct social events, due to the change in purpose, in accordance with the goal of the activity.

Conversely, in abroader usage the term "social event" can encompass any gathering of people for any reason event, activity, or gathering of a group of people for any purpose. The word "event" can refer to any action, and describes a wide variety of activities. Related terms, such as "special event", are also difficult to define.

Communication among participants is not necessarily a defining characteristic of a social event. For example, while chats between spectators are part of a football match event, it is not its defining characteristic.

A social event may happen within another social event, which can be described in sociological research by the term "recontextualization".

In entertainment, the field of planning and executing social events is called event planning or event management.

== Explanations ==
There are a wide variety of explanations of why social events exist. Psychologist Robert E. Lana has summarized several of these:

1. A social event is exclusively part of the biological and behavioral characteristics of the human organism and is, therefore, predictable and potentially explainable by experimental analysis that excludes the historical.

2. A social event is part of a process that, although constantly changing, returns to similar forms again and again. That is, social history occurs in cycles that allow for order and universality in explaining how human beings live together.
3. A social event is part of a patterned, orderly progression of social change that allows for prediction, but without cyclical change being part of the explanatory context.
4. A social event is unexpected and unrepeatable and can only be recorded and added to other unrelated, unrepeatable social moments such as wars, political events, etc.

5. Social events follow no discernible pattern at any level of analysis.

Social events also tend to fall into distinct patterns, For example, as Nathan Rousseau points out:

A marriage ceremony involves distinct actors engaging in joint actions in order to pull off a mutually recognizable social event. Every marriage ceremony may be distinct due to social custom and individual idiosyncrasies; nevertheless, the joint actions of the participants will form a social phenomenon recognizable as a particular event. It will be a social event that does not look like a funeral or a football game but rather one that conveys some notion of what the disparate parties understand as a wedding.

== See also ==
- Social activity (disambiguation)
