= USS Thomas Jefferson =

USS Thomas Jefferson may refer to the following ships of the United States Navy:

- USS Thomas Jefferson (APA-30) was an attack transport in service from 1941 to 1949, and scrapped in 1974
- USS Thomas Jefferson (SSBN-618) was an Ethan Allen-class ballistic missile submarine commissioned in 1963. She remained on active service until 1985.

== See also ==
- USS Jefferson
