= Active (1850) =

Coordinates: 32.92°S 151.79°E

History

New South Wales
- Name: Active
- Owner: Alexander Brown Jnr & James Brown
- Port of registry: Sydney
- Builder: Daniel Biallie [?] Paterson River, New South Wales, Australia
- Identification: registration number: 57/1850
- Fate: Wrecked 18 February 1852 at Newcastle, New South Wales Hunter River
- Completed: 1850

General characteristics
- Type: Composite ketch
- Tonnage: 40 GRT, 40 NRT
- Length: 14.90 m
- Beam: 4.907 m
- Draught: 2.011 m

Active was a ketch that was launched in 1850 and that wrecked at the entrance of the Hunter River in New South Wales on 18 February 1852.
