= USRC Jefferson (1845) =

19th c. American steamship

History

United States
- Name: Jefferson
- Builder: Freeman, Knapp & Totten
- Completed: April 1845
- Fate: Abandoned in Patagonia in 1851 due to storm damage

General characteristics
- Type: Survey ship
- Tons burthen: 343 tons
- Length: 160 ft 0 in (48.77 m)
- Beam: 24 ft 0 in (7.32 m)
- Draft: 9 ft 9 in (2.97 m)
- Propulsion: One high-pressure steam engine, 36" cylinder with a throw of 32" producing 120 horsepower
- Sail plan: Three-masted schooner
- Speed: 6.9 knots under steam 9.2 knots under sail and steam
- Crew: 4 officers and 40 men
- Armament: 26 gun ports, but only 1 gun mounted

USRC Jefferson was a three-masted, coal-fired steamship built for the US Revenue Cutter Service in 1845 and named for Founding Father and third U.S. president Thomas Jefferson. Her design and construction were advanced and experimental for her time. Her hull was made of riveted iron plates, rather than wood planks. She was fitted with experimental propellers rather than paddlewheels, but was still expected to sail. Like many early attempts at new technology, the ship was an operational failure. She was slow and subject to mechanical breakdowns. Originally expected to patrol Lake Ontario for smugglers from Canada, it became clear that she was not going to be able to catch them.

The Jefferson was reassigned to the US Coast Survey, where speed was less important, in 1848. In 1849 she made at least one survey on the Atlantic coast, albeit with ongoing mechanical issues. After this survey season, she was converted to sidewheel propulsion and ordered to San Francisco where she was to lead survey efforts on the West Coast of the United States. In June 1851, on her voyage to take up her new assignment, she was damaged in a storm off the east coast of Patagonia. Jefferson made it to port without loss of life, but the ship was a total loss. She was condemned as unseaworthy and abandoned in Argentina. Her place on the west coast was taken by USCS Active.

== Early history ==
Jefferson was part of an early experiment to learn how steam propulsion should best be incorporated into ship design. Screw propellers were new at the time, and it was unclear what design provided the best efficiency and how their mechanical reliability might vary. It was also unclear how various paddlewheel and propeller designs might impact the sailing qualities of ships. This was important because coaling stations were few and far between, and coal storage aboard ships was limited. Long voyages required sailing to save coal. The Revenue Cutter Service built eight steamers in the mid-1840s to test the performance of different ship designs. Jefferson was one of these experiments.

Jefferson was built by the firm of Freeman, Knapp, and Totten, as part of a three-ship contract that also included USRC John Tyler, and USRC George M. Bibb. The iron hull plates and frames were produced at the firm's Fort Pitt shipyard across the Allegheny River from Pittsburgh. Since the ship was assigned to serve in Lake Ontario, her hull was disassembled and shipped by canal boat to Oswego, New York. There, final assembly was supervised by John W. Capes, who also assisted John Ericsson in the construction of USS Monitor and other ironclads. Jefferson was launched in April 1845. She was subject to speed trials in September 1845. In a calm sea she achieved a speed of 7.9 mph (12.7 km/h), albeit while suffering two mechanical breakdowns, over the course of two hours sailing. She burned 668 pounds (303 kg) of coal per hour. Two days later, with all sails set and the steam engine running full throttle, she achieved a speed of 10.6 mph (17.1 km/h) while burning 600 pounds (270 kg) of coal per hour.

Jefferson's original propeller was designed by John Ericsson. This propeller broke twice and was replaced by a propeller design by Richard Loper that was 9 ft 6 in (2.90 m) in diameter. The new propeller was produced in Philadelphia and shipped to Buffalo for installation on Jefferson in August 1845. She spent much of her time in Lake Ontario under repair or laid up.

The ship was named for President Thomas Jefferson. She was the third USRC vessel named Jefferson.

== Coast Survey ==
Jenkins' chart of Hatteras Shoals based on Jefferson's 1849 survey

Jefferson sailed from Oswego to New York in August 1848. She sailed in consort with USRC Dallas, another troublesome vessel found unsuitable for the Revenue Cutter service. Both ships were assigned to the Coast Survey and modified for hydrographic use. Jefferson had a small triumph on September 22, 1848, when she demonstrated to the pilots and ship owners of New York Harbor that Buttermilk Channel was navigable. David Dixon Porter, then a lieutenant, had surveyed the channel only a few days before. With Secretary of the Treasury Robert J. Walker aboard, Porter ran the ship through the channel and up the East River demonstrating the usefulness of the waterway.

Thornton A. Jenkins was assigned as commanding officer of Jefferson in 1849. He found his new command had been stripped of much of her equipment but managed to get the ship out to sea. She left Norfolk on July 20, 1849, to survey Hatteras Shoals. A strong gale came up, and after the storm blew through, Jefferson found the brig Benjamin Carver dismasted and drifting toward shore. Jenkins was able to take the derelict under tow and bring her safely to Norfolk, which he reached on July 22, 1849. She sailed from New York on August 30, 1849, to survey portions of the Virginia, Delaware, and North Carolina shores. Jefferson arrived back in Norfolk on September 30. The trip was plagued by mechanical breakdowns, including a rotten bowsprit that broke off. The Coast Survey decided to idle the ship on November 17, 1849, and she was moored in Baltimore.

The taking of Alta California during the Mexican-American War and the California gold rush suddenly made the west coast of North America a priority for the U.S. government. To exploit the commercial opportunities of the new territory, shippers needed aids to navigation, starting with charts. Congress appropriated money to repair Jefferson so she could begin to survey the west coast. In 1850 she sailed from Baltimore to Philadelphia. She was hauled out on the Southwark marine railway where a new boiler was installed and she was converted to sidewheel propulsion.

== Loss of Jefferson ==
The newly refit Jefferson sailed from Philadelphia on March 9, 1851, to take up her new role in the Pacific. Lieutenant Francis Key Murray commanded the ship. She reached Rio de Janeiro on April 25, 1851, and sailed for Montevideo April 28. She left that port with fair winds on June 19, 1851. A storm came up on June 24, and by the morning of the 25th high winds had created large following seas. At 3 P.M. a cross sea caused the ship to broach, and she heeled over on her side. Murray ordered all sheets let go to allow the ship to right herself, but this action proved inadequate because of the force of the wind on the loose sails, rigging, and spars. As water came over the bulwarks threatening to sink the ship, Murray ordered the foremast and mainmast cut down and thrown overboard. At this, the ship righted herself, but tangled rigging held the fallen mainmast to the ship's side, where its stump battered the hull repeatedly. The wreckage was cut away before the hull was pierced, but now the sodden ship was laboring as waves crashed over it. The gun ports on deck were removed to allow water to flow off the ship. Her gun, extra spars, and provisions went over the side to lighten the ship.

Sailing under her mizzen alone, it took Jefferson three days to reach Port Desire, Argentina on the east coast of Patagonia. The ship was wrecked. A survey of Jefferson after the storm reported that her hull leaked 23" to 24" of water a day, presumably because some rivets holding the iron hull plates together had broken. All her spars were gone except the mizzen mast. Her rudder was damaged and the ship steered wildly. Her decks sagged and damage to her topsides was extensive. The engines were no longer securely fastened to the ship but rocked back and forth by three inches as they ran. Given the ship's poor performance and the practical difficulties and cost associated with repairing her in Patagonia, Jefferson was abandoned.

Jefferson had not been successful as a revenue cutter on Lake Ontario because she was too slow. She failed as a survey ship because she was too unreliable. Her propulsion technology experiments had failed. Reporting the abandonment, a newspaper in Buffalo which knew her from her Lake Ontario service, opined, "...she is gone without costing any lives." "We are glad to be rid of Jefferson on such terms."
