= Active (1801 whaler) =

History

France
- Captured: 1800

United Kingdom
- Name: Active
- Owner: Daniel Bennett, Blackheath
- Acquired: 1801 by purchase of a prize
- Fate: Lost January 1803
- Notes: This vessel is frequently conflated with Active (1804 ship) because both were French prizes and whalers, with the same master and the same owner, with the second replacing the first within a year of the loss of the first.

General characteristics
- Tons burthen: 400, or 419, or 420, or 430 (bm)
- Length: 116 ft 0 in (35.4 m)
- Beam: 30 ft 6 in (9.3 m)
- Propulsion: Sail
- Complement: 35
- Armament: 16 × 6&4-pounder guns
- Notes: Two decks and three masts

Active was a French ship that came into British hands in 1800 as a prize. William Bennet purchased her and named her Active. He employed her as a whaler and she was lost in January 1803 at the start of her second whaling voyage.

== Career ==
Active was first listed in Lloyd's Register in 1801, and in the Register of Shipping for 1802. Both show her master as Jn. Dunn, her owner as Bennett, and her trade as London to the South Seas Fishery.

Captain John Dunn acquired a letter of marque on 16 May 1801. On 22 May Captain John A. Dunn sailed from England on a whaling voyage. He returned on 7 September 1802, having sailed from Saint Helena on 11 July, bound for England. She was valued at £9,000 in 1802.

Captain Lewis (or Louis) Blair sailed Active from England on 27 October 1802.

== Fate ==
Active, Blair, master, was lost in January 1803 at the Island of Desolation. The Register of Shipping for 1804 still carried her with Blair as master.

In April 1804 Captain Blair acquired a letter of marque for the 1804 Active.
