= USRC Active =

USRC Active was the name of six vessels of the United States Revenue Cutter Service, and may refer to:

- USRC Active (1791), a topsail schooner launched in 1791 and sold in 1798
- USRC Active (1812), a cutter chartered in 1812 that served until 1817
- USRC Active (1816), a cutter in service from 1816 until grounded in 1823 and decommissioned in 1825
- USRC Active (1843), a revenue boat built in 1843 and apparently in service until 1847
- USRC Active (1867), a schooner in commission from 1867 to 1875

For United States Coast Guard ships named Active, see USCGC Active
