= Thomas Hansen (captain) =

Master of the first mission ship to New Zealand

Thomas Hansen Snr.
- Born: 1762; Cornhill, London, England
- Died: January 30, 1837; NSW, Australia
- Occupation: Sea Captain
- Known for: Captain of the Brig Active, first Mission ship to New Zealand, 1814.
- Spouse: Hannah Coates (1751–1823).
- Children: 2

Captain Thomas Hansen Snr. (1762-1837) was the master of the first mission ship to New Zealand, the brig Active. Hansen was born in 1762, and baptised in the parish of St Peter upon Cornhill, London, on 8 May 1763 at age 16 months.

Hansen was married to Hannah Coates, in 1783.

The second voyage of the Active in 1814, brought the Reverend Samuel Marsden to New Zealand, where Marsden preached the first sermon, on Christmas Day 1814

During another voyage of the Active, arriving at the Bay of Islands, New Zealand in February 1816, Captain Hansen rescued the last six surviving men of the Betsy, who had made shore and had been looked after by a Māori tribe at North Cape.
