= Active (1800 ship) =

History

France
- Launched: 1793
- Captured: c.1799

Great Britain
- Name: Active
- Owner: Peter Everitt Mestaer & Co.
- Acquired: c.1799 by purchase of a prize
- Fate: Last listed 1815

General characteristics
- Tons burthen: 496, or 500 (bm)
- Propulsion: Sail
- Complement: 40
- Armament: 1800:22 × 6&9-pounder guns; 1801:18 × 6-pounder + 2 × 9-pounder guns; 1809:12 × 6-pounder guns

Active was a French ship launched in 1793. She came into British hands circa 1799 as a prize. Peter Everitt Mestaer purchased her and named her Active. She made one voyage to India for the British East India Company (EIC), which held a monopoly at the time on trade between Great Britain and India or China. From 1802 she was a London-based merchantman, trading first with Hamburg and then more generally. She was last listed in 1815.

== Career ==
Active was first listed in the Register of Shipping and in Lloyd's Register in 1801. Both showed her owner as P. Mestaer, and her trade as London-Bengal. Her master was J.L. Smith or J. Smith.

Captain John Greitin Smyth acquired a letter of marque on 6 December 1800. She had been tendered to the EIC to bring back rice from Bengal. She was one of 28 vessels that sailed on that mission between December 1800 and February 1801.

It is not clear when she sailed for India, but she arrived back at Portsmouth on 10 November 1801, having left Madras on 5 July and Saint Helena on 19 September.

On her return, Active started to trade between London and Hambro (Hamburg). This continued through Lloyd's Register for 1807. Active was no longer listed in Lloyd's Register in 1808, but she reappeared in the Register of Shipping for 1809 (the Register is not available on line for 1807 or 1808). In 1809 Active's master was J. Welch, her owner was P. Mestaer, and her trade was London transport.

== Fate ==
Active was last listed in the Register of Shipping for 1815. Her master was J. Welsh, her owner was P. Mestaer, and her trade was London transport.
