= USRC Active (1816) =

Ship of the U.S. Revenue Cutter Service

History

United States
- Name: USRC Active
- Namesake: In action; moving; causing action or change
- Cost: $1,300 USD
- Acquired: August 1816
- Decommissioned: 1825

General characteristics
- Type: Revenue cutter
- Tonnage: 38 tons
- Length: 125 ft (38 m)

Active was a revenue cutter in commission in the United States Revenue Cutter Service from 1816 to 1825. She was the third Revenue Cutter service ship to bear the name.

The Revenue Cutter Service purchased Active at Baltimore, Maryland, in August 1816. Although she worked in New York City for a short time in 1817, Active served on the Chesapeake Bay for most of her career. During her first year of service, another USRC Active, chartered in 1812, was in commission, meaning that in 1816-1817 the Revenue Cutter Service had two ships named Active in commission at the same time.

In the early nineteenth century, new laws in the United States prohibited the slave trade between the United States and foreign countries and required the enforcement of Neutrality Acts from 1815 to 1823 during troubles with European nations, creating new missions for the Revenue Cutter Service. Active was part of the service's efforts to suppress the slave trade and piracy.

Active was blown aground in 1823. By then long in need of repairs and replacement, she was decommissioned sometime in 1825.
