= USS Jefferson County =

1944 LST-542-class tank landing ship

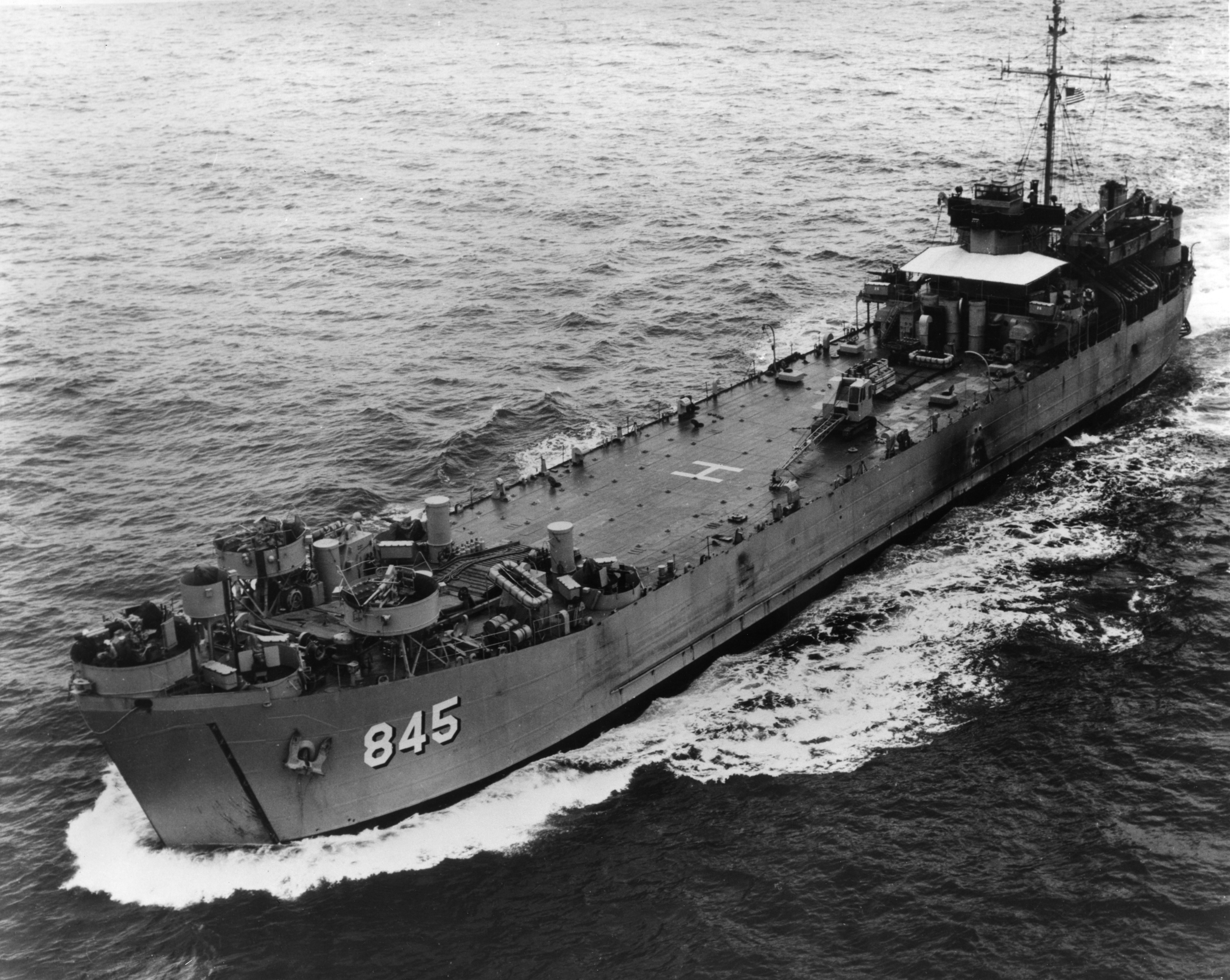
- Jefferson County under way

History

United States
- Name: USS LST-845
- Builder: American Bridge Company, Ambridge, Pennsylvania
- Laid down: 23 October 1944
- Launched: 7 December 1944
- Commissioned: 1 January 1945
- Decommissioned: 28 November 1960
- Renamed: USS Jefferson County (LST-845), 1 July 1955
- Stricken: 1 February 1961
- Honours and awards: 5 battle stars (Korea)
- Fate: Sold for scrapping, 22 August 1961

General characteristics
- Class & type: LST-542-class tank landing ship
- Displacement: 1,625 long tons (1,651 t) light; 3,640 long tons (3,698 t) full
- Length: 328 ft (100 m)
- Beam: 50 ft (15 m)
- Draft: Unloaded : 2 ft 4 in (0.71 m) forward; 7 ft 6 in (2.29 m) aft; Loaded : 8 ft 2 in (2.49 m) forward; 14 ft 1 in (4.29 m) aft
- Propulsion: 2 × General Motors 12-567 diesel engines, two shafts, twin rudders
- Speed: 12 knots (22 km/h; 14 mph)
- Boats & landing craft carried: 2 × LCVPs
- Troops: Approximately 130 officers and enlisted men
- Complement: 8-10 officers, 89-100 enlisted men
- Armament: 8 × 40 mm guns; 12 × 20 mm guns

USS Jefferson County (LST-845) was an LST-542-class tank landing ship built for the United States Navy during World War II. Named after counties in 25 states, she was the only U.S. Naval vessel to bear the name.

USS LST-845 was laid down by the American Bridge Company, Ambridge, Pennsylvania, on 23 October 1944; launched on 7 December 1944; sponsored by Mrs. B. F. Fairless; and commissioned at New Orleans, Louisiana, on 1 January 1945.

== World War II ==
After shakedown off the Florida coast, LST-845 departed New Orleans for the West Coast on 7 February. Steaming via the Panama Canal, she loaded cargo at San Diego and San Francisco, then sailed on 15 March for the Hawaiian Islands. She touched at Maui on 24 March to unload cargo; reached Pearl Harbor the 26th; and returned to Maui on 4 April for amphibious training operations. While beached on 6 April, she broached in heavy surf and sustained heavy damage to her hull. Towed out to sea on 9 April, she underwent repairs at Pearl Harbor from 10 April to 27 July before resuming amphibious training.

Carrying troops and cargo, LST-845 departed Pearl Harbor in convoy for Japan on 29 August. She arrived Sasebo on 22 September and supported occupation landings before sailing for the Philippines three days later. Steaming via Subic Bay, she reached Lingayen Gulf on 7 October to embark more occupation troops for transportation to Japan. Between 12 and 19 October she sailed to Sasebo; and, during the next month, she supported occupation operations along the western coast of Kyushu Island. Departing Sasebo late in November, she steamed via the Marianas to Pearl Harbor where she arrived 20 January 1946.

== Inter-war years ==
LST-845 operated out of Pearl Harbor until 29 April when she sailed for the Far East. Sailing via Okinawa, she arrived off Shanghai, China, on 30 May. During the next two months, she operated from Nanjing to Hankou in the Yangtze River, carrying men and military cargo and supporting Chiang Kai-shek's Chinese Nationalist troops during the civil war between them and the Chinese Communist Party. She departed Shanghai on 24 July; and, after steaming on cargo runs to the Philippines and Okinawa, she returned to Qingdao, China, on 3 September, loaded with military cargo. Then, from 9 to 28 September, she sailed to Pearl Harbor. Departing 4 December for the West Coast, she touched at San Francisco the 15th and reached San Diego on 20 December.

During the next two years she took part in amphibious training operations out of San Diego. Between 10 January and 4 March 1949 she transported cargo to Juneau and Kodiak, Alaska. Departing San Diego on 16 May, LST-845 made a cargo run to the mid-Pacific, carrying military supplies to bases in the Marshall Islands and the Mariana Islands. After returning to San Diego on 17 July, she operated off Southern California during the next 12 months.

== Korean War ==
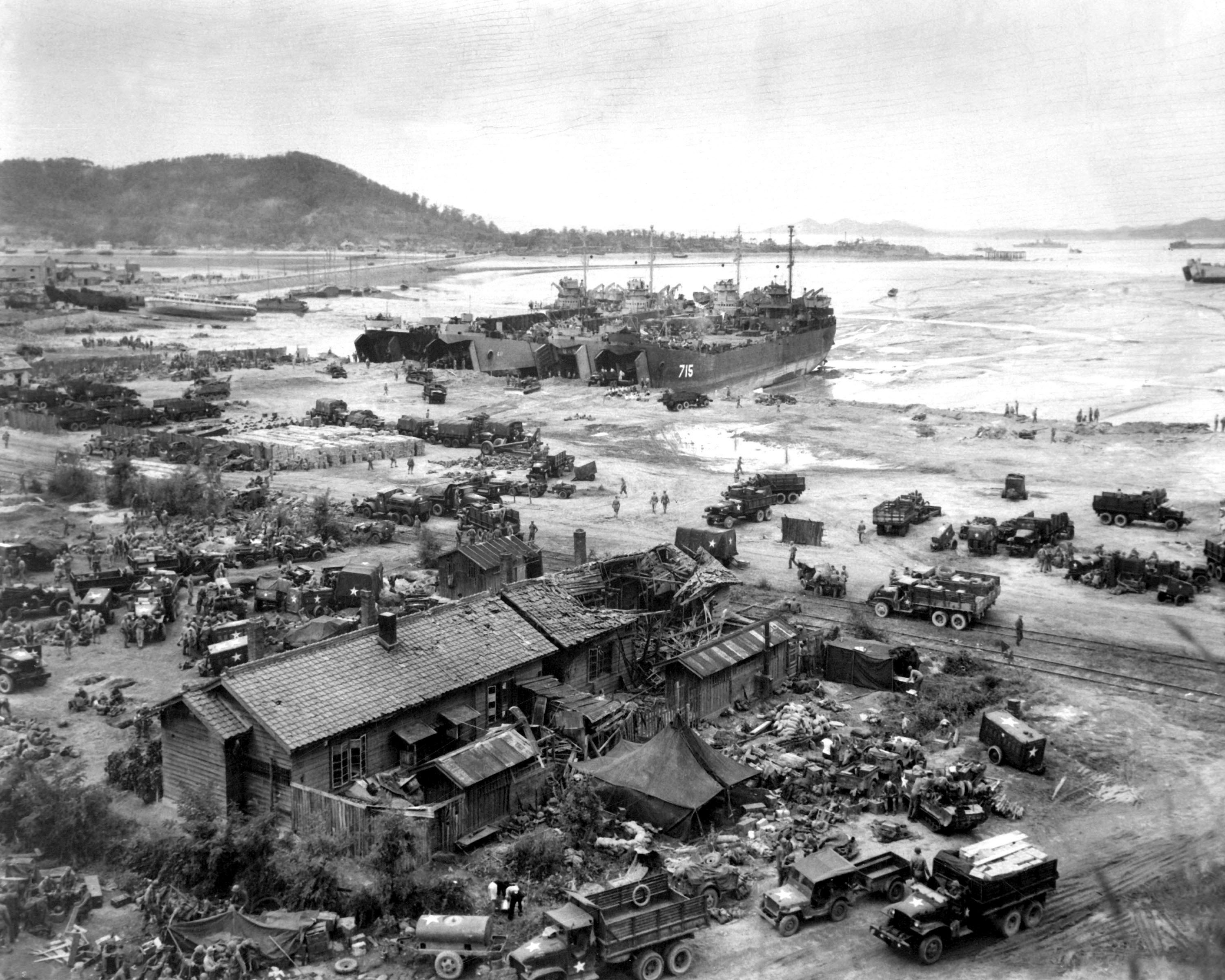
Inchon Invasion, September 1950. Four LSTs unload men and equipment while "high and dry" at low tide on Inchon's "Red Beach," 16 September 1950, the day after the initial landings there. LST-715 is on the right end of this group, which also includes LST-611, LST-845, and one other. Another LST is beached on the tidal mud flats at the extreme right. Note bombardment damage to the building in center foreground, many trucks at work, Wolmi-Do Island in the left background and the causeway connecting the island to Inchon. The ship in the far distance, just beyond the right end of Wolmi-Do, is Lyman K. Swenson (DD-729).

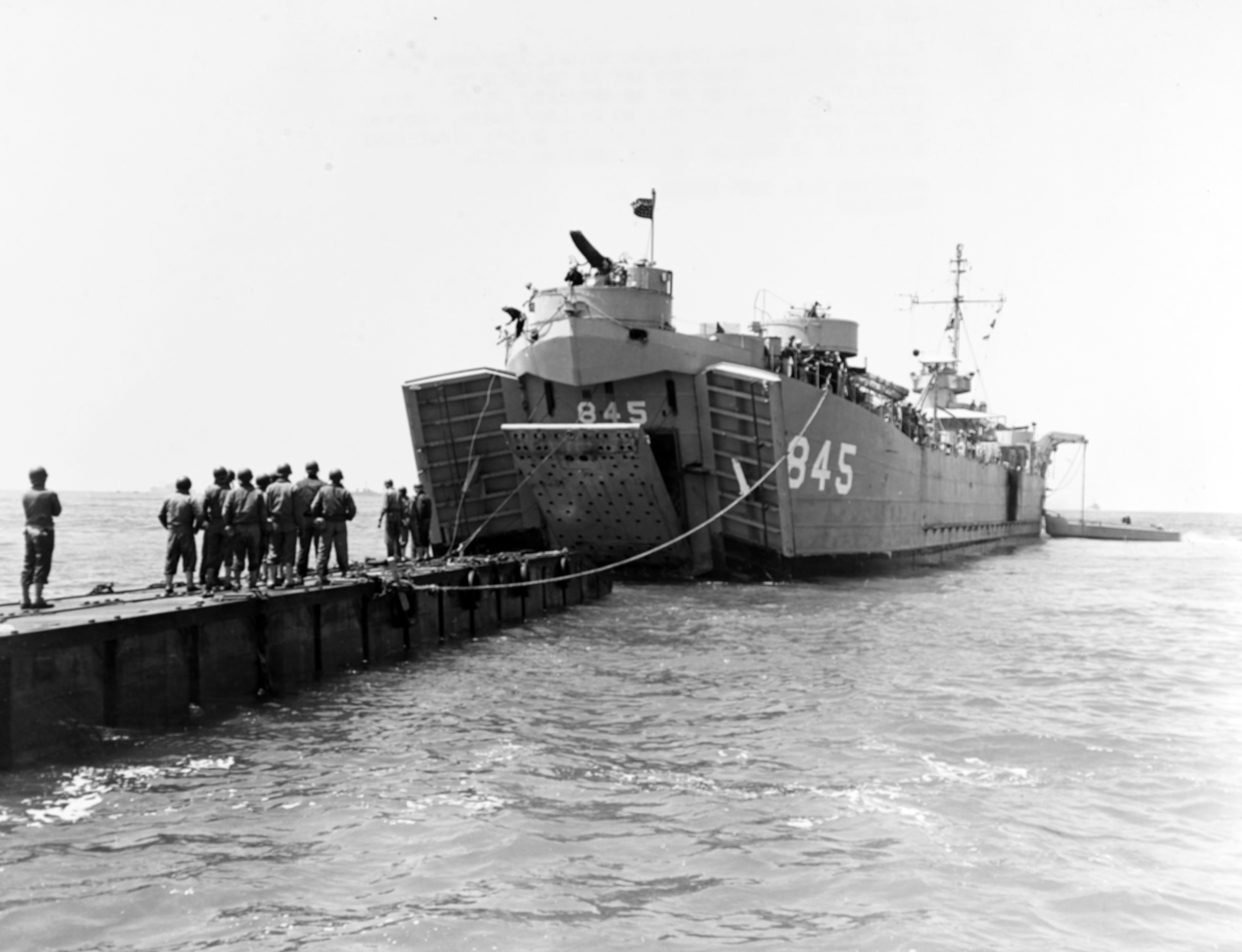
LST-845 "married" to a pontoon causeway during landing operations in Korean/Japanese waters, 26 March 1951

In response to the invasion of South Korea by North Korean troops on 25 June 1950, LST-845 departed San Diego on 10 August and sailed to the Far East to bolster the American effort to repel this Communist aggression. Arriving Kobe, Japan, on 6 September, she embarked combat troops and departed on 10 September for amphibious landings at Inchon, Korea, which were designed to thwart the Communist advance through South Korea and spearhead an Allied offensive northward. Standing off Inchon, she boated troops for the assault; and, following the successful landings, she remained off Inchon during the next mouth to unload military cargo. She departed Inchon on 15 October and steamed to the eastern coast of Korea to carry cargo from Pusan to Wonsan and Hŭngnam. Following the entrance of Communist China into the Korean War, LST-845 supported the evacuation of Hŭngnam and made three runs south to Pusan. On 24 December she helped evacuate the remaining military forces before sailing via Pusan to Japan where she arrived Yokosuka on 31 December. During the next few months LST-845 continued to carry cargo between Japan and ports in South Korea. She departed Yokosuka on 25 April 1951, sailed via Pearl Harbor, and reached San Diego on 23 May.

LST-845 took part in amphibious training operations for the better part of a year; and, after overhaul, she departed San Diego on 26 May 1952 to again support U.N. forces in Korea. Arriving Sasebo, Japan, on 10 July, she spent more than six months in Japanese and Korean waters bolstering the naval supply line to South Korea. She departed the Far East on 4 February 1953, arrived San Diego on 5 March, and operated off Southern California during the remainder of 1953.

== Post-war ==
Departing San Diego on 25 January 1954, LST-845 steamed on her third deployment with the 7th Fleet in the Far East. She reached Yokosuka on 25 February; and during the next five months cargo runs and amphibious exercises sent her from Japan to Iwo Jima, Okinawa, and Inchon. On 14 August she departed Yokosuka for Haiphong, North Vietnam, to provide support for "Operation Passage to Freedom." She reached Haiphong on 27 August and made four runs to Tourane, South Vietnam, during the several weeks. In addition to transporting military cargo, she carried civilian refugees seeking to escape from Communist domination in North Vietnam. After returning to Yokosuka on 20 October, LST-845 sailed for the United States on 7 November and arrived San Diego on 12 December.

While operating out of San Diego, LST-845 was renamed USS Jefferson County (LST-845) on 1 July 1955. She trained along the California coast until 13 August 1957 when she again departed for the western Pacific. She arrived Yokosuka on 13 September and resumed cargo runs and amphibious exercises which carried her along the Japanese coast to Okinawa, Hong Kong, and the Philippines. Departing Dingalan Bay, Luzon on 1 March, she arrived San Diego on 1 April. Jefferson County sailed for the Marshall Islands on 9 October; and, after arriving at Kwajalein on 2 November, she operated during the next three months supporting the establishment of Air Force stations in the Marshalls. She returned to San Diego on 4 March 1959.

Following amphibious training out of San Diego, she departed for the Far East on 1 October 1959. She reached Yokosuka on 3 November and resumed training and readiness exercises along the coast of Japan. Sailing for the United States on 12 April 1960, she arrived San Diego on 5 May.

== Decommissioning and sale ==
Jefferson County was decommissioned at San Diego on 28 November 1960 and entered the Pacific Reserve Fleet. Her name was struck from the Naval Vessel Register on 1 February 1961. She was sold for scrapping to Zidell Explorations, Inc. of Portland, Oregon, on 22 August 1961.

== Awards ==
LST-845 received five battle stars for Korean War service.
