= Activity (UML) =

Concept in Unified Modelling Language

An activity diagram, with the activity "Cooking Spaghetti" outlined with an "Activity frame"

An activity in Unified Modeling Language (UML) is a major task that must take place in order to fulfill an operation contract. The Student Guide to Object-Oriented Development defines an activity as a "sequence of activities that make up a process." Activities can be represented in activity diagrams. The word Activity is often confused with that of Action, which describes a step within an activity.

An activity can represent:

- The invocation of an operation.
- A step in a business process.
- An entire business process.

Activities can be decomposed into subactivities, until at the bottom we find atomic actions.

The entire activity can be enclosed in a rounded rectangle called an "Activity Frame", with the name of the activity listed in the upper left corner, although it is often omitted.

The underlying conception of an activity has changed between UML 1.5 and UML 2.0. In UML 2.0 an activity is no longer based on the state-chart rather it is based on a Petri net like coordination mechanism. There the activity represents user-defined behavior coordinating actions. Actions in turn are pre-defined (UML offers a series of actions for this).

== Literature ==
- Conrad Bock: UML 2 Activity and Action Models, in Journal of Object Technology, vol. 2, no. 4, July-August 2003, pp. 43-53
- Conrad Bock: UML 2 Activity and Action Models Part 2: Actions, in Journal of Object Technology, vol. 2, no. 5, pp. 41-56
- Conrad Bock: UML 2 Activity and Action Models Part 3: Control Nodes, in Journal of Object Technology, vol. 2, no. 6, pp. 7-23
- Conrad Bock: UML 2 Activity and Action Models Part 4: Object Nodes, in Journal of Object Technology, vol. 3, no. 1, pp. 27-41
