= Active (1877) =

Australian merchant ship wrecked in 1898

History

New South Wales
- Name: Active
- Owner: John Breckenridge, Cape Hawke
- Port of registry: Sydney
- Ship registration number: 11/1877
- Ship official number: 74902
- Builder: William Woodward Brisbane Water, New South Wales, Australia
- Completed: 1877
- Fate: Wrecked

General characteristics
- Type: Ketch
- Tonnage: 49 GRT
- Displacement: 49 NRT
- Length: 20.6 m
- Beam: 5.4 m
- Draught: 1.9 m
- Installed power: NA
- Ship primary use: Transport
- Ship industry: cargo - coastal
- Ship passenger capacity: 0
- Crew: 4

Active was a wooden ketch that was wrecked on 19 January 1898 on the Oyster Bank at the entrance of Newcastle Harbour, New South Wales, Australia, near the previously wrecked schooner Colonist while carrying a cargo of ironbark to Morpeth, New South Wales, under the command of Captain P. Williams. There were no casualties but the ship was lost. The wreck has not been located, but the approximate co-ordinates of the shipwreck are 32.92°S 151.79°E.
