= Social activity =

Social activity may refer to:

- Agency (sociology), the individual (or 'micro') component of the structure and agency debate
- Agency (philosophy), the similar but distinct concept in philosophical action theory
- Social relation, the fundamental topic of analysis for social scientists
- Interpersonal relationship
- Social action, a Weberian concept in sociology relating to social 'actors' and their causes and effects
- Social event, in social psychology, a social interaction with a single, continuous goal or purpose
- Human migration, the movement of human beings from one area to another

== See also ==
- Society
- Culture
- Civilization
- Social structure
- Theory of structuration
- Action theory (sociology)
- Base Superstructure paradigm
- Social event
