= Proxy card =

Easily acquired or home-made substitute for a collectible card

A proxy card is an easily acquired or home-made substitute for a collectible card. A proxy is used when a collectible card game player does not own a card, and it would be impractical for such purposes to acquire the card. This usually occurs when a player desires a card that is cost-prohibitive, or is "playtesting" with many possible cards. When doing intensive training for a competitive tournament, it often makes more sense to use proxy cards while figuring out which cards to bring to the tournament. Another card is substituted and serves the same function during gameplay as the actual card would.

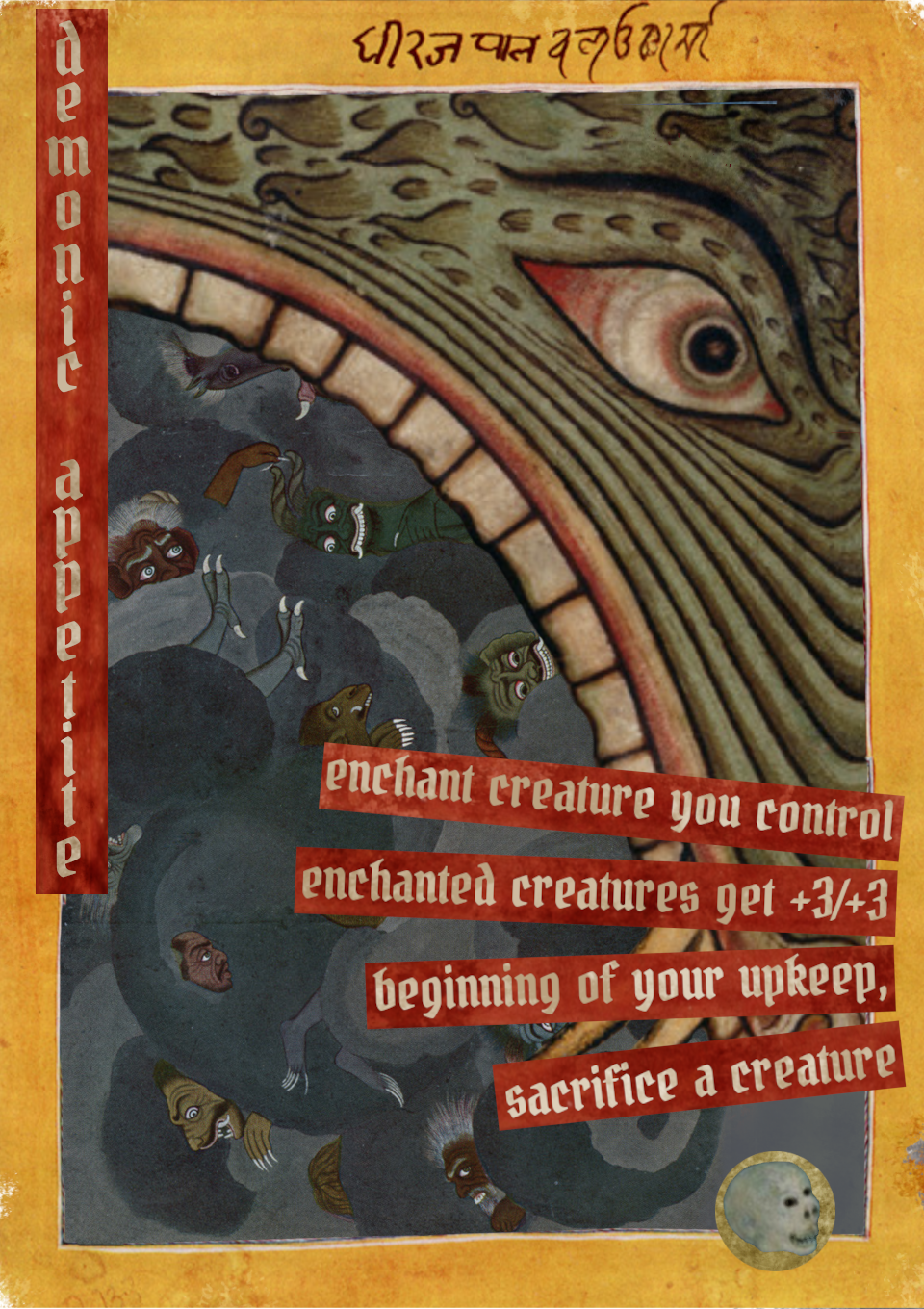
A Magic the Gathering proxy card of Demonic Appetite created in a collage style.

A proxy can also be used in cases where a player owns a very valuable card, but does not wish to damage it by using it in actual play.

== Common usage ==
Proxy cards can be used in various situations. The rules and restrictions are object of common agreement, or a given policy, and may differ from the above-mentioned "fair play requirements".

- In casual games, the players may agree on a common policy of how to deal with proxy cards. This allows to play a higher variation of card combinations and strategies, while keeping a limit on the expenses.
- In tournaments, the organizer may permit a limited number of proxy cards, and define rules about how these cards must look. This policy has become especially popular in games or formats where some vital cards are far too expensive, such as the vintage format in Magic: The Gathering.
- For playtesting. Proxy cards allow a player to test new cards, before they decide to actually buy or trade for them.
- In card prototyping. Card developers in companies like Wizards of the Coast use proxies to playtest their ideas for new cards before they are printed.
- Some players create cards based on their own ideas for card themes and mechanics. In this case, however, the term "proxy" may no longer be applicable, as these cannot be considered substitutes for existing objects.
- An extreme form of copying original cards is forgery of expensive cards, which is again outside the "proxy" category.

Famous cards that are often proxied are the so-called power nine in Magic: The Gathering, which are considered totally out of balance in gameplay, while being unaffordable for the average player, due to their rarity and enormous price on the secondary market.

== Rules when playing with proxy cards ==
Players who do not trust each other blindly will usually agree on common rules, defining which kind and number of proxies, if any, is allowed for each player. These rules may vary drastically depending on the participants and the occasion. However, some restrictions are implied naturally by common sense and plain physics.

=== Indistinguishable on the back ===
The main issue to guarantee fair play in a card game is that all cards in the deck must be indistinguishable for any player who does not view the front side (if card sleeves are used, the term 'card' means the sleeve with the card inside). Ideally, all cards should be indistinguishable in the following characteristics to effectively prevent cheating.

- Card size and shape, including the typical rounding cut on the edges.
- The card's total weight, its center of gravity and, ideally, the moment of inertia (which implies a homogeneous distribution of mass on the surface).
- Overall and local stiffness and elasticity - all cards should behave equally on bending.
- Overall and local thickness.
- Feel and relief (tactile characteristics) of the card, especially elevations and cavities on the surface on both sides.
- The image printed on the back side, including its shininess.
- Overall and local transparency, when examined with a light from behind.

Besides these physical implications, it should be considered that someone (the players or a judge) will need to control the validity of the cards - which may prove difficult with some of the above points.

Therefore, the use of proxies is sometimes further constrained to only one method of fabrication, for instance.

The difficulties of control can also be an argument to totally prohibit the use of proxy cards.

=== Unambiguous mappings on the front ===
Once the front of a proxy is revealed to the other players, it must be clear to everyone what it is meant to substitute. The decisions of what a player's proxies are meant to substitute must be made before starting play. If two proxies are meant to substitute different cards, they must be easily distinguishable by looking at their front side. Ideally, the label of a proxy should be enough to tell what it's meant to substitute. Alternatively, a legend or agreement can be used to prohibit players from changing these mappings during play.

Another issue for the front side labeling is to maintain a fluid game play. Poor labeling will likely cause unpleasant disruptions, even slips and mistakes caused by accidental confusion. It is therefore desirable that each proxy is labeled with the name of the card it substitutes, and its basic game-relevant characteristics, and erase all decorations and printed information that may be misleading. Any relevant information that is not written on the card should at least be found in the legend.

=== Agreements and coded rules ===
Additional rules can restrict the number of proxy cards allowed in a deck, and the physical ways in which they may be created. Such rules can be a simple agreement between two players, or they may be defined by the host of a tournament.

Magic: The Gathering tournaments sanctioned by the DCI allow the use of proxy cards only to replace cards damaged during play (e.g. water is spilled on a deck mid-tournament, causing some cards to be marked). Some third party organisations hosting Magic tournaments permit participants to include a set number of proxy cards in their decks (5 and 10 being common amounts), a clause that especially comes up for the cost-intensive vintage format.

== Common ways of fabrication ==
Some players create their own proxy cards by editing original cards. Ideally, they take a cheap original card that shares as many characteristics as possible with the card that should be proxied. Editing includes:

- partially erasing the original print using a rubber or chemicals (acetone). However, this will most likely carve and damage the material, and thus affect the stiffness, balance and transparency characteristics.
- writing, painting or printing on the surface, preferably using a thin fine-liner.
- Adhesive labels (stickers) attached to the front of the original card. However, this will most likely create a relief that can be read like braille. It will also affect the stiffness and balance characteristics (distribution of mass).

Cards can also be created from scratch, using an imaging software or specialized program (like Magic Set Editor for Magic: The Gathering), printer and scissors. Special attention needs to be paid on the choice of paper (for weight and stiffness) and the accuracy of the cut. Usually, a card back can not be printed in a way that would be indistinguishable from the original, however.

In some cases, proxy cards can be acquired from third-party manufacturers. For copyrighted card games, however, these will usually not be allowed to reprint original artwork - so the back side will not look like the original cards.

Difficulties with the back side are often dealt with by using card sleeves with an opaque back. This also allows to put more than one piece of paper in one sleeve.

Another possibility is to completely play with proxies, and thus get around most of the problems described above. In this case, the cards no longer need to look and feel like originals, only the proxies need to be equal to each other in the above characteristics.

Some players prefer to avoid any such pain of handcrafting, and instead use a legend - a table that maps some of the physical cards in that player's deck to other cards that they would like to have instead. This method doesn't need any physical manipulation on the original cards, and it does not conflict with any of the above described physical restrictions. However, in actual play it can be rather confusing always having to look into the legend.
