= USRC Active (1812) =

Ship of the U.S. Revenue Cutter Service

History

United States
- Name: USRC Active
- Namesake: In action; moving; causing action or change
- Acquired: 1812
- Decommissioned: 1817

General characteristics
- Type: Revenue cutter

USRC Active, was a revenue cutter of the United States Revenue Cutter Service in commission from 1812 to 1817. She was the second Revenue Cutter Service ship to bear the name.

Acquired in 1812, Active was possibly a chartered vessel. She saw service during the War of 1812. Commanded by Revenue Captain Caleb Brewster, she was part of a flotilla that was blockaded at New London, Connecticut, by the Royal Navy during the War of 1812. Active remained in service until 1817.

Another cutter named USRC Active entered service at Baltimore, Maryland, in 1816, so that for at least one year there were two cutters in service in the Revenue Cutter Service with the same name.
