= Active (1793 ship) =

History

Great Britain
- Name: Active
- Launched: 1789, New Brunswick
- Captured: 1795
- Fate: Burnt after capture

General characteristics
- Tons burthen: 169 (bm)

Active was a snow launched in New Brunswick in 1789, possibly under another name. She first appeared in Lloyd's Register in the volume for 1793. She traded as a West Indiaman, sailing between Bristol and Jamaica.

Year	Master	Owner	Trade	Source
1793	Goddard	Cunningham	Bristol–Jamaica	LR

In April 1795 Lloyd's List reported that the French corvette Jean Bart had captured Active as Active was sailing from Bristol to Jamaica. The French took Active's crew on board Jean Bart and then burnt Active. Shortly thereafter the Royal Navy captured Jean Bart.
