= Active (1804 ship) =

Ship that disappeared in the Tasman Sea in 1810

History

France
- Name: Alsace
- Launched: 1803
- Captured: 1803

United Kingdom
- Name: Active
- Owner: 1804:Daniel Bennett, Rotherhithe; 1808:William Robins, Thomas Pritzler, & John & William Phillips
- Acquired: 1804 by purchase of a prize
- Fate: Disappeared on or after 16 February 1810
- Notes: This vessel is frequently conflated with Active (1801 whaler) because both were French prizes and whalers, with the same master and the same owner, with the second replacing the first within a year of the loss of the first.

General characteristics
- Tons burthen: 104, or 121, or 122, (bm)
- Length: 72 ft 3 in (22.0 m)
- Beam: 20 ft 3 in (6.2 m)
- Sail plan: Brigantine
- Complement: 18
- Armament: 1804:10 × 4&9-pounder guns; 1805:10 × 4-pounder guns; 1806:4 × 3-pounder guns + 4 × 9-pounder carronades; 1807:4 × 3-pounder guns + 1 × 18-pounder carronade; 1808:14 × 6-pounder guns
- Notes: One deck and two masts

Active was the French ship Alsace that the Royal Navy captured in 1803. William Bennett purchased her and named her Active, in place of a previous Active that had been lost in January 1803. She then made one whaling voyage for him. Bennett sold her to Robins & Co., and she sailed between London and Buenos Aires. She then sailed on a second sealing voyage. She was lost in 1810.

== Career ==
HMS Aigle captured the French ship Alsace in 1803.

Active is first listed in Lloyd's Register in 1804, and in the Register of Shipping in 1805. Both show her master as L. Blair, her owner as Bennett, and her trade as London to the South Seas Fishery.

Captain Lewis Blair acquired a letter of marque on 28 April 1804. He sailed from England on 10 May 1804, bound for the Island of Desolation. Active was reported to be at Portsmouth on 22 June, still outward bound. She was reported to have been at the Island in March 1805. She returned to England on 17 September 1805. (Note: Of the 812 vessels in the British Southern Whale Fishery, 345 (42%), made only one voyage.)

Bennett sold Active to Robins & Co. Lloyd's Register for 1806 shows Active's master changing from Blair to T. Paylor, and her owner from Bennett to Robins & Co.

Lloyd's Register for 1807 shows Active, with T. Paylor, master, Robins & Co., owner, and trade London—Buenos Aires. The next year her captain changed from T. Paylor to Oates. Owner and trade remained unchanged.

Captain John Baden (or Baker, or Bader), sailed from England on 27 September 1808. The Register of Shipping for 1809 shows Active's master as J. Bader and her trade as London to the Fishery.

== Loss ==
Active was under the command of Captain John Bader when she was driven ashore in Westernport Bay, Australia on 11 June 1809. No crew were lost, but the 1300 skins she had gathered were lost. She was refloated and sailed to Sydney, arriving on 24 July. There she underwent repairs, including receiving new masts.

On 11 December 1809 Active, again under the command of Bader and with a sealing party aboard, headed for the Open Bay Islands on the west coast of New Zealand. Bader landed a sealing party on a small island on 16 February 1810. Active then set sail for Sydney; she was never seen again.

The sealing party remained stranded until in 1813 Governor Bligh rescued them. The survivors returned to Sydney on 15 December 1813.

== Post script ==
During 1847, a Nelson newspaper reported that a sealing party had discovered the hull of a brig surrounded by bushes near Bluff Point in Southland. Items found nearby suggested that it was likely to be the wreck of Active, possibly run ashore with sails set during a period of limited visibility.

The song, Davy Low'ston, tells the story of the sealing party's ordeal.

== Registers ==
Lloyd's Register and the Register of Shipping carry inconsistent information that indicates the possibility there was a third Active operating at the time that the registers conflated with the other two.

Lloyd's Register	Register of Shipping
Burthen: 130 tons	Burthen: 104 tons (†), or 121 tons (‡)

Year	Master	Owner	Trade	Master	Owner	Trade
1804	Blair	D. Bennett	London—South Seas			Not listed
1805	Blair	Bennett	London—Southern Fishery	L. Blair	Bennet	London—Southern Fishery†
1806	Blair; T. Paylor	Bennet; Robins & Co.	London—South Seas Fishery	L. Blair	Bennet	South Seas Fishery†
1807	T. Paylor	Robins & Co.	London—Buenos Aires			Not available
1808	T. Paylor; Oates	Robins & Co.	London—Buenos Aires			Not available
1809	Oates	R. Fayle	London privateer)	J. Bader	Phillips & Co.	London Fishery‡
1810	Oates	R. Fayle	London privateer	J. Bader	Phillips & Co.	London—South Seas Fishery‡
1811	Oates	B. Fayle	London privateer)	Oates	W. Robins	London privateer†
1812	Oates	B. Fayle	London privateer	Oates	W. Robins	London privateer†
1813			Not listed	Oates	W. Robins	London privateer†
1814			Not listed	Oates	W. Robins	London privateer†
1815			Not listed	Oates	W. Robins	London privateer†

== See also ==
- List of people who disappeared mysteriously at sea
