= Surrogate =

A surrogate is a substitute or deputy for another person in a specific role and may refer to:

== Relationships ==
- Surrogacy, an arrangement where a woman agrees to carry and give birth to a child for another person who will become its parent at birth
- Surrogate partner therapist, in sexual therapy
- Surrogate marriage, a custom in Zulu culture

== Economics ==
- Ersatz, an artificial replacement differing in kind from and inferior in quality to what it replaces.
- Surrogation, a psychological phenomenon in management science

== Arts ==
- Author surrogate or audience surrogate, reciprocal literary techniques
- The Surrogates, a comic book series
- Surrogates (film), a 2009 film based on the comic book series
- The Surrogate (1984 film), a Canadian erotic film starring Art Hindle
- The Surrogate (1995 film), a TV movie starring Alyssa Milano
- The Surrogate (2020 film), an American LGBT-related Independent drama film
- The Surrogate, original title of The Sessions, a 2012 film starring John Hawkes, Helen Hunt, and William H. Macy
- "Surro-Gate", an episode of the cartoon series American Dad!
- "The Surrogate" (The Outer Limits), an episode of the 1990s version of The Outer Limits series
- Surrogate Paintings, a series by American artist Allan McCollum

== Science and technology ==
- Surrogate model, used in engineering design
- Surrogate endpoint, a measure of effect in clinical trials
- Surrogate key, a unique database identification key
- Surrogate proxy, a type of server network setup
- Surrogate mechanism, which allows UTF-16 to represent Unicode code points beyond the Basic Multilingual Plane as a pair of surrogate code points
- Surrogate data testing, a technique for identifying possible nonlinearity in data.
- Surrogate, used in library science. Metadata is created to represent information resources. The metadata serves as the surrogate for stored information resources.
- Surrogate species, used in ecology and conservation biology to indicate the following:
  - Flagship species, chosen to support the marketing of a conservation effort
  - Indicator species, which reveals the qualitative status of the environment
  - Keystone species, which has a large effect on its environment
  - Sentinel species, used to detect risks to humans by providing advance warning of a danger
  - Umbrella species, whose protection indirectly protects many other species sharing its habitat

== Other uses ==
- Surrogate (clergy), a deputy of a bishop or ecclesiastical judge
- Surrogate Court, a court primarily concerned with the distribution of assets of a decedent
- Surrogate alcohol, a substance containing alcohol that is consumed, though it is not meant for human consumption
