= USCGC Active =

USCGC Active has been the name of more than one vessel of the United States Coast Guard, and may refer to:

- USCGC Active (WPC-125), later WSC-125, a patrol boat in commission from 1926 to 1947 and from 1951 to 1962
- USCGC Active (WMEC-618), a medium endurance cutter in commission since 1966
- Active (WMSM-921), a planned Heritage-class cutter

== See also ==
- For ships named Active that served in the United States Revenue Cutter Service, predecessor to the United States Coast Guard, see USRC Active.
