= USCS Active =

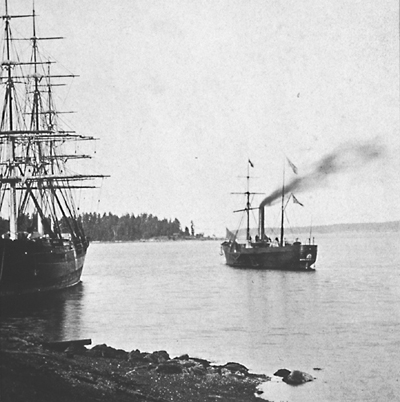
- The only known photograph of Active

History

United States
- Name: Active
- Builder: J. A. Westervelt (New York, NY)
- Launched: 5 September 1849
- Christened: Gold Hunter
- Completed: November 1849
- Acquired: (by U.S. Coast Survey): 1852
- Commissioned: 1852
- Decommissioned: 1861
- Fate: Wrecked south of Cape Mendocino June 5, 1870

General characteristics
- Type: Survey ship
- Tons burthen: 600
- Length: 172 ft 5 in (52.55 m)
- Beam: 24 ft 5 in (7.44 m)
- Draft: 10 ft 3 in (3.12 m)
- Propulsion: 2 × side-lever engines; sidewheels
- Speed: 12 knots
- Crew: 68 (in 1860)

Active was a survey ship that served in the United States Coast Survey, a predecessor of the United States Coast and Geodetic Survey, from 1852 to 1861. Active served on the U.S. West Coast. She conducted the Coast Survey's first reconnaissance from San Francisco, California, to San Diego, California, in 1852. Active sometimes stepped outside her normal Coast Survey duties to support U.S. military operations, serving as a troop transport and dispatch boat during various wars with Native Americans and during the San Juan Islands "Pig War" with the United Kingdom in 1859. She also rushed Union troops to Los Angeles, California, in 1861 during the early stages of the American Civil War.

She was sold by the government in 1862 and sailed along the West Coast for a number of private companies until June 5, 1870. In a dense fog she hit a rock near the shore in Humboldt County, California and had to beach to prevent sinking in deep water. Her passengers and crew were saved, but the ship was lost.

== Early history (1849–1852) ==
The ship was built at the Westervelt & MacKay shipyard in New York and launched in September 1849. She was a coal-fired sidewheel steamer, but also rigged as a two-masted sailing ship to take advantage of favorable winds. Like several other shipping entrepreneurs, Westervelt & MacKay sought to take advantage of the commercial opportunities afforded by the California gold rush by building a ship for service in the Bay Area. She was christened Gold Hunter. The ship sailed for San Francisco via Cape Horn in December 1849. After multiple stops, she arrived in San Francisco on April 29, 1850, with 150 passengers aboard. She immediately began freight and passenger service between San Francisco and Sacramento for the firm of Simmons, Hutchinson & Co.

Evidently, her owners were not satisfied with running Gold Hunter on the Sacramento River. On May 22, 1850, the company announced it would shift the ship to the San Francisco - Portland route at the end of the month. The next day, it announced that the ship would instead run from San Francisco to Mazatlan, Mexico beginning June 10, 1850. Neither plan happened.

Gold Hunter was headed down the Sacramento River at about 9 P.M. on June 11, 1850, when her pilot saw a light ahead. He thought the light was on an anchored ship, but in fact it was the steamer McKim headed up the river for Sacramento. McKim turned to starboard to avoid a collision, crossing Gold Hunter's bow. Gold Hunter hit her amidships, holing McKim below her waterline. Flooding was immediate and McKim's captain headed for shore to beach the ship. Rising waters extinguished the boiler fires before she reached the shore and McKim settled to the bottom in about twelve feet of water. There were no injuries. Gold Hunter was not seriously damaged in the collision. She took McKim's 75 passengers and their baggage to San Francisco and then back to Sacramento. Since McKim was also operated by Simmons, Hutchinson & Co., Gold Hunter took her place in the company's schedule and remained on the Sacramento River.

McKim was refloated, and Gold Hunter began running between San Francisco and Acapulco in September, 1850. She made one round-trip per month stopping in Monterey, Santa Barbara, San Pedro, San Diego, San Blas, Mazatlan, and Acapulco. This venture does not appear to have been successful, as Simmons, Hutchinson & Co. sold the ship to Portland interests in January 1851. She ran between San Francisco and Portland completing two round-trips per month. This new routing was also short-lived. In March 1851, the ship changed hands again to run between San Francisco and Tehuantepec, Mexico. She sailed for the Tehuantepec Railroad Company which sought to establish a transcontinental link via steamers in the Atlantic and Pacific Oceans connected by a railroad across the isthmus of Tehuantepec. This American business was controversial in Mexico in the wake of the Mexican-American War. Gold Hunter sailed from San Francisco on March 22, 1851, and arrived at Ventosa Bay on April 6, 1851. She landed her 65 passengers and they began their overland travel to the Atlantic coast by mule. They were ordered back to Ventosa Bay by Mexican authorities and Gold Hunter was not allowed to land cargo for the railroad, ostensibly because Tehuantepec was not a port of entry.

At some point in 1851, likely shortly after it became clear that she was not going to be allowed to support the Tehuantepec Railroad, the ship was acquired by Cornelius Vanderbilt's Independent Line. His vision was to create a transcontinental link not across Mexico, but across Nicaragua. Gold Hunter sailed between San Francisco and San Juan del Sur, the western terminus of Vanderbilt's route between the Atlantic and Pacific. This venture, too, was controversial within the host country and ultimately failed.

== USCS service (1852–1862) ==
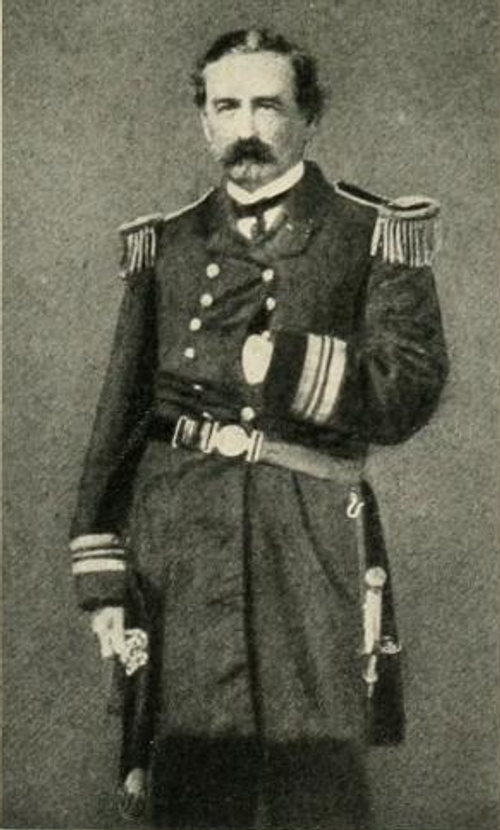
James Alden, jr., commander of Active from 1852 to 1860

As commerce on the west coast grew in the wake of the California gold rush, the United States needed basic aids to navigation, starting with charts. The Coast Survey dispatched the steamer USRC Jefferson from Philadelphia in March 1861 to meet this need. Unfortunately, the ship was wrecked in a storm off the east coast of Patagonia in May, 1851. Rather than send another ship from the east coast to replace Jefferson, the Coast Survey purchased Gold Hunter in February 1852 and renamed her Active. Lieutenant James Alden, Jr., was her first commanding officer in Coast Survey service. He remained her captain for most of the ship's time with the government. Active's primary mission was to produce nautical charts of the West Coast of America. Her initial tasks in 1852 were to survey Cape Flattery and the south shore of the Strait of Juan De Fuca, and to resurvey the mouth of the Columbia River. In 1854 Active surveyed the new port of Seattle, which had been settled by the Denny party only three years before. In 1855 she surveyed San Francisco Bay. In 1856 she surveyed San Diego Bay, San Clemente Island, and the Monterey Peninsula. In 1857 the ship carried the U.S. survey corps which established the boundary between Washington Territory and the British possessions which later became Canada. In 1858 she surveyed Grays Harbor and Shoalwater Bay in Washington Territory. A new chart of San Pedro Harbor was produced in 1859 and Active surveyed Humboldt Bay.

As one of the few government ships stationed on the west coast, Active was frequently called upon to provide aid to mariners in distress. In 1853, for example, she was dispatched to the wrecks of Lewis, and Carrier Pigeon, and on false alarms to rescue John Stuart, and to a supposed wreck on the Farallon Islands. In 1854 she was sent to find the overdue Sea Bird and ended up towing the disabled ship to port. In November 1858, she rescued 147 people from the Farallon Islands where their ship, Lucas, had gone aground in a thick fog.

The ship was also used to support U.S. military operations against Native American tribes in conflicts in the Pacific Northwest. In December 1855 she sailed to Oregon to support Major General John E. Wool in what became known as the Rogue River Wars. She carried arms and ammunition from San Francisco to the U.S. forces in Oregon. In February 1856 Active carried two companies of infantry to Seattle to support settlers in the conflict that became known as the Puget Sound War. For most of the first quarter of 1856 Active patrolled Puget Sound, moving men and material for the Army and keeping watch on Native American movements. She returned to San Francisco in April, 1856 with General Wool and his staff aboard.

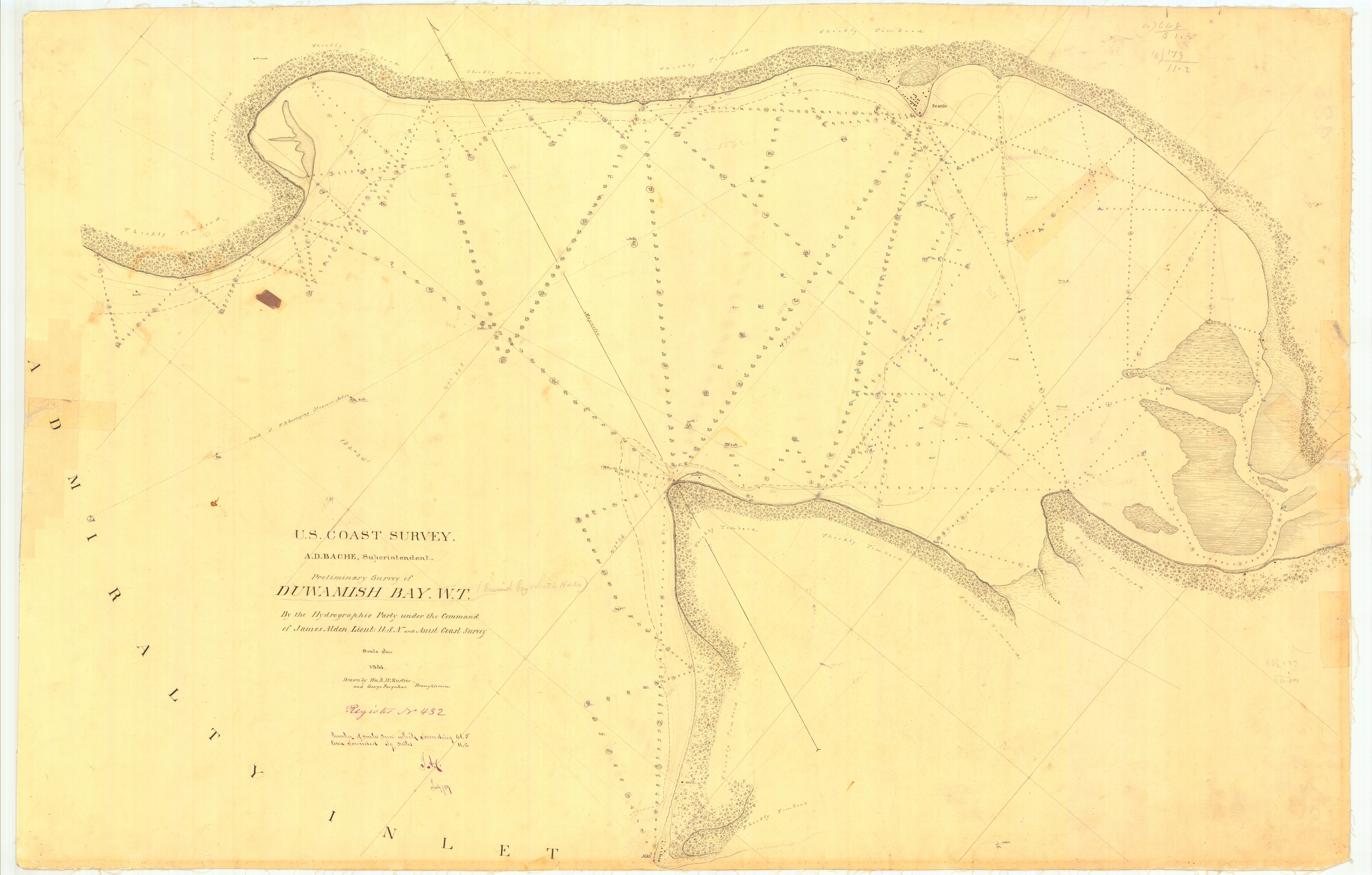
Active's 1854 survey of what is now Elliott Bay, Seattle's port

The Northwest Boundary Survey, which Active supported in 1857, was successful in establishing the land border between the United States and the British Columbia. The survey did not, however, finalize the status of the San Juan Islands. Both the British and American militaries maintained bases on San Juan Island, which both nations claimed. Tensions grew into a skirmish later known as the "Pig War". In 1859 Active was pressed into military service again during the tensions, delivering men and supplies to the American Camp on San Juan Island.

At the outbreak of the American Civil War, California's sympathies were largely with the Union, but Confederate interests were also present. Active was one of very few government vessels on the west coast, and in view of the emergency was transferred to U.S. Navy control in July 1861. One of her first jobs for the Navy was to reinforce Union control of Southern California by transporting Companies D and K of the U.S. Army's 4th Infantry to San Pedro in August 1861. On September 19, 1861 Active sailed from San Francisco for San Pedro with another company of infantry aboard.

== Commercial service (1862–1870) ==
Active was purchased from the government for $30,000 by the San Francisco-based shipping and trading firm McRuer & Merrill in June 1862. While McRuer & Merrill had originally intended to use the ship to trade with China, the Pacific Mail Steamship Company's Golden Gate caught fire and sank on July 27, 1862, with $1.4 million of gold and silver coin aboard. A salvage party chartered Active and sailed her to the wreck site off Manzanillo, Mexico on August 10, 1862. The salvage attempt was unsuccessful and she arrived back to San Francisco on October 29, 1862.

In December 1862, newspapers published reports that Active and two other steamers had been acquired by Mexico for coastal patrol. France's intervention in Mexico lent credibility to the rumors, but McRuer & Merrill quickly denied them.

The Fraser Canyon gold rush created immediate demand for shipping between San Francisco and British Columbia. The forty-niners who had rushed to California now rushed to the new gold fields to the north. Active was purchased by the California Steam Navigation Company to meet this demand. Beginning in October 1865, she was sailing between San Francisco, Portland, and Victoria. This route was contested between the California Steam Navigation Company and the California, Oregon, and Mexico Steamship Company. Ben Holladay, a tough steamboat pioneer, ran this dominant company. The two companies appeared to have an understanding that prevented a rate war. This changed in 1865 when Jarvis Patton established the Anchor Line, and put his ship Montana on the San Francisco - Victoria line. He cut prices to gain customers, but with only one ship on the route, the pricing equilibrium between the two main competitors more or less remained. In 1866, however, Patton built Idaho, and a full-scale rate war broke out. Profitability went out of the northern route. This caused the California Steam Navigation Company to sell its entire ocean-going fleet, including Active, to the California, Oregon, and Mexico Steamship Company in 1867. The Anchor Line was folded in shortly thereafter.

In March 1869 the California, Oregon, and Mexico Steamship Company was reincorporated under the laws of California as the North Pacific Transportation Company. Active continued to sail under the new company's name. Her trade was brisk: she arrived in San Francisco on July 2, 1869, with 336 passengers aboard. In an echo of her time as a survey ship, she carried a scientific party of the United States Coast Survey to the Chilkat River in the Summer of 1869 to observe a total eclipse of the sun. On this trip Active also carried William H. Seward to Sitka, for his first and only visit to Alaska, which he had been instrumental in acquiring for the United States.

== Loss ==
On June 4, 1870. Active left San Francisco on her normal route to Victoria. By the morning of June 5, she found herself in dense fog somewhere off Humboldt County. She was east of her intended course and found herself among the rocks just offshore. She turned to port to head out to sea and struck a submerged rock. Initial examination of the hold did not show any damage, so the ship continued to head away from land. Flooding from a leak forward was discovered shortly thereafter and the ship began to settle by the bow. The ship's pumps were not able to keep up with the flooding, so Captain Lyons beached Active. The passengers, their baggage, the mail, and supplies for the stranded people were safely brought ashore about 22 miles south of Cape Mendocino.

The captain dispatched the purser to Eureka, 80 miles away, to seek help. On foot and horseback, he reached the town at 3 P.M. on June, 6. Word of the wreck came just in time to reach the North Pacific Transportation Company's Pacific, which sailed immediately to the survivors. They were embarked on Pacific and brought to Crescent City. Pacific then returned to the scene of the wreck to attempt to salvage some of the $100,000 worth of cargo aboard Active. She had little success; waves were breaking over the stranded ship as high as her smokestack.
