= Draycott Sleights =

Geographical area in England

- Site of Special Scientific Interest
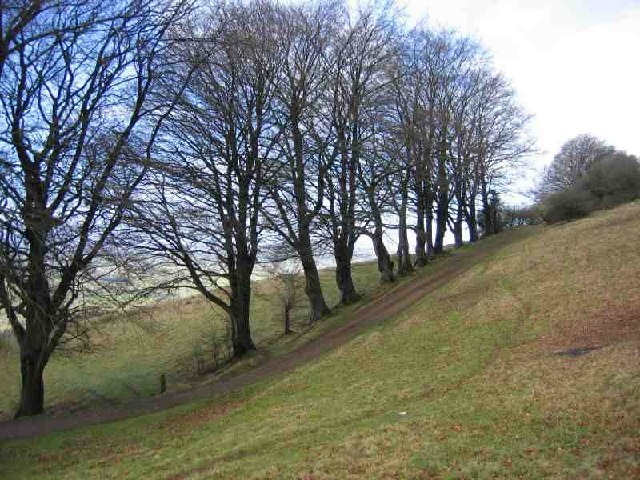

- Location within Somerset
- Location of Draycott Sleights.
- Area of search: Somerset
- Grid reference: ST483518
- Coordinates: 51.263°N 2.742°W
- Interest: Biological
- Area: 61.95 hectares (0.62 km^{2}; 0.24 sq mi)
- Notification date: 1987

Draycott Sleights (grid reference ST483518) is a 61.95 hectares (153.1 acres) biological Site of Special Scientific Interest at Draycott in the Mendip Hills, Somerset, England, notified in 1987. The name is pronounced locally as "Slates", presumably a variation on the Saxon word Slade meaning amongst other things hillside, rather than in the same manner as the Yorkshire place of the same spelling.

The Somerset Wildlife Trust reserve lies 3.5 km (2.2 mi) south east of Cheddar. It includes Draycott Sleights, 40.4 hectares (100 acres), and Draycott Housegrounds, 10.21 hectares (25.2 acres). Draycott Sleights is part of the Draycott Sleights Site of Special Scientific Interest (SSSI), Draycott Housegrounds is a County Wildlife Site. The entire reserve is within the Mendips Scarp Prime Biodiversity Area (PBA) and Mendip Hills Area of Outstanding Natural Beauty (AONB).

Draycott Sleights supports extensive areas of traditionally managed species-rich unimproved calcareous grassland. Additional interest lies in a rich invertebrate fauna. The site is situated on steep south-west facing slopes of the Mendip Hills and ranges in altitude from 90 m (300 ft) to 270 m (890 ft). 165 species of flowering plant have been recorded. The varied topography together with the widespread scrub provide a number of locations with ideal conditions for invertebrates supporting a rich butterfly fauna typical of unimproved calcareous grassland. 32 species of resident breeding butterfly have been recorded. The occurrence of Adonis blue (Lysandra bellargus), silver-studded blue (Plebejus argus) and small blue (Cupido minimus) is of particular interest. Two nationally scarce species of fly, Symphoromyia immaculata and Bombylius canescens and one nationally scarce species of ant, Myrmica schencki have been recorded for this site.
