= Charles Goodall =

Charles Goodall may refer to:

- Charles Goodall (physician) (1642–1712), English physician
- Charles Goodall (cricketer) (1782–1872), English cricketer
- Charles Goodall (poet) (1671–1689), English poet
- Charles Goodall (businessman) (1824–1899) Californian entrepreneur and politician, father of Charles Miner Goodall
- Charles Miner Goodall (1859-1922), Californian entrepreneur
