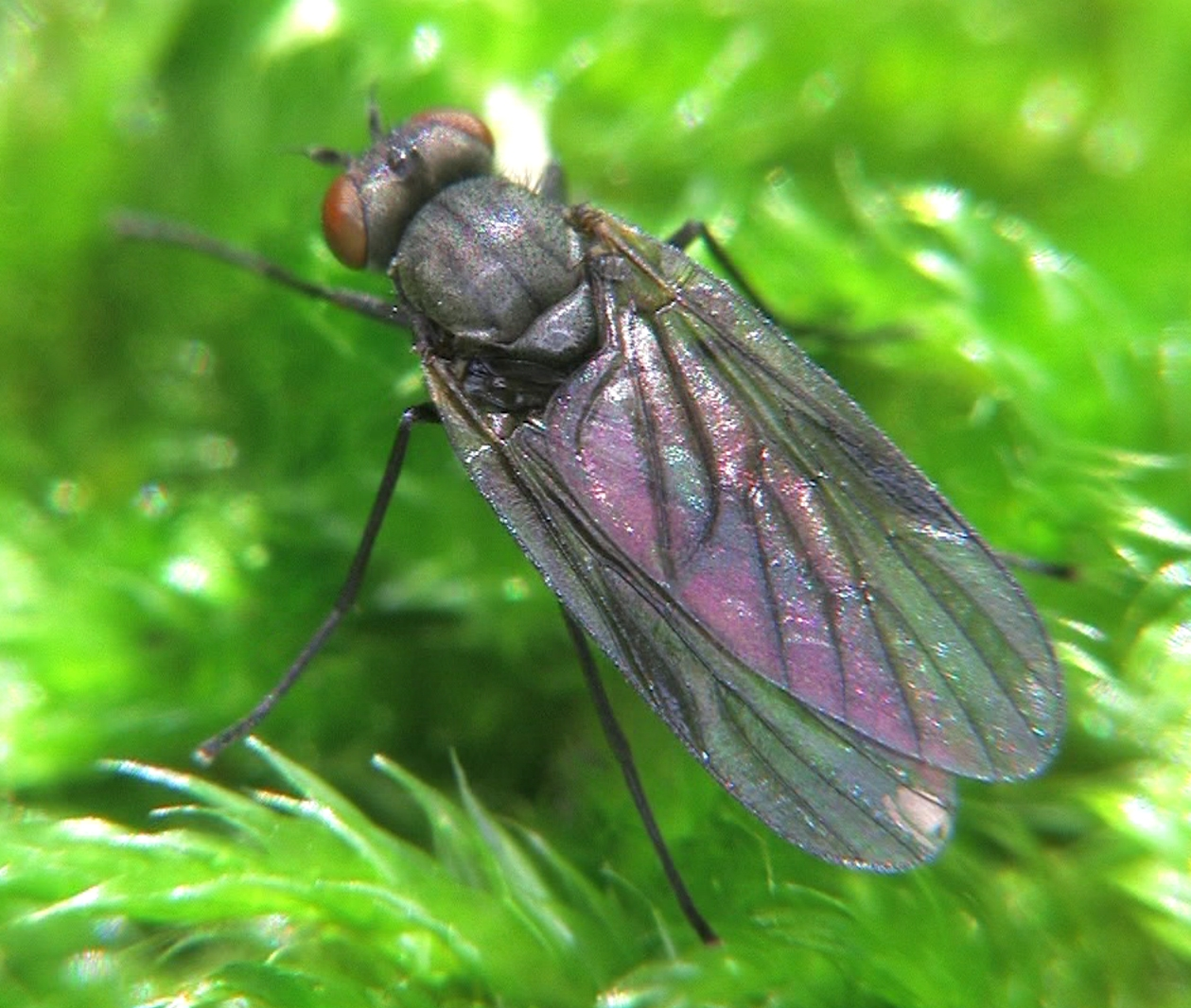
- Ptiolina cf. obscura

Scientific classification
- Kingdom: Animalia
- Phylum: Arthropoda
- Clade: Pancrustacea
- Class: Insecta
- Order: Diptera
- Family: Rhagionidae
- Subfamily: Spaniinae
- Genus: Ptiolina
- Species: P. obscura

Binomial name
- Ptiolina obscura (Fallén 1814)

Synonyms
- Ptiolina atra Staeger, 1842; Ptiolina nigra Zetterstedt, 1842; Leptis obscura Fallén, 1814; Leptis tristis Schilling, 1838; Ptiolina nigrina Wahlberg, 1854; Ptiolina nigripes Zetterstedt, 1859; Ptiolina wodzickii Frauenfeld, 1867; Tyolina tristis Walker, 1848

= Ptiolina obscura =

Species of fly

Ptiolina sp.

Ptiolina obscura is a species of snipe flies belonging to the family Rhagionidae.

It is a Palearctic species found over most of Europe.

== Description ==
Flies of this genus are tiny and black, quite unlike the normal conception of Rhagionidae. They may easily be mistaken for small Empididae and are little known probably because the species sometimes occur in considerable numbers for a very short period. Ptiolina can be confused only with Spania or Symphoromyia. Symphoromyia is distinguished by the kidney-shaped third antennal segment, or by having hairs on the metapleuron. In Ptiolina the metapleura (immediately in front of the halteres) are bare. Separating Ptiolina from Spania is more difficult. The terminal style of the antenna is centrally placed in Ptiolina; Spania lacks a true style, but the ventral margin of the last antennal segment is produced into a pseudostyle. In Ptiolina obscura The first segment of the is antenna bare, except for usual circlet of short hairs.The third antenna segment is short-oval, rounded at tip. Discal cell 5·0 times as broad as long.

The males are darker or more chocolate coloured than the females.

== Biology ==
Ptiolina is a stem borer of mosses.
