= Charles Goodall (businessman) =

American businessman

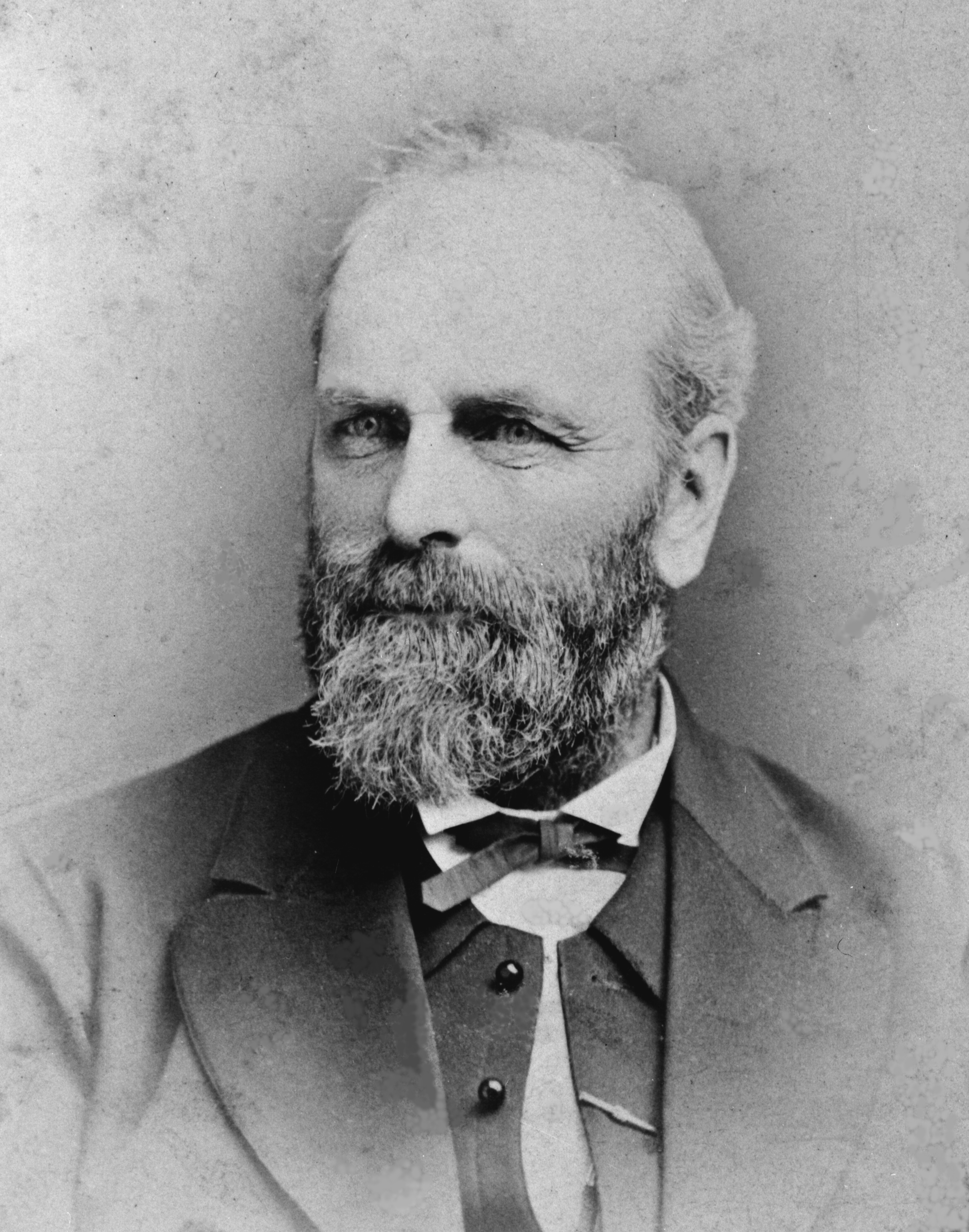
- Portrait c. 1873

Harbormaster of Port of San Francisco
- In office 1862-1864
- Preceded by: W. T. Thompson
- Succeeded by: Marcus Harloe

Member of the California State Assembly from the 8th district
- In office 1871–1873

President of Pacific Coast Steamship Company
- In office 1875-1895
- Succeeded by: C. J. Smith

President of Pacific Coast Railway Company
- In office 1884-1887
- Succeeded by: George C. Perkins

Vice-President of Oceanic Steamship Company
- In office 1882-1899
- Succeeded by: A. B. Spreckels

Personal details
- Born: 20 December 1824 Draycott, Somerset, England
- Died: 12 July 1899 (aged 74) Draycott, Somerset, England
- Party: Republican
- Spouse: Serena Miner Thayer
- Children: 5
- Profession: Entrepreneur

Captain Charles Goodall (20 December 1824 – 12 July 1899) was an American businessman and politician. Along with George C. Perkins and Christopher Nelson, he founded the Pacific Coast Steamship Company. Goodall, Nelson and Perkins controlled much of the shipping industry from Alaska to Mexico during the late 19th century building steamships, wharfs and railroads. At their peak they employed over 2,000 people. Goodall served as Harbormaster of San Francisco from 1862 to 1864 and then served in the California's 8th State Assembly district from 1871 to 1873. In 1885, he became one of the first twenty-five trustees of Stanford University.

== Early life ==
Charles Goodall was born on 20 December 1824 in Draycott, Somerset, England, to George Goodall and Ann Starr. At the age of sixteen, after receiving a basic education and working as a farm laborer for two years, he left rural England and sailed from Liverpool on the ship Adirondack to New York arriving on 11 May 1841. He continued up river to Albany and then by canal to Syracuse. There he found work on farms for two years, the last farm owned by a retired sea-captain named De Cost. When the captain's farm was sold, Goodall made his way to New Bedford and enlisted for a three years' whaling voyage on the ship Milo. He traveled to Western and Cape Verde Islands, Chile, Peru, Bolivia, Alaska, the Sandwich Islands, Society Isles, Masafuero, Juan Fernandez, and many other places. After three years, he entered the merchant service gradually rising through the ranks.

In January 1850, he arrived in San Francisco, where he worked in the gold mines for eight months. In December of the same year he returned to sea visiting Panama, the Fiji, Friendly, New Hebrides and other islands, as well as Australia and the commercial ports of China.

In 1851, on one of the voyages to the Fiji Islands as mate of the whaler William Penn, Goodall met and rescued his future business partner Christopher Nelson, who was shipwrecked there with his crew. Later, Goodall became mate of another ship bound for China and Nelson became first mate of the William Penn. During the voyage of the William Penn, the crew of fifteen Malay natives mutinied, killing the captain and injuring Nelson and others. Nelson and the other four mates regained control of the ship and returned to San Francisco, where Nelson retired from seafaring and settled.

== Career ==
=== Steamboat captain ===
Goodall returned to San Francisco in the fall of 1852. In January 1853, he became captain of the steamboat Rincon for the Sausalito Water and Steam Tug Company carrying fresh water from Sausalito to San Francisco. By 1856, he was captain of the steamboat Hercules and a master mariner. He later became superintendent of the Sausalito Water and Steam Tug Company hiring Christopher Nelson to captain a water boat for the company. From 1862 to 1864, he served as Harbormaster of the Port of San Francisco earning $3,000 a year allowing him to buy stock in the Sausalito Water and Steam Tug Company and become an agent for the company.

=== Shipping merchant ===
By 1867, Goodall and Nelson founded the shipping firm Goodall & Nelson, which specialized in mercantile trade along the Pacific coast. They bought Brennan & Co’s bankrupt interest in the steamer Salinas, a couple of schooners, and various small landings in Monterey Bay and Santa Cruz County. Initially, they shipped produce from Salinas and Santa Cruz to San Francisco on their propeller steamer Salinas. They were agents for the Santa Cruz and Watsonville Line Steamers and for the Sausalito Water Company. In October 1868, they added the new propeller steamer Santa Cruz to their fleet transporting both freight and passengers. The steamer cost them $80,000 to build and was intended for the Santa Cruz and Salinas river trade, but drew too much water at the mouth of the stream. To facilitate more commerce in the region, they built a wharf at Pajaro in Monterey County. In July 1869, they launched their new propeller steamer Monterey built at Cozzen’s shipyard at North Point in San Francisco for $55,000. By 1870, they were shipping merchandise from as far south as Santa Barbara and Gaviota on the steamer Kalorama, which they purchased from the government and brought out from New York, bark-rigged, and turned into a freight boat. Next, they purchased the government gunboat Donald, and being too small for long voyages, was employed between San Francisco and Half Moon Bay. The Santa Cruz and Watsonville Line Steamers was reorganized as Santa Cruz and Lower Coast Steamers. Goodall & Nelson also became proprietors of tugboats Wizard and Water Witch, and agents for Spring Valley Water for shipping, which merged with the Sausalito Water Company.

While serving one term in the California Legislature, Goodall met George C. Perkins, who also served as California Governor and as a United States Senator. In April 1872, Perkins joined Goodall's firm and it became Goodall, Nelson & Perkins. In April 1873, they purchased the Ventura, formerly a war steamer, from the government and refitted her for the southern coast trade at a cost of $100,000. Other steamers in their fleet included the Constantine and Wyanda. Their fleet expanded to include tugboat Minnehaha and they had nine steamships in their fleet.

By 1874, Goodall and his partners had diversified into the railroad business. In March 1874, the California Legislature passed a bill forming the San Luis Obispo and Santa Maria Valley Railroad Company for the construction of a railroad from San Luis Obispo Bay to Santa Maria Valley in Santa Barbara County to begin within one year. Goodall was on the Board of Directors and Christopher Nelson was elected president of the company. On 10 December 1874, Goodall, Nelson, and others formed the Pigeon Point and Pescadero Railroad Company to construct and maintain a narrow-gauge railroad from the high-water mark at Pigeon Point Landing to the town of Pescadero, a distance of about seven miles.

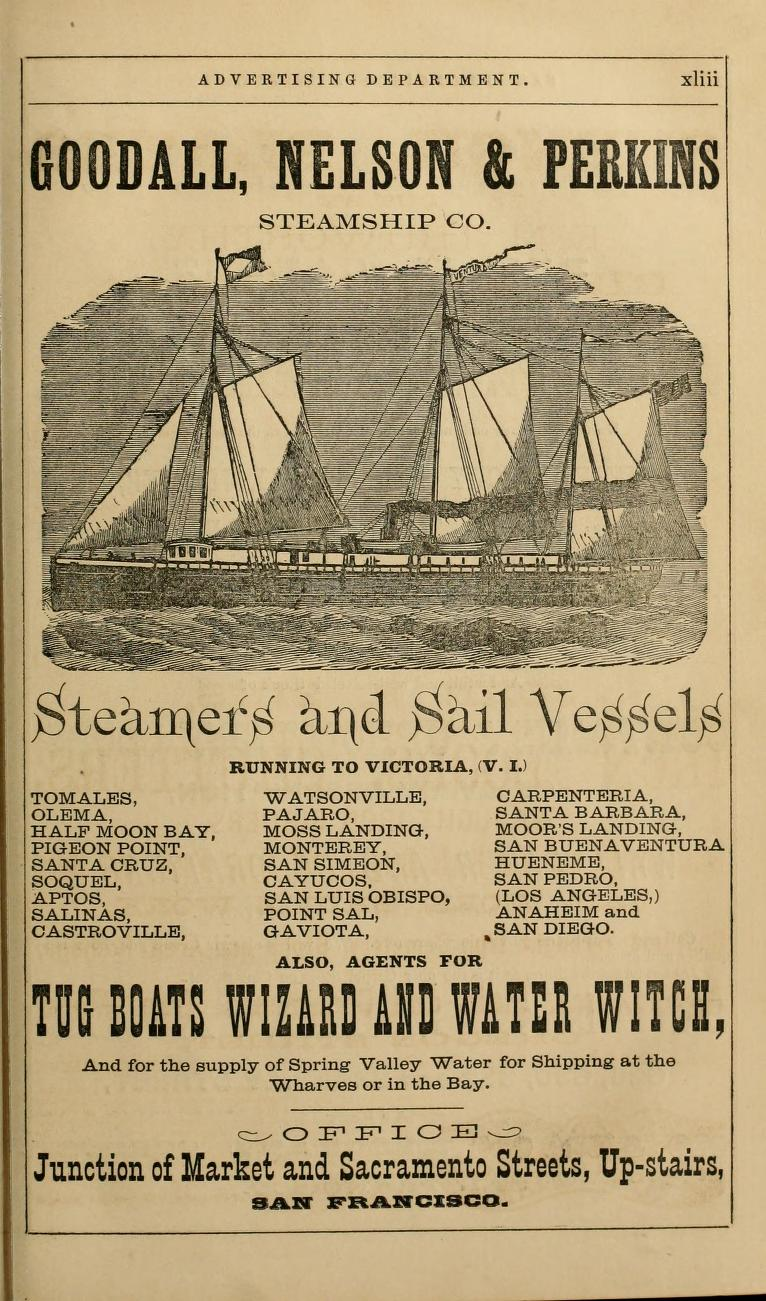
Goodall, Nelson & Perkins Steamship Co.

In January 1875, when the Pacific Mail Steamship Company withdrew from the Pacific coast trade Captain Goodall and his partners purchased its steamships Mohongo, Orizaba, Senator, Pacific, Gypsy, and California for $250,000 and formed the Goodall, Nelson & Perkins Steamship Company. They also purchased the Fidelater from William Kohl. Goodall was president of the Goodall, Nelson & Perkins Steamship Company, Nelson was vice-president, Perkins was treasurer, and Goodall's youngest brother Edwin Goodall was secretary. Through their firm Goodall, Nelson & Perkins, they acted as agents for the Goodall, Nelson & Perkins Steamship Company, along with the Southern Coast (Los Angeles, San Diego, etc.) Line Steamers and Victoria Mail Line. They had sixteen steamers in their fleet and also added tugboat Neptune to their fleet of tugboats. Their steamship company provided Southern Coast routes to Los Angeles, San Diego, and all intermediate ports, and routes to Point Arena, Cuffey's Cove and Little River in Northern California.

In March 1875, construction began on the San Luis Obispo and Santa Maria Valley Railroad. Within a month, Goodall and his partners bought John Harford’s wharf and horse railroad at Port Harford (now Port San Luis) in San Luis Obispo County for $30,000 to eliminate and consolidate the competing San Luis Obispo Railroad. The first leg of the railroad from Port Harford to Avila Beach was finished in February 1876. In April 1876, Nelson applied for a wharf franchise to extend Harford’s wharf at Port Harford to deeper water. The second leg of railroad from Avila Beach to San Luis Obispo was completed in August 1876. San Luis Obispo remained the termitus of the railroad until 1881.

In June 1876, Nelson sold his interest in Goodall, Nelson & Perkins and the firm became Goodall, Perkins & Co. Captain Goodall and his partners reorganized the Goodall, Nelson & Perkins Steamship Company as the Pacific Coast Steamship Company. Goodall continued as president, John Rosenfeld as vice-president, Perkins as treasurer, and Edwin Goodall as secretary. Their fleet included the sidewheel steamships Mohongo, Orizaba, Senator, Ancon, and propellers Los Angeles, San Luis, Santa Cruz, Monterey, Gypsy, Donald, Salinas, Idaho, San Vincent, and Constantine. Their firm continued their other lines of business. In 1878, the Pacific Coast Steamship Company provided routes to Portland and Astoria in Oregon.

In 1881, Goodall was managing the San Luis Obispo and Santa Maria Valley Railroad which was extended to Arroyo Grande and then to Santa Maria in 1882. In August 1881, his firm launched the new freight steamer Bonita on the Southern coast route of the Pacific Coast Steamship Company costing $70,000 to build. In February 1882, his firm Goodall, Perkins & Co. became agents for the Oregon Railway and Navigation Company and owners of the Oregon Coal and Navigation Company working the Coos Bay mines. Charles also became vice-president of the newly formed Oceanic Steamship Company providing service to Honolulu and the Hawaiian Islands. His firm continued their other lines of business. In April 1882, the Pacific Coast Railroad Company was formed to build 80 miles of railroad from Santa Maria to Santa Barbara. Goodall and his brother Edwin Goodall were on the Board of Directors. In September 1882, Goodall and his partners sold a controlling interest of the Pacific Coast Steamship Company and their two railroad companies to Henry Villard's Oregon Improvement Company in New York for $1,000,000 in cash. The San Luis Obispo and Santa Maria Valley Railroad and Pacific Coast Railroad Company were consolidated as the Pacific Coast Railway Company. Goodall became president of the Pacific Coast Railway Company and continued to manage the San Luis Obispo and Santa Maria Valley Railroad. In 1887, the Pacific Coast Steamship Company provided routes to Victoria B. C. and Alaska, in addition to Southern Coast routes to Los Angeles, San Diego, and intermediate ports, routes to Point Arena, Cuffey's Cove and Little River in Northern California, and routes to Portland and Astoria in Oregon.

By 1888, Perkins became president of the Pacific Coast Railway Company. Goodall and his partners continued to act as general agents for the Pacific Coast Railway Company, Pacific Coast Steamship Company, and Oregon Railway and Navigation Company, proprietors of tugboats, and agents for Spring Valley Water for shipping. By 1891, the Oregon Railway and Navigation Company became the Ocean Division Union Pacific System. Goodall and his partners at Goodall, Perkins & Co. became superintendents of the Ocean Division Union Pacific System.

=== Other ventures ===
Goodall was part owner of the Pacific Steam Whaling Company, which operated several steamers and sailing craft in the Pacific Northwest, two salmon canneries in Alaska and The Arctic Oil Works. He also owned real estate in Menlo Park and San Francisco, and a gold mine in Oroville.

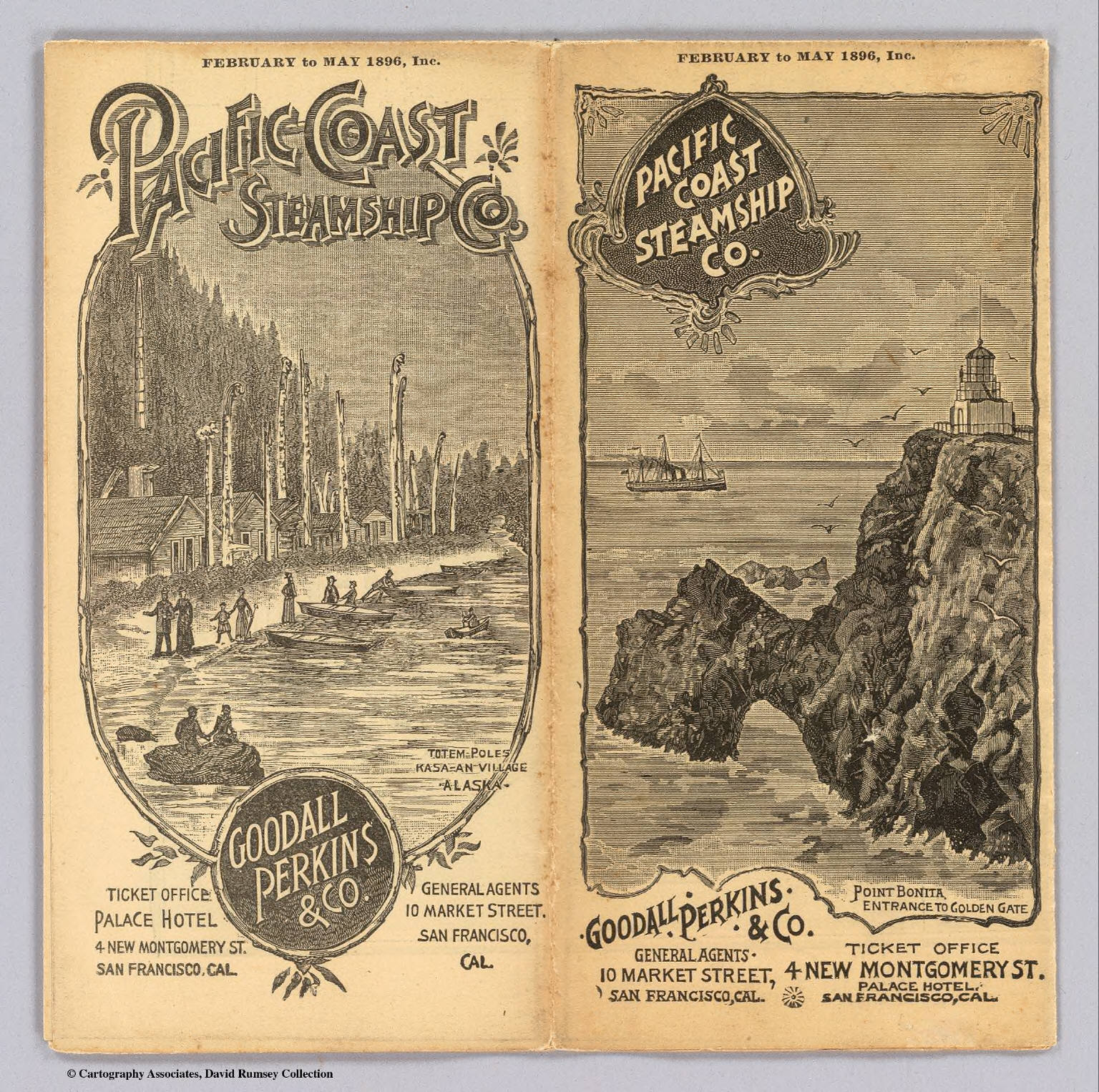
Pacific Coast Steamship Co.

By 1896, he had stepped down as president of the Pacific Coast Steamship Company, but continued to act as vice president of the Oceanic Steamship Company, and agent and superintendent for Goodall, Perkins & Co's other lines of business. His firm Goodall, Perkins & Co. published a travel guide for passengers detailing the various routes of the Pacific Coast Steamship Company. The routes spanned 4,000 miles from Mexico to Alaska. The fleet of steamers included the Queen, Santa Rosa, Umatilla, City of Topeka, Corona, St. Paul, Eureka, Coos Bay, Santa Cruz, Gypsy, State of California, City of Puebla, Walla Walla, Mexico, Pomona, Orizaba, Al-Ki, Bonita, Alex. Duncan, and Yaquina.

In December 1897, he traveled to New York and Philadelphia with his youngest son Harry to find steamships that were suitable for the Alaska trade. The Cottage City and the Curacoa were purchased for the Pacific Coast Steamship Company and the Valencia for the Pacific Steam Whaling Company. All three steamers brought a load of coal from Baltimore to San Francisco making the voyage around Cape Horn. The Valencia, which was a sister steamer to the Caracas, was purchased to replace the Jeanie that was ice-bound in the Arctic. The Union Iron Works in San Francisco was also building the new steamer Senator for Pacific Coast Steamship Company to take part in the Klondike rush.

After his death in 1899, his son Charles Miner Goodall became a partner and officer of Goodall, Perkins & Co. On 15 August 1902, Goodall, Perkins & Co. withdrew from service as general agents of the Pacific Coast Steamship Company. Senator Perkins was occupied with his official duties in Washington, D. C., Edwin Goodall’s health was not good, and the private business of their firm, which included coal properties, gold mining, real estate and shipping, had grown to such proportions that it demanded the entire time of all the members of the firm. Captain C. M. Goodall, the junior member of the firm, was tendered the general management and Edwin Goodall the vice-presidency of the Pacific Coast Steamship Company, but both declined.

=== Controversy ===
On 5 June 1856, Charles P. Duane was arrested by the Vigilance Committee for voter fraud, sentenced to be exiled and transported on Captain Goodall’s steam tug Hercules to a ship bound for Panama. Duane returned to San Francisco in 1860 and filed a lawsuit against Captain Goodall and others. The case against Goodall went to trial two years later. Goodall was acquitted on 10 March 1863.

In June 1876, Goodall’s partner Christopher Nelson sold his interest in Goodall, Nelson & Perkins when his wife filed a suit for divorce on the grounds of adultery. In November 1876, Nelson’s divorce was finalized with the community property, amounting to $70,000, to be equally divided between the two parties. Three years later, Nelson’s ex-wife sued him for misrepresenting the amount of their community property when she discovered that it was worth $400,000 not $70,000 and that Nelson had sold his interest in the firm before the divorce for $100,000 and bought it back after the divorce. She sued for one half of $400,000, less the $36,000 already paid her.

In 1896, the Southern Pacific Railroad wanted the lot of land used by Goodall, Perkins & Co. in San Francisco on the corner of Broadway and Pacific, Drumm and Davis to be developed as a freight yard. During a Harbor Commissioners meeting in March 1896, Captain Goodall told the superintendent of the railroad what he thought of the monopoly claiming that the railroad wanted the north end of the waterfront in order to injure Goodall, Perkins & Co.’s trade and the overall shipping of the port. He argued that the Southern Pacific Railroad received sixty acres of land from the State of California in San Francisco that could be used for their freight yard, while Goodall, Perkins & Co. rented month to month from the State a lot 275 feet square. On that lot they made improvements of $12,000 and had the necessary facilities to make repairs to their vessels. The matter was to be investigated by the Commissioners.

== Personal life ==
=== Societies and trustee ===
While living in Boston as a sailor in the 1840s, Goodall joined Boston Division No. 3 of the Sons of Temperance. In 1856, he went through all chairs of Golden Gate Division No. 12 of the Sons of Temperance in San Francisco. He abstained from both drink and tobacco his entire life even denying his eldest son a share of the residue of his estate “because he [could not] reform from the liquor habit.”

Goodall was a devoted member of the Methodist Episcopal Church. From 1865 to 1868, he was a trustee of the Howard Street Methodist Episcopal Church, president of the Board of Trustees for the church, and superintendent of the Sabbath School for the church. From 1869 to 1880, he continued as a trustee of the Howard Street Methodist Episcopal Church.

In 1871, he was elected president of the Young Men’s Christian Association (YMCA) in San Francisco. In 1887 and 1888, he was on the Board of Directors for the YMCA.

From 1874 to 1889, he was a trustee of the San Francisco Port Society, established in March 1860 for the moral improvement of seamen and others connected with the sea in the port of San Francisco. A house of worship was erected for the seaman on the corner of Sacramento and Drumm streets.

From 1878 to 1880, he was a trustee of the San Francisco Chamber of Commerce. Then from 1887 to 1889, he served as a vice-president of the San Francisco Chamber of Commerce.

From 1885 to 1886, he was a commissioner of Golden Gate Park receiving no compensation. He was offered the vacant position when ex-Governor Stanford declined the honor. Improvements planned included building a highway one hundred feet wide, with elevated walks on either side of the roadway from Conservatory Valley to the sea.

In November 1885, he was named as one of the first twenty-five trustees of what would become Stanford University in Palo Alto, California. Leland Stanford deeded 87,000 acres of land for the endowment and organization of the University.

From 1884 to 1885, Goodall was director of the San Francisco Church Extension Society of the Methodist Episcopal Church. It was formed for the purpose of founding churches, establishing Sunday schools and places of worship, and relieving over-burdened churches in the City and County of San Francisco. From 1886 to 1890, he was president of the organization. From 1891 to 1893, he was both president and trustee of the organization. From 1894 to 1898, he continued as president of the organization. And in 1899, he was made honorary president and trustee of the San Francisco Church Extension Society.

From 1884 to 1886, he served on the Executive Committee of the Advisory Committee for the San Francisco Veterans’ Home, established on 7 March 1882 . The object was to found a home for the relief and support of officers, soldiers, marines and sailors who honorably served and who were in indigent circumstances or incapable of self-support.

From 1891 to 1896, he was president of the Methodist Social Union of San Francisco. No details given on the purpose of the organization.

From 1895 to 1899, Goodall and his partner George C. Perkins were councilors for the Geographical Society of the Pacific, established 11 September 1891. It was located in the Academy of Sciences building. The object was the accumulation of geographical knowledge, and the dissemination of it for the benefit of commerce, navigation and society in general.

At the time of his death, he was a trustee of Stanford University and the University of the Pacific.

=== Family life ===
Goodall married Serena Miner Thayer of Skaneateles, New York, on 20 February 1856 in San Francisco, California, at the Powell Street Methodist Episcopal Church. She was sister of Sanford Thayer, a well known portrait painter of Syracuse, New York.

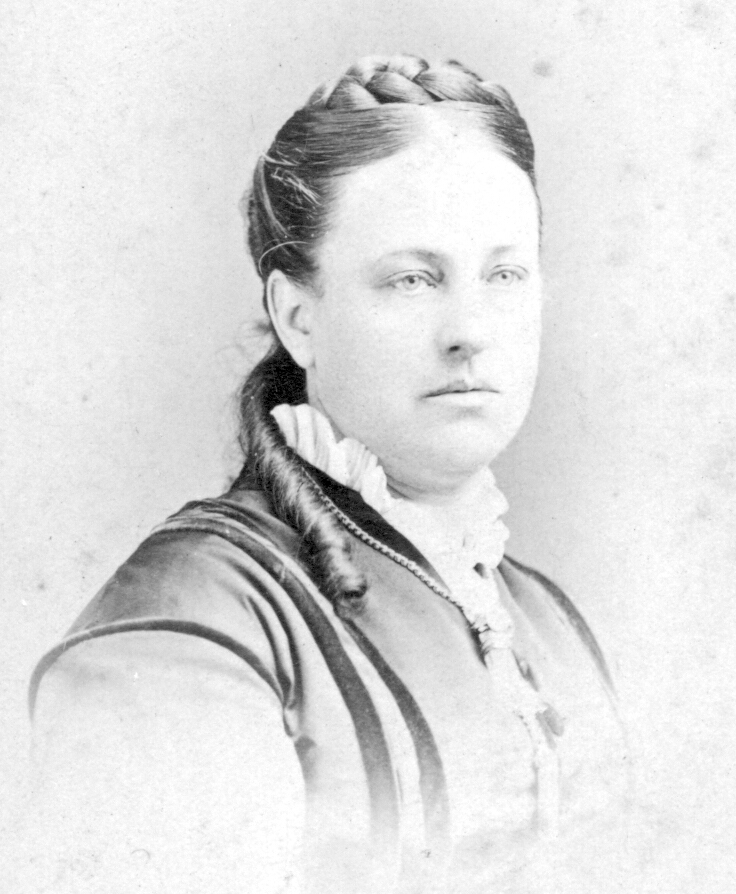
Serena M. Goodall c. 1874

For twenty years, Goodall's wife Serena was president of the Women's Missionary Society of the Pacific Coast organized by Rev. Otis Gibson to rescue Chinese women from slavery and prostitution. Rev. Gibson's wife wrote of Serena "She was large-hearted, broad-minded, genial, generous and kind. She was beloved by all who were so fortunate as to know her. She planned wisely for the Society, and the school girls were indebted to her thoughtfulness for many a pleasant outing and picnic, at a time that it was considered perilous to let them be seen abroad. She was intelligent, brave and energetic, and was not ashamed to be known as the friend of the Chinese." Charles Goodall Lee was named in honor of Captain Goodall after Lee's mother was freed from a probable life of slavery in California due to Serena's work. In 1891, Serena applied for appointment as guardian of Hong Tow, a Chinese girl who was rescued by the Society. Serena was devoted to the cause of religion and charity and contributed her time to the missionary societies of the Methodist Church, the Chinese Mission, the Deaconesses' Home, the Ladies' Protection and Relief Society, the Church Extension Society and other church organizations. She also served as president for the Woman’s Foreign Missionary Society of San Francisco and as a vice-president for the Woman’s Christian Suffrage Society organized in 1884 to secure the passage of a bill granting the right to vote for all the women citizens of California.

Goodall and his wife Serena had five children that lived to adulthood, three sons and two daughters. All three sons worked for his firm Goodall, Perkins & Co. Samuel Edward Goodall (1857-1909) worked as a waterman, purser, clerk, mechanical engineer, and finally a foreman in the machine shop of the Pacific Coast Steamship Company. Charles Miner Goodall (1859-1922) captained the tugboat Minnehaha and the steamship Ancon before becoming a master mariner. He was also vice-president of the Oregon Coal and Navigation Company. The youngest son Harry Walter Goodall (1873-1930) was an agent and vice-president of his own shipping firm called Piper, Aden, Goodall Co.

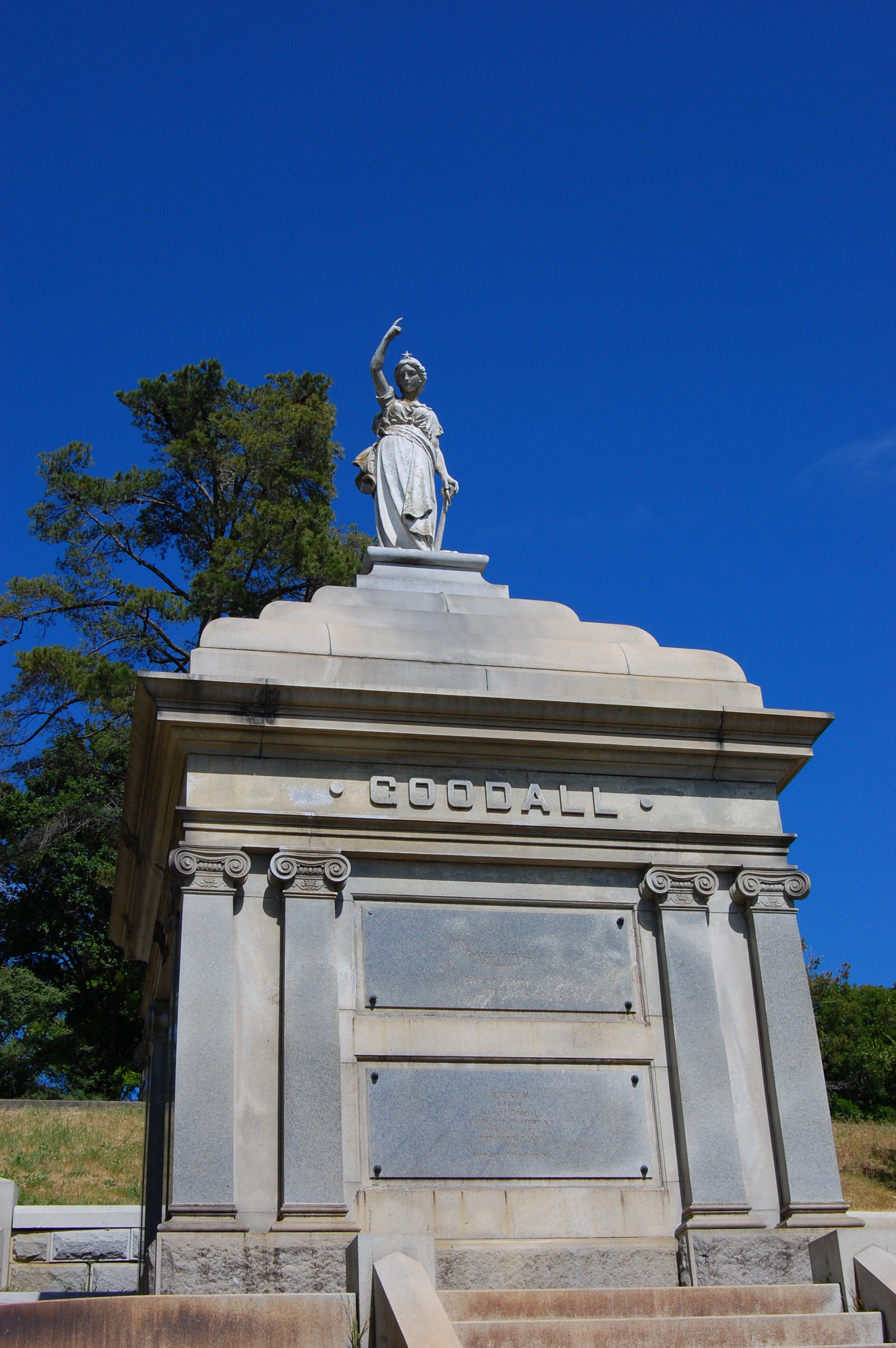
Goodall Tomb

Goodall's wife Serena died of diabetes on 17 April 1893 in San Francisco, California. Many people from San Jose, California attended her funeral because of her unselfish and generous devotion to the University of the Pacific through gifts and fund-raising efforts.

He married the widow Caroline (Roberts) Hathaway, who was sixteen years his junior, on 7 September 1895 in San Francisco, California.

== Death ==
In June 1899, Goodall and his second wife traveled to Europe with the intent of touring Draycott, England, where he was born, Wales, where she was born, and the Continent of Europe. In Draycott, he became ill and died on 12 July 1899. He was 74 years old.

At the time of his death, his estate was worth over a million dollars. His property in Menlo Park was divided among his children, his second wife Caroline inherited their home on the SE corner of McAllister and Pierce in San Francisco, and various relatives received money. The remainder of the estate was divided equally between his widow and children.

His remains arrived in San Francisco on 8 August 1899 nearly a month after his death. Two days later, George C. Perkins gave an emotional eulogy at the funeral saying that his friend and business partner Captain Goodall was "one of the noblest men ever born" and that "he would have been a Gladstone if he had been a statesman."
