= Charles Miner Goodall =

American businessman

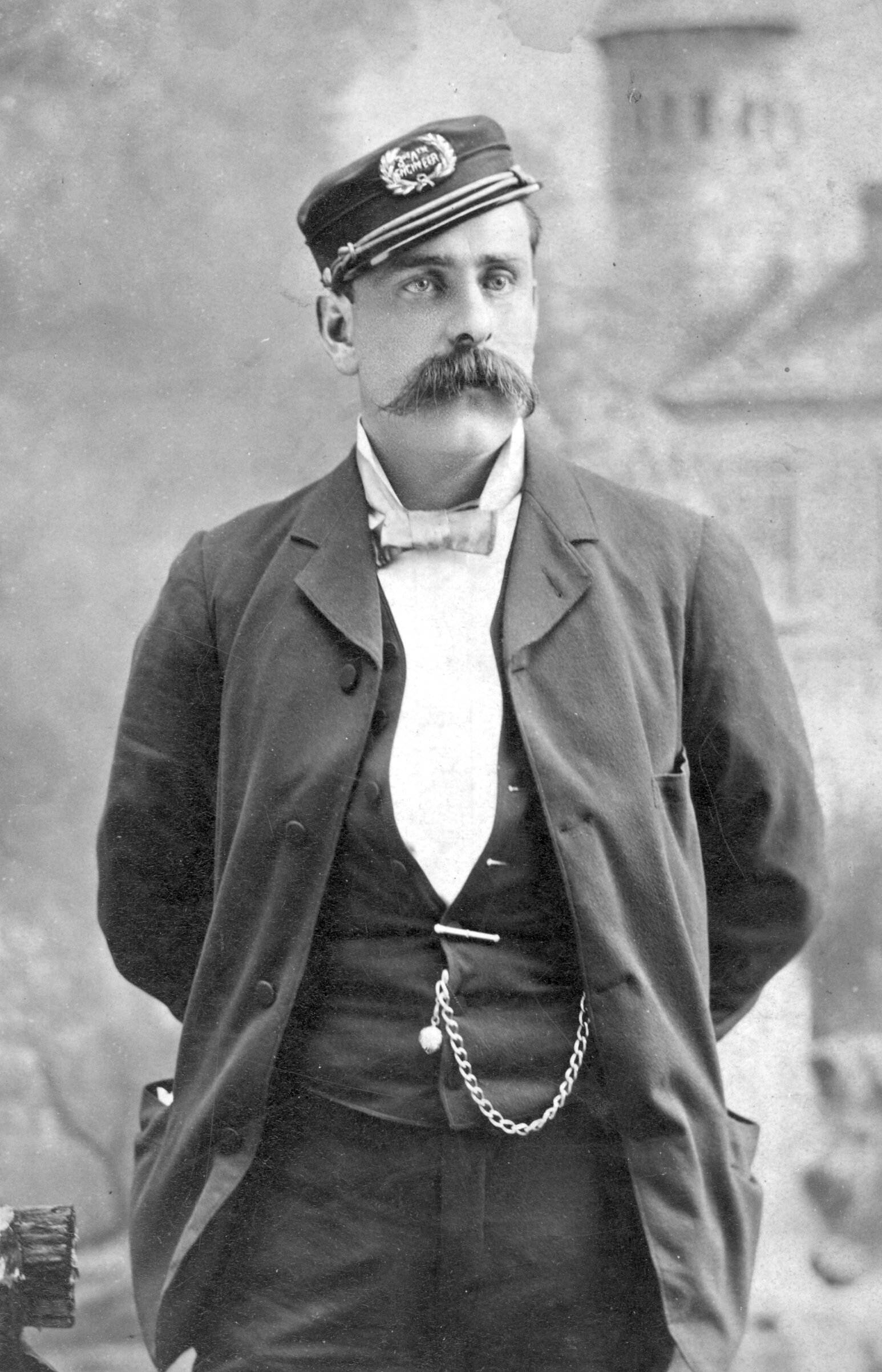
- c. 1884
- Born: 11 November 1859; San Francisco, San Francisco, California, US
- Died: 31 October 1922 (aged 62); Oakland, Alameda, California, US
- Occupations: Steamship captain; Businessman
- Spouse(s): Rose E Williams; Marian (Cullen) Comstock
- Children: 2

Charles Miner Goodall (11 November 1859 – 31 October 1922) was an American businessman, steamship captain, and master mariner. He was the son of Captain Charles Goodall, one of the founders of the Pacific Coast Steamship Company.

== Early life and career ==
Charles was born on 11 November 1859 in San Francisco, California, to Charles Goodall and Serena Miner Thayer. His middle name Miner was the family name of his mother's maternal grandfather, Luke Miner.

In 1876, when Charles was sixteen, he began working for his father's firm Goodall, Perkins & Co. at 10 Market in San Francisco, California, captaining the tugboat Minnehaha. In 1880, he was mate of the steamship Gypsy. In 1883, he was captain of the Pacific Coast Steamship Company's wharf. In 1884, he was captain of the steamship Ancon shipping merchandise and passengers to ports along the Pacific Coast. By 1885, he had achieved the title of Master Mariner.

Charles was a Lieutenant commander of the navy reserve. He commanded several navy ships in their unofficial trial trips from the shipyard of Union Iron Works in San Francisco, California. In 1888, he commanded the USS Charleston in its trial trip. As a “Native Son” he was an appropriate choice to command the first man-of-war built on the Pacific coast. In 1890, he commanded the USS San Francisco in its trial trip from San Francisco to Point Conception and back. In 1893, he commanded the USS Olympia in its trial trip, cruising over twenty-one knots an hour on the return trip from Point Conception to San Francisco despite a head wind. Charles said of the Olympia “I think she is not only the fastest vessel in the United States navy, but the handsomest man-of-war in the world.”

In September 1893, Charles resigned as leader of the naval reserve to devote his entire time to business at Goodall, Perkins & Co. He was lieutenant commander of the Naval Battalion for the National Guard of California.

In 1894, Charles became vice-president of the Oregon Coal and Navigation Company. His uncle Edwin Goodall was President of the company and a partner of Goodall, Perkins & Co.

In May 1896, Charles commanded the USS Oregon in its unofficial trial trip from San Francisco to Point Conception and back.

After the death of his father in July 1899, Charles became a partner and officer of Goodall, Perkins & Co. In 1901, Charles became vice-president of the Pacific Coast Steamship Company and the Pacific Coast Railway Company.

After the death of his uncle Edwin Goodall in February 1909, Charles became President of the Oregon Coal and Navigation Company for two years before the company was sold.

== Personal life ==
Charles married Rose E Williams in late 1881 in San Francisco, California. They were the parents of two sons. By 1889, Charles lived with his family in Oakland, California.

His wife Rose died on 22 July 1894 in Oakland, California.

Charles married the widow Marian (Cullen) Comstock on 26 May 1898. He adopted her only child and daughter. They had no children of their own.

Charles died on 31 October 1922 in Oakland, California after a long illness. His estate was valued at $247,042.
