= Port Harford, California =

Coordinates: 35°11′57″N 120°43′15″W

Port Harford is a former town in San Luis Obispo County, California, US. It was established in 1871 after John Harford built a pier and a horse drawn railroad to span the two miles between his pier and Avila (now called Avila Beach). In the 1880s the Pacific Coast Railway stopped in Port Harford on its route from San Luis Obispo to Santa Maria. All that remains of the original town are the 1919 pier and a wooden warehouse canopy that now houses Olde Port Inn Restaurant.
