= Symphoromyia hirta =

Scientific classification
- Domain: Eukaryota
- Kingdom: Animalia
- Phylum: Arthropoda
- Class: Insecta
- Order: Diptera
- Family: Rhagionidae
- Genus: Symphoromyia
- Species: S. hirta

Binomial name
- Symphoromyia hirta Johnson, 1897

Synonyms
- Symphoromyia flavipalpis Adams, 1904

Species of fly

Symphoromyia hirta is a species of snipe flies in the family Rhagionidae.
