= Symphoromyia cinerea =

Scientific classification
- Domain: Eukaryota
- Kingdom: Animalia
- Phylum: Arthropoda
- Class: Insecta
- Order: Diptera
- Family: Rhagionidae
- Genus: Symphoromyia
- Species: S. cinerea

Binomial name
- Symphoromyia cinerea Johnson, 1903

Species of fly

Symphoromyia cinerea is a species of snipe flies in the family Rhagionidae.
