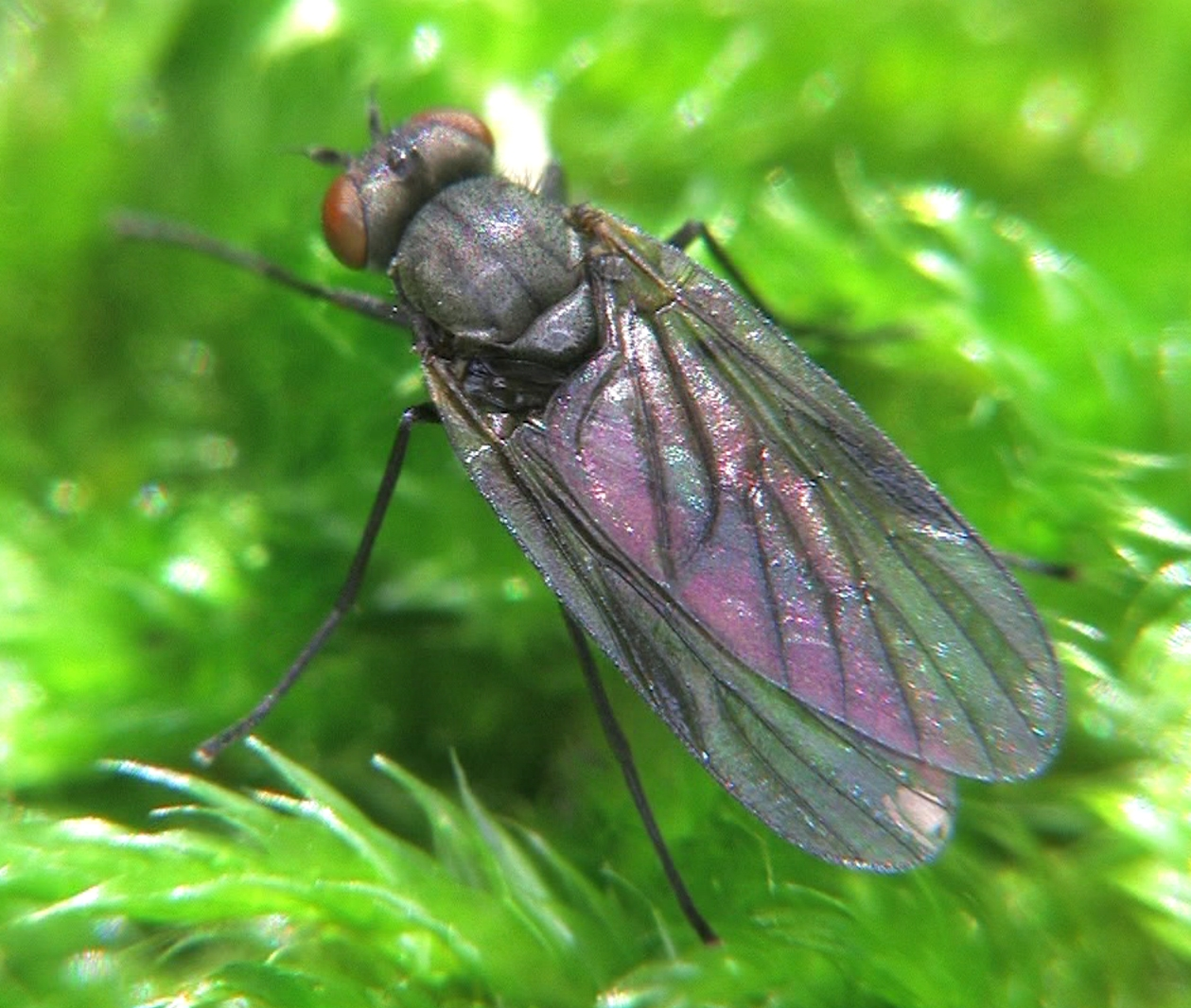
- Ptiolina sp. on moss

Scientific classification
- Kingdom: Animalia
- Phylum: Arthropoda
- Clade: Pancrustacea
- Class: Insecta
- Order: Diptera
- Family: Rhagionidae
- Subfamily: Spaniinae
- Genus: Ptiolina; Stæger in Zetterstedt, 1842

Type species
- Leptis obscura Fallén, 1814

Synonyms
- Eurytion Jaennicke, 1867; Tyolina Walker, 1848

= Ptiolina =

Genus of flies

Oviposition of Ptiolina sp. on moss

Ptiolina is a genus of snipe flies of the family Rhagionidae. It is found in Northwest Europe, where it prefers woodland areas, and North America.

Ptiolina species are delicate to fairly robust flies, and range from 3 to 10 mm in length. They are entirely black or brown in colour.

== Species ==
- Ptiolina alapponica Makarkin & Sidorenko, 2001
- Ptiolina alberta Leonard, 1931
- Ptiolina angusta Curran, 1931
- Ptiolina attenuata Nagatomi, 1986
- Ptiolina dudai Lindner, 1942
- Ptiolina edeta (Walker, 1849)
- Ptiolina grandis Frey, 1918
- Ptiolina latifrons Nagatomi, 1986
- Ptiolina leleji Makarkin & Sidorenko, 2001
- Ptiolina longipilosa Nagatomi, 1986
- Ptiolina mallochi Hardy & McGuire, 1947
- Ptiolina nagatomii Makarkin & Sidorenko, 2001
- Ptiolina nervosa Nagatomi, 1986
- Ptiolina nitida Wahlberg, 1854
- Ptiolina nitidifrons Hardy & McGuire, 1947
- Ptiolina obscura (Fallén, 1814) – black-fringe moss-snipefly
- Ptiolina obsoleta Leonard, 1931
- Ptiolina paradoxa (Jaennicke, 1867)
- Ptiolina pelliticornis Becker, 1900
- Ptiolina shimai Nagatomi, 1985
- Ptiolina sphaeralis Nagatomi, 1986
- Ptiolina vicina Hardy & McGuire, 1947
- Ptiolina zonata Hardy & McGuire, 1947
