= Symphoromyia sackeni =

Scientific classification
- Domain: Eukaryota
- Kingdom: Animalia
- Phylum: Arthropoda
- Class: Insecta
- Order: Diptera
- Family: Rhagionidae
- Genus: Symphoromyia
- Species: S. sackeni

Binomial name
- Symphoromyia sackeni Aldrich, 1915

Species of fly

Symphoromyia sackeni is a species of snipe flies in the family Rhagionidae.
