= Henry Barber (cricketer) =

English cricketer

Personal information
- Full name: Henry William Barber
- Born: 5 November 1841; Bloomsbury, London
- Died: 10 July 1924 (aged 82); Draycott, Somerset
- Batting: Right-handed
- Bowling: Right-arm fast

Domestic team information
- Years: Team
- 1861–1864: Kent

Career statistics
Competition	First-class
Matches	13
Runs scored	218
Batting average	10.38
100s/50s	0/0
Top score	45
Balls bowled	24
Wickets	0
Bowling average	–
5 wickets in innings	–
10 wickets in match	–
Best bowling	–
Catches/stumpings	4/–
- Source: Cricinfo, 8 March 2017

Henry William Barber (5 November 1841 – 10 July 1924) was an English amateur cricketer. He played thirteen first-class matches for Kent County Cricket Club and the Gentlemen of Kent between 1861 and 1864. Barber attended The King's School, Canterbury.

== Bibliography ==
- Carlaw, Derek (2020). Kent County Cricketers, A to Z: Part One (1806–1914) (PDF). Cardiff: ACS.
