= James Carroll (captain) =

- Born: c. 1840; Ireland
- Died: May 19, 1912 (aged 71 or 72); Seattle
- Occupation: Steamboat captain
- Known for: Bringing the first large steamboat to Alaska

James Carroll (c. 1840 – May 19, 1912) was an Irish American steamboat captain who brought the first large steamboat to Alaska.

== Early years ==
Born in Ireland, Carroll came to the U.S. when he was a year old, settling in Kendall County, Illinois with his parents. At age 16, he moved to Chicago and became a sailor.

== Career ==
Carroll spent two years on the Great Lakes before venturing to New York. He became connected with the United States Merchant Marine in trips he made to Japan and China. He sailed to California, the Sandwich Islands, the South Sea Islands and many European ports. In 1863, he received his first promotion. In 1865, he returned to San Francisco and for many years sailed the Pacific Ocean waters. Carroll was connected with the National Steamship Company. In 1866, he was the second officer on the brig, Swallow. He received his first command in 1870. He commanded the Colorado, the Pelican, the Great Republic, the California (afterward known as the Eureka), the Idaho, and the Ancon, .

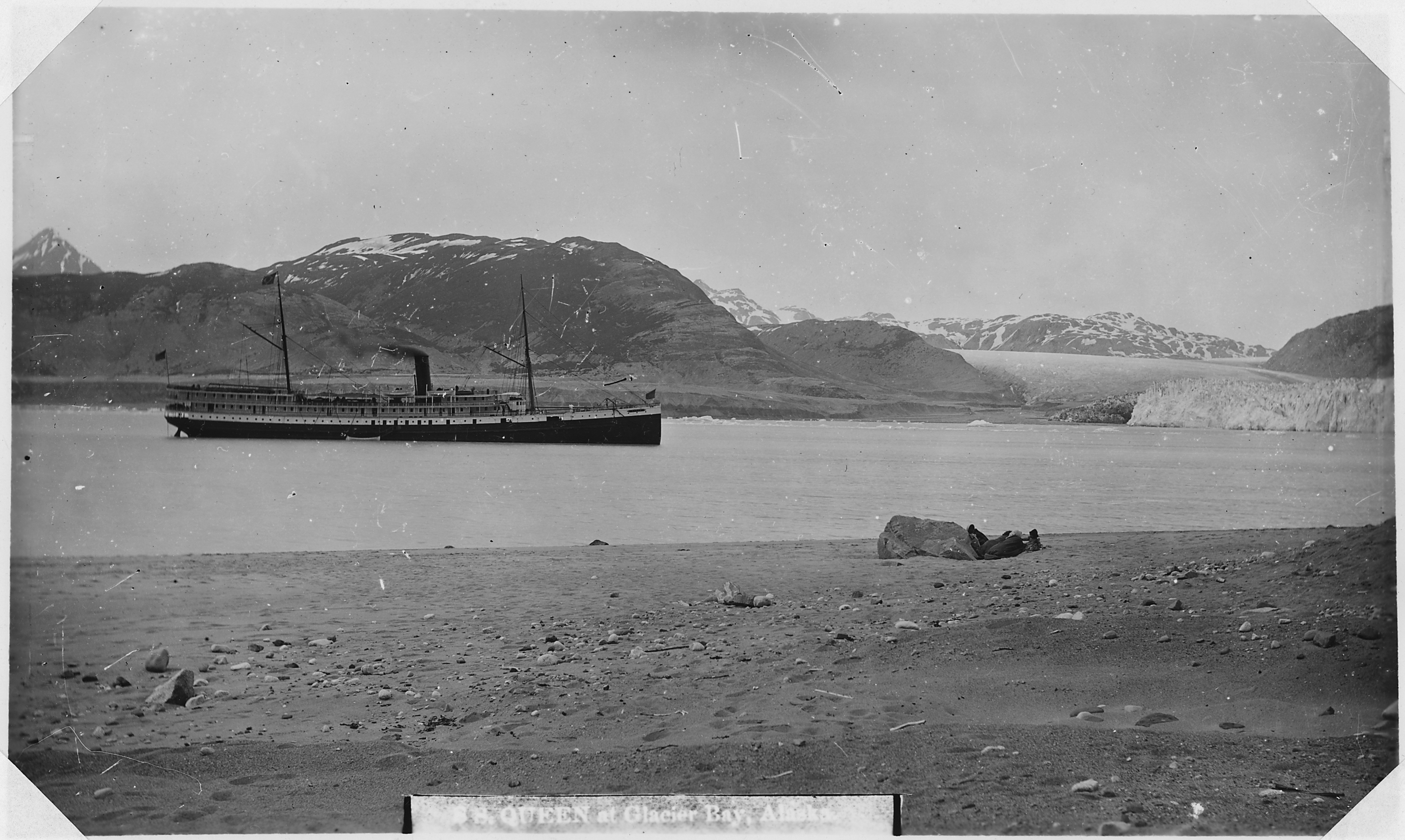
SS Queen at Glacier Bay

In 1878, Carroll became employed in the Alaska service, carrying tourists to Alaska from Portland, Oregon and Seattle, Washington. With E. C. Hughes, N. A. Fuller and George E. Piltz, Carroll equipped the Juneau and the Harris. Throughout his seafaring career, Carroll discovered a few sunken reefs. For a quarter of a century, he was with the Pacific Coast Steamship Company. While sailing to Alaska, he made the acquaintance of many prominent and wealthy men from the east and in 1891, appeared before Congress, representing a syndicate of moneyed men, with an offer of US$14,000,000 to buy Alaska. He was the first master of the Queen and was the first to take her through the Wrangell Narrows; Carroll Glacier is located at Queen Inlet in Glacier Bay National Park and Preserve.

In 1898, Carroll retired from seafaring, becoming an agent for the Alaska Commercial Company and for the Northern Lakes & Rivers Navigation Company. Eventually, he returned to the Pacific Coast Steamship Company to command the new steamer, Spokane, but retired again about 1906. He was also a representative of the Rodman Bay mines on Baranof Island, where the company’ operated a sixty-stamp mill and seven miles of railroad. He ran outfitting businesses from Seattle, Skagway, and Nome, Alaska. Carroll and M. W. Murry built the Carroll-Murry Wharf in Juneau, which, until 1894, was the only one in that city. The Carroll wharf was later renamed in his honor. He was also Alaska's first mailboat captain.

== Personal life ==
Carroll married Dorothy Bowington (died 1900), and of their children only one survived, John. In 1903, he wed Elizabeth A. Reid of Victoria, British Columbia, Canada. Carroll was a Mason, as well as a member of the Knights of Pythias, the Odd Fellows, and the Elks. He belonged to the Master Marines Association and the Masters and Pilots Association of San Francisco. Carroll was the first delegate from Alaska to the US Congress.

Carroll died in his Seattle residence on May 19, 1912. Carroll Way, a public stairway, is named posthumously after him.
