= Draycott, Somerset =

Village in Somerset, England

Coordinates: 51°15′23″N 2°45′03″W

Draycott
- Village
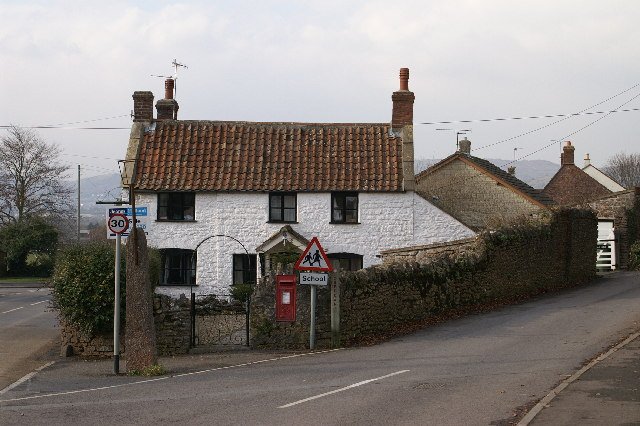
- Draycott

- Location within Somerset
- OS grid reference: ST477510
- Civil parish: Rodney Stoke
- Unitary authority: Somerset Council
- Ceremonial county: Somerset
- Region: South West
- Country: England
- Sovereign state: United Kingdom
- Post town: CHEDDAR
- Postcode district: BS27
- Dialling code: 01934
- Police: Avon and Somerset
- Fire: Devon and Somerset
- Ambulance: South Western
- UK Parliament: Wells and Mendip Hills

Draycott is a village in Somerset, England, neighbouring the village of Cheddar on the southern edge of the Mendip Hills Area of Outstanding Natural Beauty. It is now the larger village in the civil parish of Rodney Stoke.

== History ==
There is some evidence of occupation of the site in the Iron Age including an unfinished earthwork enclosure on the hill above Draycott.

The village was listed in the Domesday Book of 1086 as Draicote, meaning 'The dray shelter' from the Old English dragan and cot. Another derivation is from the Brythonic from Tre meaning settlement and Coet meanings woods.

== Geography ==
Close to the village is the Draycott Sleights nature reserve which has been designated as a Site of Special Scientific Interest.

Halesland Airfield is situated just to the north of the village and is home to the Mendip Gliding Club. Draycott is still a major strawberry producer and the now-disused railway line that ran through the village was called the Strawberry Line. The station opened in 1878 and the line closed in the early 1960s. The pub located opposite the old railway station is called The Strawberry Special.

The A371 road runs north to south through the village's longest axis. Despite being classified as an A-road, it significantly narrows at certain points along the southern part of the village and has been the cause of congestion during times of increased traffic flow such as during the summer tourist season.

== Church ==
The church of St Peter was built in 1861 by the architect Charles Edmund Giles. It is a Grade II listed building. The majority of the stonework is that known locally as 'Draycott Marble', a dolomitic conglomerate with a pronounced pinkish tinge, that was quarried quite close by at Draycott quarry. Notable interior features are the stained glass east windows, the fine wrought-iron rood screen (1894), and the neo-Norman font by William Burges.

Controversially, in 2006, the church attempted to sell the font for £110,000. The Rev. Stanley Price contended that the sale was essential to meet a repair and restoration bill of an estimated £170,000. The sale was initially approved by the Chancellor of the Diocese of Bath and Wells, Timothy J Briden but permission was subsequently refused when the Victorian Society appealed to the Court of Arches, one of the Church of England's highest courts. The court found "no compelling need to dispose of the font had been demonstrated" and concluded that, if allowed, "much of which adorns and adds interest, both historically and architecturally, to our churches would be lost to future generations."

== Notable residents ==
- Henry Barber (1841–1924), English amateur cricketer, died in Draycott.
- Barry Rose (b. 1934), English choir trainer and organist.
- Charles Goodall (1824-1899), American businessman and co-founder of the Pacific Coast Steamship Company, born and died in Draycott.
