= Symphoromyia immaculata =

Scientific classification
- Kingdom: Animalia
- Phylum: Arthropoda
- Class: Insecta
- Order: Diptera
- Family: Rhagionidae
- Genus: Symphoromyia
- Species: S. immaculata

Binomial name
- Symphoromyia immaculata (Meigen, 1804)

Species of fly

Symphoromyia immaculata is a Palearctic species of snipe fly in the family Rhagionidae.
