= T. H. Paul =

Thomas Haig Paul (March 10, 1820 – May 15, 1890) was a locomotive manufacturer in Frostburg, Maryland. He is credited with building the first narrow-gauge locomotive in the United States in 1864.

== Biography ==
He was born as one of nine children to Agnes (née Haig) and Alexander Paul in New York City. His parents and two older siblings had come to the United States from Scotland in 1818. The family soon moved to Paterson, New Jersey, where he began his apprenticeship as a mechanic.

He served as the "Master Mechanic" for the Mount Savage, Maryland, shop of the Cumberland and Pennsylvania Railroad from 1854 to 1855.

Paul married Marian M. Neff (May 31, 1834 – May 15, 1890), daughter of Joanna (née Small) and John Neff, in Reading, Pennsylvania, on November 7, 1854. The couple had two children, John Thomas Haig Paul (January 30, 1856) and Ella Marian Paul (April 23, 1857). Ella married, on April 8, 1885, Howard Hitchins, son of Adam E. Hitchins (co-founder of Hitchins Brothers Company, along with his brother Owen, a mercantile company in Frostburg).

Thomas H. Paul and Son Iron Works opened in 1855 to build mining cars and mining machinery. The "son" was John Thomas Haig Paul.

Paul built a narrow gauge (three feet) locomotive weighing eight tons for the Franklin Coal Company in 1871.

With the Depression of 1882–85, the company ran into financial trouble in early 1883. The company moved from Allegany County to Baltimore in February 1883. At the time, the company owed Betts Machine Company approximately US$5,000. Betts, falling into financial troubles of their own because of the depression, filed a lawsuit against Thomas H. Paul & Sons (including principals Thomas H. Paul and John T. H. Paul) to collect the money owed to them. Betts also accused Paul of transferring assets in order to hide them from creditors and to avoid being served legal papers. On May 10, 1884, the foundry in Frostburg was sold by the Allegany County sheriff's department.

In June 1889, Paul traveled to Trinidad, Colorado, to see about either opening a branch foundry there or moving the company entirely. Instead, a branch foundry was constructed in Sioux City, Iowa, in August 1889.

The property for the foundry and residence of the Paul family was sold in February 1898.

He received a patent, number 330,261, for a Planer-Chuck, to plane the edges on locomotive links, on November 10, 1885, and then number 463,282, for a "Gas Stove and Radiator" on November 17, 1891. Paul and his son obtained a patent (filed December 12, 1893), number 530,237, for a gas engine on December 4, 1894. The patent was unique in the use of rocker arms and intake and exhaust values, providing a simpler value-control mechanism.

Marian M. Paul died of dropsy in Frostburg on May 15, 1890, at the age of 55. Paul's son, John Thomas Haig Paul, died in Chicago, Illinois, on March 4, 1929.
