= Idaho (1866 ship) =

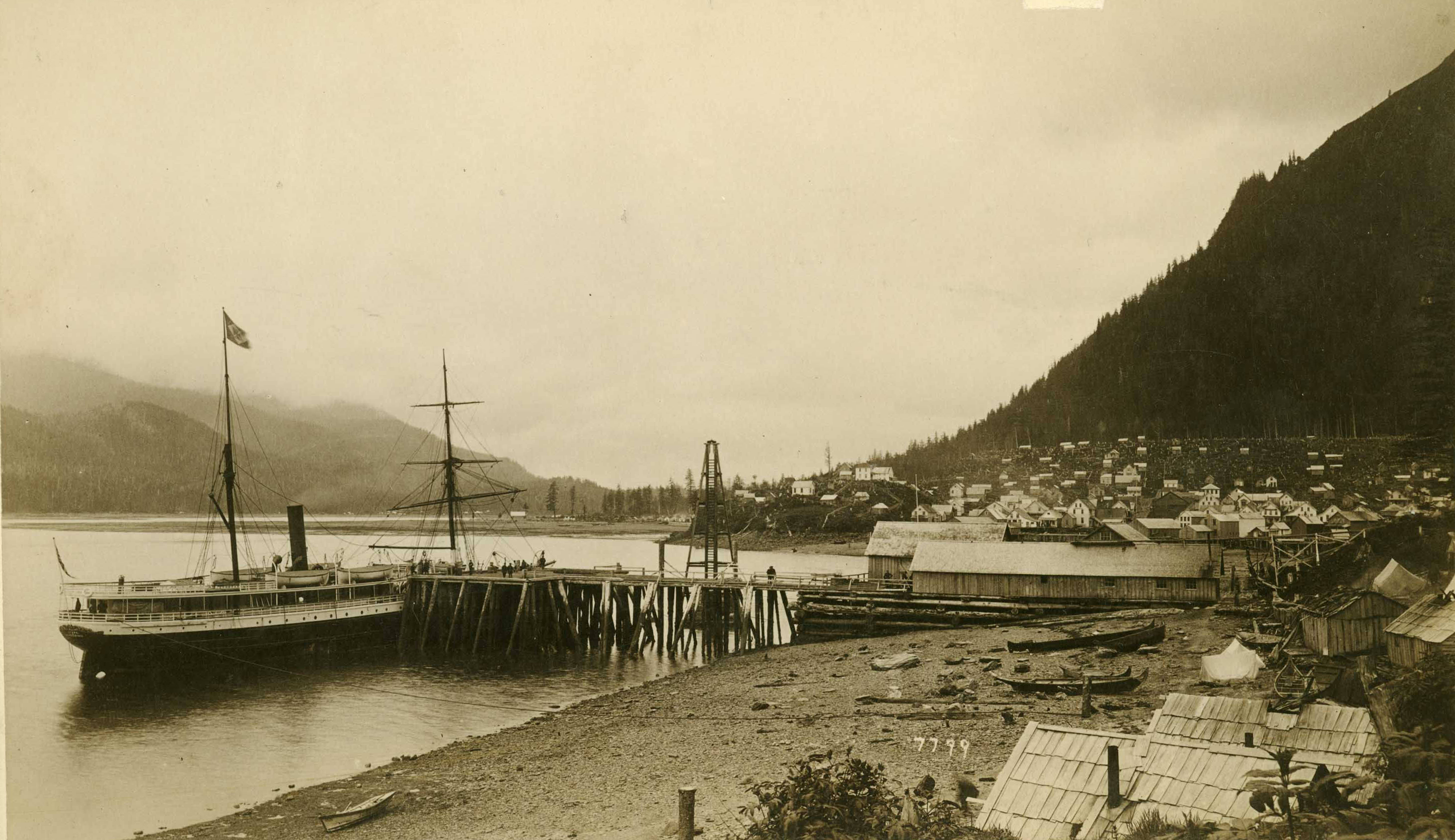
- Idaho docked in Juneau, Alaska in 1887

History

United States
- Name: Idaho
- Builder: George F. and John Patten, shipbuilders
- Cost: $250,000
- Launched: August 11, 1866
- Homeport: San Francisco, California
- Identification: Signal letters H.K.G.Q.
- Fate: Wrecked near Race Rocks, British Columbia, November 29, 1889

General characteristics
- Class & type: Steamship
- Tonnage: 800 net tons
- Tons burthen: 1077 tons
- Length: 198 ft (60 m)
- Beam: 31 ft (9.4 m)
- Depth: 17 ft (5.2 m)
- Installed power: 350 horsepower
- Propulsion: Propeller
- Sail plan: Brigantine
- Capacity: 117 cabin passengers and 130 steerage passengers plus 900 tons of freight
- Crew: 42
- Notes: Official number 12045

Idaho was a wooden steamship built for Pacific Coast passenger and freight service. She was launched in 1866 and wrecked in 1889. She was one of the first ocean-going steamships to provide regular service to the northwest coast of North America.

== Construction ==
Idaho was built in Bath, Maine and launched on August 11, 1866. She was a wooden ship, built of oak, yellow pine, and hackmatack. She was 198 feet (60 meters) long, with a beam of 31 feet (9.4 meters) and a draft of 17 feet (5.2 meters). She displaced 1,077 gross tons. Her primary propulsion was provided by a coal-fired steam engine which had a single 44" cylinder and a 3' stroke. The engine turned a fifty-six foot-long shaft to drive a single propeller 12 1/2' in diameter. She also had two masts and could sail. One report said she cost $250,000 to build. She was built in the shipyard of George F. and John Patten, a partnership between two brothers.

As originally constructed, her interior spaces included forty three-berth staterooms, a dining salon which could seat 100, a ladies' cabin, and a gentlemen's smoking room. An 1880 refit gave slightly more space for cargo, reducing cabin capacity to 100 and steerage capacity to 125 people.

== Anchor Line (1867) ==
By 1865 a cosy duopoly existed between the California Steam Navigation Company and the California, Oregon, and Mexico Steamship Company for sailings from San Francisco to points north. The duopolists charged $45 for a cabin and $25 for a steerage berth on the San Francisco - Portland route. Captain Jarvis Patton founded a competing steamship company, the Anchor Line, to challenge the duopoly. He began service with his new ship, Montana, and cut rates to $15 for a cabin and $5 for steerage. The two existing competitors dropped their prices in response, hurting profitability for all.

The Anchor Line's second vessel, Idaho, sailed from Maine for the West Coast on October 5, 1866, under the command of Captain Patton. She stopped in Montevideo and sailed from there on November 22, 1866, reaching San Francisco on February 8, 1867. She made one run to Portland for the Anchor Line. Her arrival on the West Coast and the greater competition the new ship heralded, triggered industry consolidation. The ocean-going fleet of the California Steam Navigation Company was merged into the California, Oregon, and Mexico Steamship Company in June 1867. The Anchor Line was absorbed as well, eliminating competition on the San Francisco - Portland route. Rates were immediately raised to $35 for a cabin and $20 for a steerage berth.

== California, Oregon, and Mexico Steamship Company (1867 - 1870) ==
Despite the change in ownership and rates, Idaho continued to sail between San Francisco and Portland in the immediate aftermath of the merger agreement. She was switched to the San Francisco - Honolulu route in mid-1867 and continued to sail to Hawaii until mid-1870. During this period, in March 1869, the California, Oregon and Mexico Steamship Company was reorganized as the North Pacific Transportation Company. The company changed from a New York corporation with headquarters in New York City to a California corporation with headquarters in San Francisco.

== Pacific Mail Steamship Company (1870 - 1875) ==
In October 1870 Idaho was chartered by the Pacific Mail Steamship Company to replace its ship Continental, which sank off Cabo San Lucas. She sailed from San Francisco to Mazatlan to replace Continental, and later to a number of other destinations including Panama, Portland and San Diego. There was over-capacity and vigorous competition on these routes, driving down profitability for all shipping companies. Idaho was idled in August 1874 to reduce costs. The steamship industry consolidated again in 1875 when five of the Pacific Mail Steamship Company ships were sold to Goodall, Nelson, and Perkins Steamship Company which focused solely on coastal trade in North America, leaving the longer international voyages to the Pacific Mail Steamship Company. It is unclear when Idaho became part of the Goodall, Nelson, and Perkins fleet, but one source relates that it was part of the larger 1875 deal. In any case, the next time California newspapers report her as assigned to a regular route was late 1877 under the flag of the Pacific Coast Steamship company.

== Pacific Coast Steamship Company (1875 - 1888) ==
When partner Chris Nelson retired in October 1876, Goodall, Nelson, and Perkins Steamship Company was reorganized as the Pacific Coast Steamship Company. The company spent $70,000 to renew Idaho and assigned the ship to her old San Francisco - Portland route in November 1877.

After a refit which refreshed her interior spaces in August 1880, she began sailing between San Francisco, and Victoria, B.C. with stops in Puget Sound at Port Townsend, Seattle, Tacoma, Steilacoom, and Olympia. She made the round-trip in 18 days or so depending on the weather. Part of the commercial attraction of the northern route was the general development of the economy of the Northwest, but the Cassiar gold rush in British Columbia also brought substantial new trade to the region. Her cargo from San Francisco headed north tended to be manufactured and processed items. For example, cargo bound for Victoria on Idaho's September 11, 1881 sailing included 8 cases of hats, 220 barrels of flour, 7 rolls of leather, 5537 pounds of tea, 5 cases of tobacco, 9 cases of fuse, 14,507 pounds of sugar, 55 barrels of whiskey, 80 coils of rope, and 540 pounds of opium. Cargo on the return voyage from the Northwest was primarily gold from the Canadian mines and raw agricultural commodities. For example, Idaho returned to San Francisco with $10,451 of Canadian gold on June 4, 1880. She sailed from Puget Sound with 4,000 sacks of oats on September 30, 1880.

Cruising to Alaska became popular among vacationers in the early 1880s, and gold mining began in earnest in Juneau in 1881. With these two new demands for shipping, the Pacific Coast Steamship Company assigned Idaho to the Alaskan trade. She sailed From Port Townsend for Harrisburg (now Juneau), Sitka, and Fort Wrangell for the first time on July 1, 1882. The ship made stops in Victoria and Nanaimo, British Columbia en route, the latter for coal. She sailed this route year-round except for trips back to San Francisco for maintenance for the next five years. The route was a success for Idaho. In fact, the Summer 1886 cruise season to Alaska was so popular that the ship was cited for carrying 215 passengers on one trip, 15 more than she was licensed for at the time. One of these was the Chief Justice of the United States Morrison Waite. Similarly, success of the Juneau gold mines continued the demand for transport of mining machinery and goods to Alaska. In February 1887 Idaho carried $60,000 in gold bullion south from the mines.

In late December 1885, Idaho arrived back in Port Townsend from Alaska. Between three and four-hundred pounds of undeclared opium was found aboard and the ship was seized by customs officials. Opium was not illegal at the time, but it was subject to high import duties. Idaho was seized for violations of these revenue laws. Her owners posted a $30,000 bond to free the ship pending a forfeiture hearing. Captain James Carroll, claimed to have no knowledge of the smuggling, but subsequent events throw this claim into question. After the seizure of Idaho, the U.S. Revenue Cutter Oliver Wolcott was dispatched to a cannary controlled by Carroll in Kasaan Bay, Alaska. Fourteen barrels, labeled as furs and landed from Idaho, were opened and found to contain 3,012 pounds of opium. The size of these seizures suggested to contemporary observers that this smuggling business had been underway for a long time. Nonetheless, Captain Carroll continued to sail for the Pacific Coast Steamship Company. The ship was condemned at its forfeiture hearing, but the decision was appealed so Idaho continued her normal runs to Alaska.

Issues with opium smuggling recurred during Idaho's service on the Alaska route. It was alleged at the time that the ship would pick up the drug, produced in the Far East, in Victoria. She would either transfer it to ships in Alaska sailing directly for San Francisco, or carry it back to a U.S. port itself, in either case avoiding high U.S. duties. On June 12, 1887, 45 pounds of undeclared opium were seized from Idaho in Portland. On August 1, 1887, 67 pounds of undeclared opium were seized from Idaho's dirty laundry at Portland. On November 1, 1887, 104 pounds of smuggled opium were seized from Idaho at Port Townsend, parts hidden in a lifeboat, the propeller shaft alley, and in the ship's butcher shop. On January 26, 1889 $1,000 of opium was found hidden inside the cabin walls of the ship. Idaho was not alone in this affliction as smugglers sought numerous routes to avoid U.S. customs duties.

Idaho had her share of accidents during her long career. On the evening of November 8, 1879 a southeast gale blew into San Francisco Bay. Despite having two anchors set, Idaho dragged across the bay grounding near Potrero Point. When the tide went out, her bow was five feet higher than her stern. Her damage was substantial. She was refloated, repaired, and cleared by marine surveyors to resume service in April, 1880. On November 24, 1888 Idaho was caught by a gale in Queen Charlotte Sound. She was driven aground and lost her main mast, most of her standing rigging, and part of her keel. She went into drydock in Victoria. Repairs which were completed on December 11, 1888, and she resumed her schedule to Alaska.

In late September 1886 Idaho was on the other side of a maritime accident. She was dispatched to search for the Ancon, another Pacific Coast Steamship Company vessel on the Alaska route, which was two-weeks overdue. On October 27, she found the Ancon, now under the command of James Carroll, which had been seriously damaged by grounding. She took off Ancon's passengers and returned them to Port Townsend while Captain Carroll salvaged Ancon.

== Oregon Railway and Navigation Company (1888 - 1889) ==
On April 20, 1888 Idaho was chartered to the Oregon Railway and Navigation Company. The railroad put her back on her original Portland - San Francisco route. The railroad used the steamer to complete trips to San Francisco for its rail passengers and cargo without having to pay for the use of competitors rails. The new venture was a success for the Oregon Railway and Navigation company, so it chartered a second ship, City of Topeka. The company expanded its through-rates to Puget Sound and British Columbia ports to compete with the Northern Pacific Railway without paying it for the use of its tracks.

=== Loss of Idaho ===
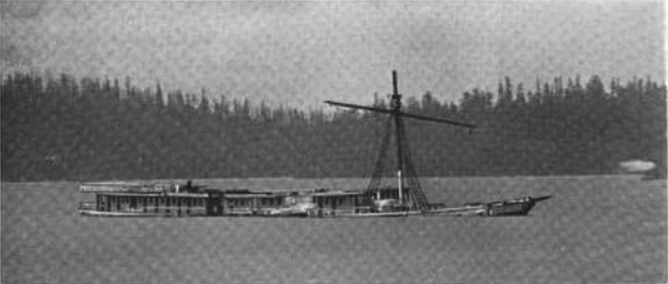
Wreck of the Idaho, probably from 1889 or 1890

Idaho sailed from Port Townsend bound for Portland at 3 AM on November 29, 1889. The fog in the Strait of Juan de Fuca was heavy, and Captain L. E. Angerstein steered toward the sound of the fog signal at the Race Rocks lighthouse. Sadly, at some point the fog signal stopped sounding. When it resumed, the ship was too close to avoid Rosedale Reef and she hit the rocks roughly amidships. The hull was pierced and the ship began to flood.

At the time of the grounding, her cargo was 150 barrels of fish oil, 370 barrels of salmon, 65 bales of hops, 200 tons of coal, and most problematically, 800 barrels of lime. The lime began to react with the seawater and burst into flame. The crew threw many of the barrels overboard and drilled holes in the hull to let in more water to drown the rest. The entire cargo deck was flooded to extinguish the fire.

While the fire was out, Idaho remained firmly grounded. The extensive flooding and exposed location of the ship suggested that she could not be saved. Formal salvage efforts began on December 1, 1889 and 892 separate items were removed including her anchors, chain, boats, windlass, a cannon, a piano, and various bits of furniture, crockery, and bedding. The wreck of the Idaho itself, was sold to the Pacific Coast Steamship Company for $500.

She was dislodged by a strong gale and floated free. Ironically, she may have gained enough buoyancy to escape the rocks because everyone assumed she could not. The tons of anchors, chain, and other materials that were taken off might have made the difference. She was spotted drifting in the Strait of Juan de Fuca on the morning of December 20, 1889. She was taken in tow by a succession of vessels and finally reached Port Townsend where she sank.
