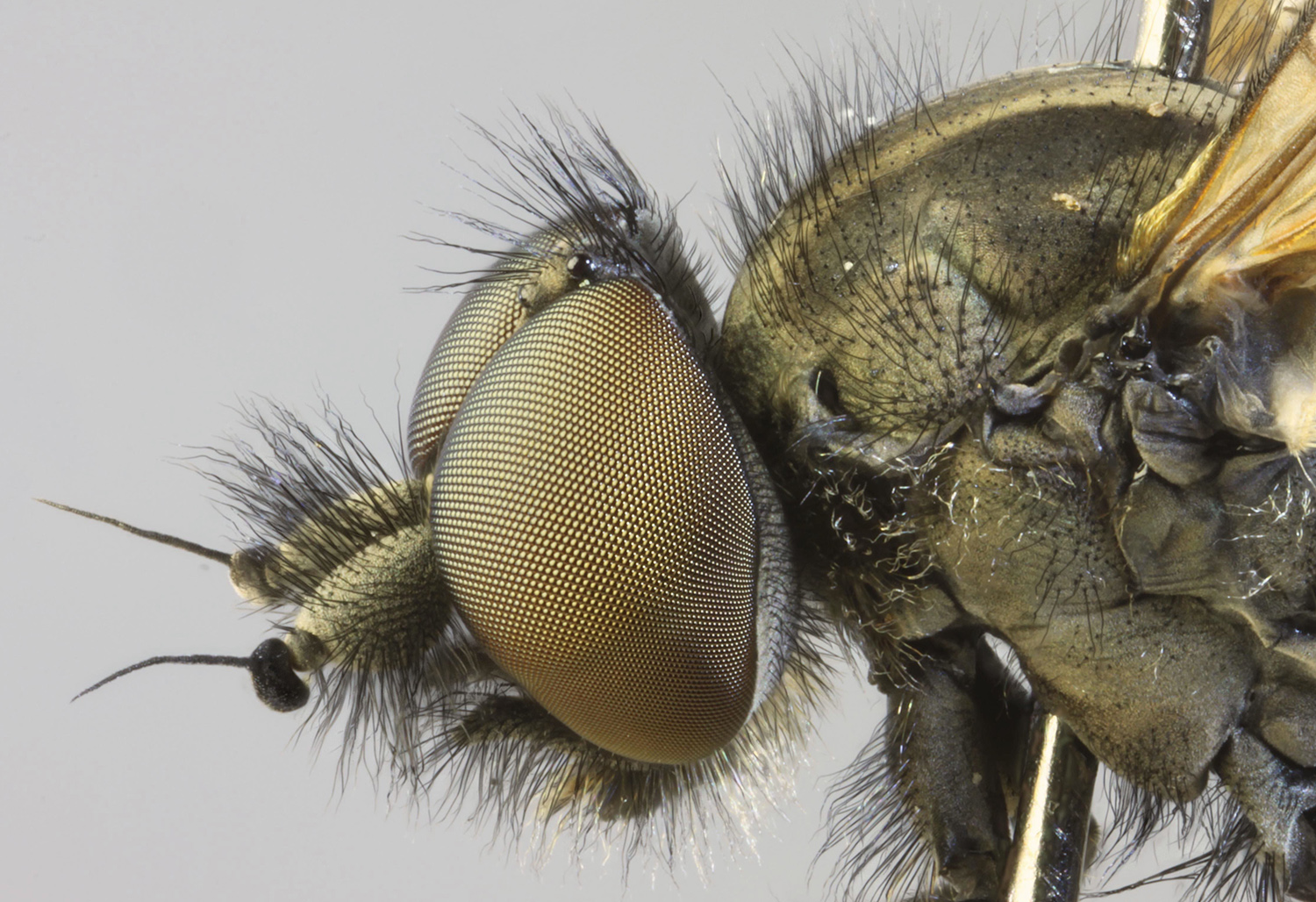
- Head of male Symphoromyia crassicornis

Scientific classification
- Kingdom: Animalia
- Phylum: Arthropoda
- Clade: Pancrustacea
- Class: Insecta
- Order: Diptera
- Family: Rhagionidae
- Subfamily: Spaniinae
- Genus: Symphoromyia; Frauenfeld, 1867

Type species
- Atherix melaena Meigen,1820

Subgenera
- Paraphoromyia Becker, 1921; Symphoromyia Frauenfeld, 1867; Axinicera Turner, 1974; Ochleromyia Turner, 1974; Pogonaria Turner, 1974

= Symphoromyia =

Genus of flies

Symphoromyia (meaning bane/blight fly in Greek) is a genus of snipe flies known to feed on blood of various mammals, including humans. They are stout flies ranging from 3 to 9 mm in length with bodies that are generally shiny to dull gray or black, though some species (especially within the subganus Axinicera) are predominantly yellowish-orange. The wings range from hyaline to heavily infuscate.

== Species ==
- Symphoromyia algens Leonard, 1931
- Symphoromyia atripes Bigot, 1887
- Symphoromyia barbata Aldrich, 1915
- Symphoromyia cervivora Turner & Chillcott, 1973
- Symphoromyia cinerea Johnson, 1903
- †Symphoromyia clerci Ngô-Muller & Nel, 2020
- Symphoromyia crassicornis (Panzer, 1808)
- Symphoromyia cruenta Coquillett, 1894
- Symphoromyia currani Leonard, 1931
- †Symphoromyia evecta (Meunier, 1910)
- †Symphoromyia examinata (Meunier, 1910)
- †Symphoromyia exigua (Meunier, 1910)
- Symphoromyia fulvipes Bigot, 1887
- Symphoromyia hirta Johnson, 1897
- Symphoromyia immaculata (Meigen, 1804)
- Symphoromyia inconspicua Turner & Chillcott, 1973
- Symphoromyia incorrupta Yang, Yang & Nagatomi, 1997
- Symphoromyia inquisitor Aldrich, 1915
- Symphoromyia johnsoni Coquillett, 1894
- Symphoromyia kincaidi Aldrich, 1915
- Symphoromyia limata Coquillett, 1894
- Symphoromyia liupanshana Yang, Dong & Zhang, 2016
- †Symphoromyia marginata Théobald, 1937
- Symphoromyia melaena (Meigen, 1820)
- Symphoromyia montana Aldrich, 1915
- Symphoromyia nana Turner & Chillcott, 1973
- Symphoromyia nigripilosa Yang, Dong & Zhang, 2016
- Symphoromyia pachyceras Williston, 1886
- Symphoromyia pallipilosa Yang, Dong & Zhang, 2016
- Symphoromyia pilosa Aldrich, 1915
- Symphoromyia plagens Williston, 1886
- Symphoromyia pleuralis Curran, 1930
- Symphoromyia plumbea Aldrich, 1915
- Symphoromyia pullata Coquillett, 1894
- Symphoromyia sackeni Aldrich, 1915
- Symphoromyia securifera Coquillett, 1904
- Symphoromyia sinensis Yang & Yang, 1997
- Symphoromyia spitzeri Chvála, 1983
- †Symphoromyia subtrita Cockerell, 1911
- †Symphoromyia succini Paramonov, 1938
- †Symphoromyia tertiarica Paramonov, 1938
- Symphoromyia trivittata Bigot, 1887
- Symphoromyia trucis Coquillett, 1894
- Symphoromyia truncata Turner, 1973
- Symphoromyia varicornis (Loew, 1872)
