= Ancon (1867 ship) =

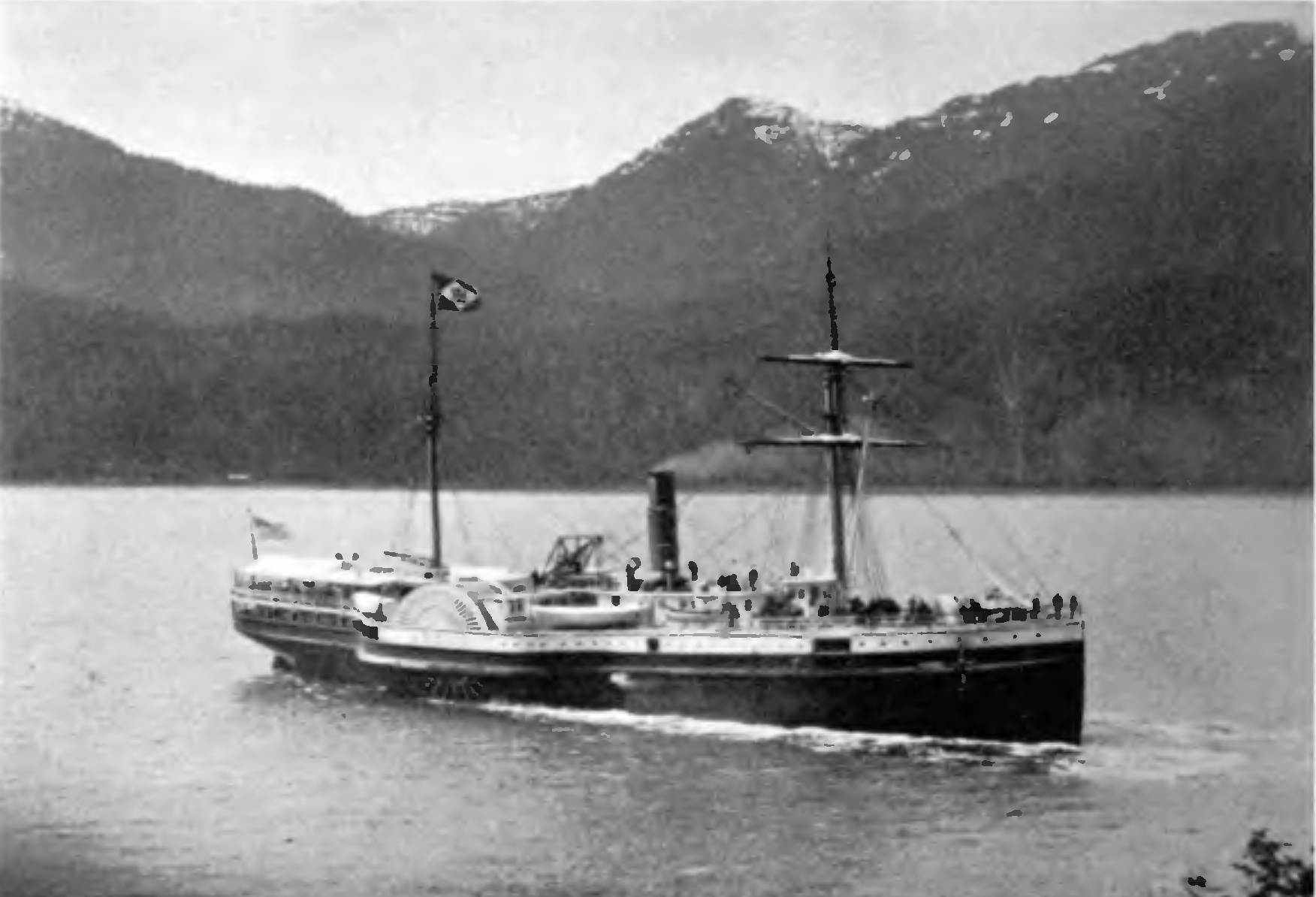
- Ancon

History
- Name: Ancon
- Owner: Pacific Mail Steamship Company (1867–1875) Pacific Coast Steamship Company (1875–1889)
- Launched: October 12, 1867
- Out of service: 1889
- Identification: J.S.T.F.
- Fate: Wrecked at Loring, Alaska August 28, 1889

General characteristics (as rebuilt in 1873)
- Type: Sidewheel steamship
- Tonnage: 1,541 GRT
- Length: 226 ft (69 m)
- Beam: 49 ft (15 m)
- Draft: 17.6 ft (5.4 m)
- Installed power: 400 hp (300 kW)
- Capacity: 135 first-class, 133 steerage passengers
- Crew: 50
- Notes: Official Number 1522

Ancon was an ocean-going wooden sidewheel steamship built in San Francisco in 1867. She carried both passengers and freight. In her early career she was a ferry in Panama and then ran between Panama and San Francisco. Later she began coastal runs between San Diego and San Francisco. Her last route was Port Townsend, Washington to Alaska. Today she is more notable for her disasters than her routine voyages. Ancon Rock in Icy Strait, Alaska is the site of her 1886 grounding. Her final wreck, in 1889 in Naha Bay, near Loring, Alaska was commemorated by Albert Bierstadt. His painting, "Wreck of the 'Ancon' in Loring Bay, Alaska" now hangs in the Museum of Fine Art in Boston.

== Construction and Panama service (1867–1872) ==
Ancon was originally built as a double-ended ferry for service in Panama for the Pacific Mail Steamship Company. She replaced the company's Taboga, which was retired. Ancon was built in the Hunter's Point neighborhood of San Francisco and launched on October 12, 1867. Her displacement was 654 tons. She was propelled by a coal-fired steam engine that generated 250 horsepower (190 kW). Sea trials with invited guests aboard were held on April 29, 1868. She was towed to Panama by the company's Golden City and arrived at Panama Bay on June 22, 1868. The Pacific Mail Steamship Company had a hub at the western end of the Panama Railroad. Its ocean-going steamships carried passengers and freight from California to Panama, where they could cross the isthmus by rail. From here steamships could take them to New York or other Atlantic ports. Ancon, which drew only 5 1/2 feet (1.7 m) of water at the time, was used as a lighter to bring people and goods ashore from the deep-draft ocean-going ships when they arrived at Panama.

== Rebuilding and Central American service (1872–1875) ==
Ancon proved too large for her role in Panama and was brought back to San Francisco in late 1872. She was rebuilt as an ocean-going ship. Her hull was reused, but she was given much greater capacity for passengers, cargo, and coal. Her displacement was almost tripled to 1,541 tons, and her engine was upgraded to 400 horsepower (300 kW). Her engine had a 50-inch (130 cm) cylinder with a 10-foot (3.0 m) stroke. Her boilers were coal-fired and she would take on as much as 400 tons of coal when refueling. Ancon's staterooms had two or three berths, and she could carry 135 cabin passengers and a similar number in steerage.

By mid-1873 Ancon was sailing from San Francisco to Panama and back with many stops in between. A single one-way trip took five weeks and involved 19 port calls. Her last trip in 1874 was notable for its light load. She left Panama with only 26 cabin and 15 steerage passengers, and only 32 sacks of mail. The opening of the transcontinental railroad link in the United States in 1869 much reduced demand for coast-to-coast steamship travel via Panama. Ancon ran only one more round trip to Panama, departing San Francisco on December 24, 1874 She returned March 11, 1875. On this final trip she carried 7,982 sacks of coffee beans to San Francisco.

In January 1875, the Goodall, Nelson, and Perkins Steamship Company acquired the competing San Francisco to San Diego routes, ships, and port facilities of the Pacific Mail Steamship Company, including Ancon. Goodall, Nelson, and Perkins was reorganized as the Pacific Coast Steamship Company in 1876.

== California Service (1875–1887) ==
From mid-1875 to 1887 Ancon sailed between San Francisco and San Diego, with several stops in between. She made three round trips per month. A one-way fare from San Pedro to San Francisco with a cabin was $15, and $10 for steerage. In late 1878 she was also periodically assigned to the San Francisco–Portland line with a single stop at Astoria. Starting in 1885, Ancon was periodically assigned to shuttle between San Francisco and Eureka.

Ancon's cargo was as diverse as the California economy. She shipped wool, wheat, honey, hides, household goods (including a piano), cranberries, cheese, lemons, oranges, shingles, doors, castings, guns, leather, whiskey, horses, fish, seal skins, marble, machinery, sweet potatoes, olives, chickens, and sacks of mail.

=== Grounding of Ventura ===
During the evening of April 20, 1875 the Pacific Mail Steamship Company vessel Ventura ran onto a rock off Point Sur in a dense fog. A large gash in the hull suggested that the ship would likely be totally destroyed, so the 225 passengers were landed on the beach. The steamer Santa Cruz took the passengers off the beach and delivered them to nearby Monterey. Ancon was sent from San Francisco to Monterey on April 22 to pick up the stranded passengers and take them on to San Pedro. The rescue effort was successful, and there were no deaths.

=== Collision with Phil Sheridan ===
During a voyage from Astoria to San Francisco, on the night of September 15, 1878 Ancon rammed the sailing vessel Phil Sheridan in the fog about 15 miles off the mouth of the Umpqua River. Phil Sheridan was a two-masted schooner of 158 tons displacement. The schooner rolled onto her beam ends and was assumed to be sinking. The passengers and crew were taken aboard Ancon. Ten days later Phil Sheridan was found still floating on her beam ends near Coos Bay and attempts were made to salvage her.

== Alaska service (1884–1889) ==
Cruising to Alaska became popular in the 1880s, so the Pacific Coast Steamship Company began to use the ship for "excursion" cruises in the summer. Ancon made three round trips to Alaska in 1884 under the command of Captain James Carroll.

In March 1887, the Pacific Coast Steamship Company reassigned Ancon permanently to the Alaska trade. For the remainder of her career, she would travel between Port Townsend, Victoria, Nanaimo, Juneau, Fort Wrangell, Sitka and a variety of smaller ports and settlements, some no more than a salmon cannery. She also made occasional trips to Portland, Tacoma, and Seattle during this period, often in conjunction with loading or discharging a particular cargo. She alternated trips to Alaska with the company's steamers Idaho and George W. Elder, completing a roundtrip from Port Townsend in about a month. Her trips were more frequent in summer due to tourist demand for cruises in the good weather. She sailed on the Inside Passage between Puget Sound and Alaska, not the open ocean.

She was considered a comfortable vessel, and carried such notables as Governor of the District of Alaska Alfred P. Swineford, U.S. Supreme Court Justice Stephen J. Field and Colorado Governor Alva Adams. Her steerage accommodations were less comfortable and were often used to transport miners and cannery workers to and from their seasonal work. On one voyage, Ancon sailed back from Sitka with 30 Chinese cannery laborers aboard. When she reached Port Townsend on October 15, 1888, the Collector of Customs refused to allow the Chinese off the ship. He asserted that because the ship sailed through British waters along the coast of British Columbia, the Chinese were arriving from a foreign country which was not allowed under the Chinese Exclusion Act. The matter was resolved in court when a judge ruled on October 23, 1888, that American-flagged ships were defined by law to be American territory. In sailing from Alaska to Washington on Ancon, they had, as a matter of law, always been in the United States and thus were not immigrants subject to the Chinese Exclusion Act. The Chinese were finally allowed off the ship.

Ancon's main cargo from Alaska was canned and salted salmon. She sometimes carried as much as 400 tons on a single voyage. Her cargoes for the northbound trip were more varied. They included supplies for the canneries, but also mining equipment for the Treadwell Mine and other mining operations in Southeast Alaska. One cargo was notable for cultural reasons. In 1887, she carried Rev. William Duncan, a sawmill, and 50 tons of supplies to Metlakata on Annette Island, helping establish the Tsimshian people in Alaska.

In addition to her legal freight, Ancon was thought by some to be engaged in smuggling. Under the laws of the District of Alaska, it was illegal to import alcohol. Nonetheless, according to one newspaper, after the ship arrived in Alaska, "for twenty-fours hours there was simply the deuce to pay with drunken fishermen and crazed people of both sexes." In 1887 U.S. Customs authorities confiscated $2,000 worth of gin, labeled as mineral water, from Ancon. The ship and her captain were also accused of smuggling opium from suppliers in Victoria, British Columbia to Alaska, where it was transferred to whaling ships that brought it back to West Coast ports in the United States.

=== Grounding in Icy Strait (1886) ===
At 9:57 P.M. on September 13, 1886, Ancon was cruising past Point Gustavus in Icy Strait, heading into Glacier Bay. Most of her 14 passengers were asleep in their staterooms. She approached to within a half-mile of the point and grounded hard on an uncharted rock. Her hull was pierced and she began flooding. The ship listed to one side while lifeboats were readied for launch. Three hours later, at 1 A.M. on September 14, the tide had risen sufficiently for Ancon to float free. The water in the hold had by then extinguished the boiler fires, however, so both the pumps and engines were disabled. The sails were raised and Captain Carroll maneuvered the ship toward Bartlett Cove as she settled lower in the water. He beached her on a sandy shore about 1.5 miles from the rock.

The rock splintered planking roughly 5 by 15 feet (1.5 m × 4.6 m) and made a hole large enough for a man to crawl through. The gash in her hull was below the waterline, about 40 feet (12 m) from the bow on her starboard side. Luckily for Ancon, the site of the damage was a hold filled with 150 tons of coal. Flooding would have been quicker in an open space.

Captain Carroll sent the ship's launch to Sitka on the morning of September 14 to seek help. The crew, when not otherwise engaged in repairs, assembled the staves and hoops of the 1,000 empty barrels in its cargo destined for the herring plant at Killisnoo (near modern Angoon) and put them in the hold for extra buoyancy. USS Pinta arrived on September 19 from Sitka, bringing carpenters and planking to make repairs. Additional materials were required, so Pinta made a quick trip to Juneau and returned on September 26. The next day, Idaho arrived on the scene. She had been dispatched from Port Townsend to look for the overdue Ancon. The passengers were transferred to Idaho, which then fetched another 2,500 empty barrels from Killisnoo. A cofferdam was built around the damaged area of Ancon's hull and temporary repairs were made. Pinta took off as much coal as she could, lightening Ancon, and then pulled her off the beach at high tide on October 2, 1886. Ancon paddled into Bartlett Cove and was beached again for additional repairs. Finally, she sailed to Juneau under her own power in company of Idaho and Pinta. The crew thought it likely that the 3,500 empty barrels in her hold would keep her afloat if the hull patch failed, but this theory was not tested; the ship made an uneventful passage to Juneau. Captain Carroll beached the ship again near a sawmill on Douglas Island to make sturdier repairs. On October 15, 1886, she sailed out of Juneau for Killisnoo, where she returned the empty barrels, and then south for permanent repairs.

While the initial repairs were made on the beach, the passengers played cards, and the local Tlingit natives stopped by to see the unusual sight. There was no radio in 1886 and no other ship carried news of the wreck south. As Ancon became two weeks overdue, speculation began that she had been lost. Word of her fate finally reached the wider world by telegraph on October 8, 1886, when Idaho reached Victoria, British Columbia with Ancon's passengers.

Officers from the United States Coast and Geodetic Survey were immediately sent to chart the rock, which they named, "Ancon Rock" in November 1886. By this time Ancon had sailed to San Francisco where she was hauled out of the water at the Merchant's Dry Dock Company for permanent repairs. By mid-December, she was back at sea on the San Francisco – San Pedro route.

A buoy at the site of the grounding now warns other ships of the submerged Ancon Rock.

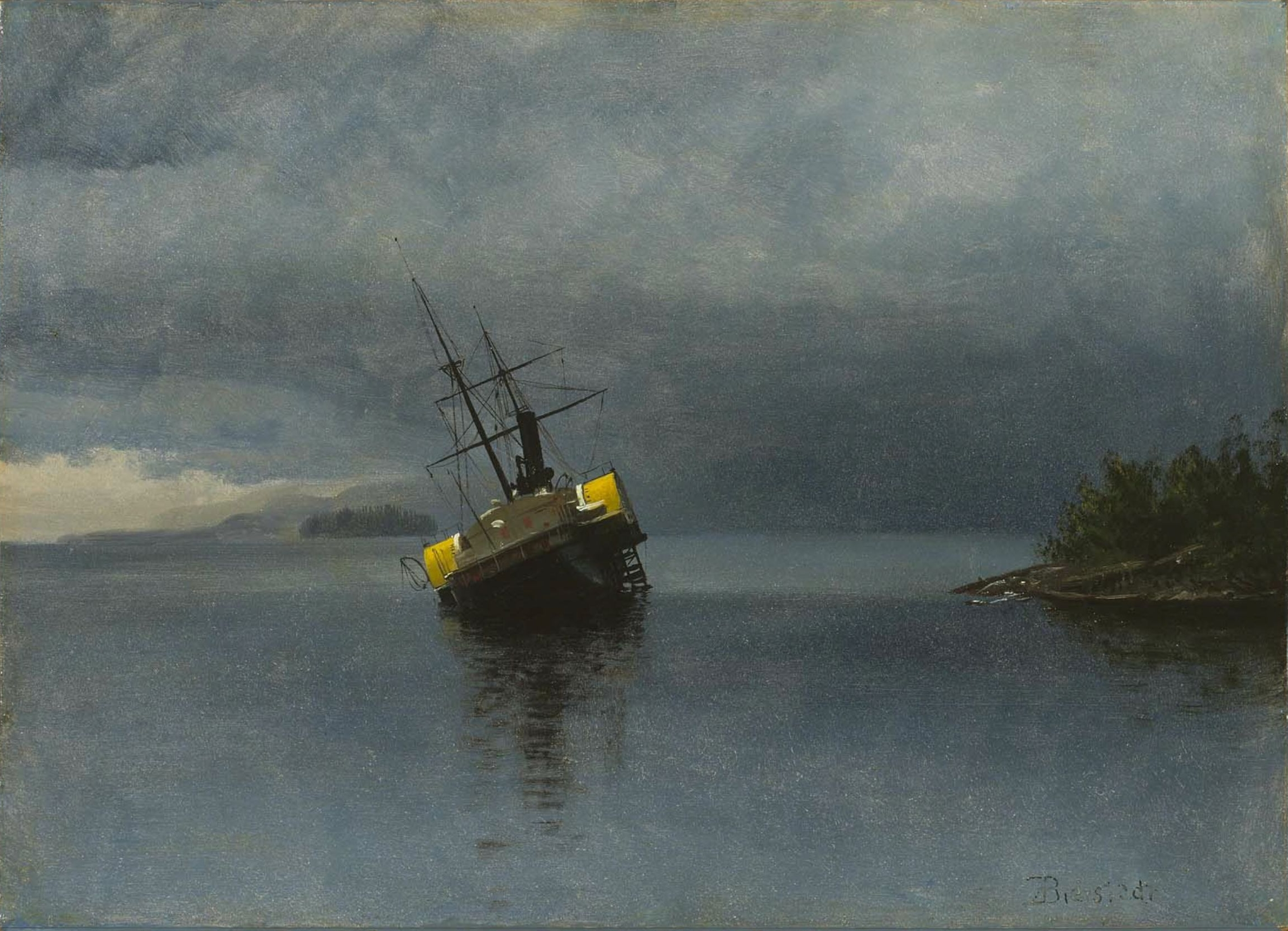
Albert Bierstadt's, "Wreck of the Ancon"

=== Wreck of Ancon (1889) ===
On August 12, 1889, Ancon sailed from Port Townsend on her regular Alaska run. She had aboard about 100 first-class passengers, 30 steerage passengers, and 70 crew under the command of Captain David Wallace. She stopped at Victoria, and then sailed directly to Tongass Narrows, roughly the site of modern Ketchikan. She made her usual stops at Loring, Wrangell, Juneau, Killisnoo, Sitka, and then anchored at the head of the Muir Glacier in Glacier Bay for the benefit of the tourists aboard. She stopped at Bartlett Cove briefly on her way out of Glacier Bay, and then sailed up Lynn Canal, stopping near modern Haines and Skagway. Ancon headed south from here, stopping again at Juneau, and Wrangell, before arriving back at the dock in Loring on August 27, 1889.

Loring boasted a wharf at the salmon saltery, and Ancon tied up overnight to take aboard cases of processed salmon. She got underway again at 3 A.M. on August 28, 1889, and immediately ran onto a reef, well inside the harbor and only a few hundred feet from shore. Passenger reports suggest that the cause of the wreck was a line handling error as the ship left the wharf. The tide was ebbing, creating a current out of the harbor. The bow line was let go and the current began to swing the ship around, pivoting on the stern line, to face out of the harbor. The stern line was let go too early, however, and instead of turning so that the bow faced out, the ship drifted sideways up the bay. She grounded amidships, and stuck there as the tide fell. Ancon listed to port and the strain caused cabin doors to jam. Some passengers had to escape out their windows. As the receding water left her higher and higher on the rocks, the weight of the ship and her cargo broke her in two. Water flooded into the hold.

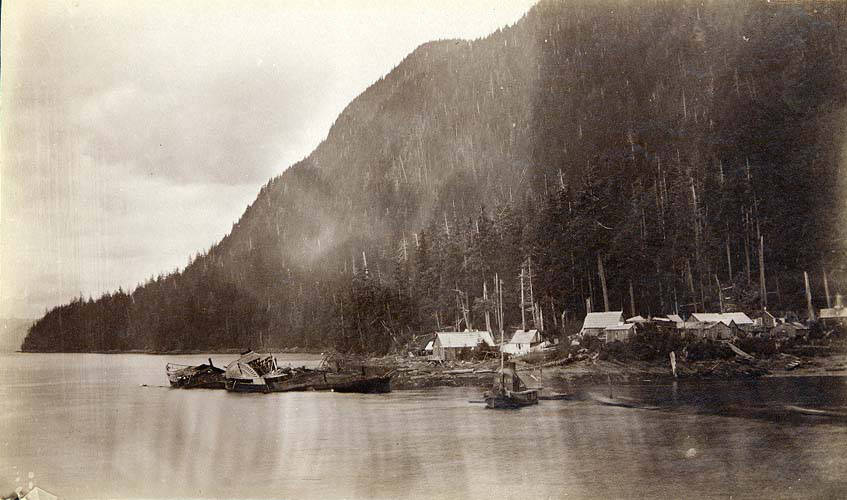
Remains of Ancon, ca. 1895

The ship was so close to shore that it was a simple matter to transfer the passengers and their baggage in small boats. The crew also brought ashore food, bedding, and other supplies since they predicted correctly that some time would elapse before any help could be expected. The Alaska Packing Company, which owned the fish processing plant organized shelter among the company buildings, private homes, and even among the local Tlingit houses. Painter Albert Bierstadt took advantage of his time ashore. He wrote to his wife that he had a "narrow escape" from the shipwreck. Narrow or not, he escaped with his art supplies and completed 60 color studies and two books of drawings, including "Wreck of the Ancon".

On September 1, 1889, George W. Elder reached Loring on her regular Alaska run. At this late date in the season there were few passengers aboard, so she could embark all of Ancon's passengers and crew. There was brief consideration of George W. Elder continuing its Alaska itinerary, but consensus was reached to return south immediately, at least in part because no one knew of Ancon's wreck and she would be weeks overdue by the time George W. Elder returned on her normal schedule. The passengers and crew arrived in Port Townsend on George W. Elder on September 5, 1889. Two-thirds of Ancon's cargo of 13,835 cases of canned salmon, 182 barrels of salted salmon, gold bullion from the Juneau mines, and other merchandise was salvaged. Ancon herself never left. Her chains, anchors, and boats were salvaged, but the Pacific Coast Steamship company judged her wood construction and sidewheel technology obsolete and not worth repair, particularly since she was not insured. Indeed, she was one of the last sidewheel steamers on the coast, and some argued that the speed with which she broke apart on the reef was a sign that old age had rotted her timbers. The hulk was burned so as not to be a hazard to navigation. What parts were not salvaged or burned rotted and rusted away. The only remains are the thickest parts of the boilers which can be seen at low tide on the rock where they came to rest. Captain Wallace appears not have been blamed for the wreck since he was assigned to command City of Topeka which took Ancon's place in the Pacific Coast Steamship Company's Alaska service.

== Captains ==
Historical documents provide a partial list of Ancon's captains:

Captain E. Howes: 1873

Captain Thomas Stothard: 1875

Captain Gerard Debney: 1875, 1876, 1877, 1878, 1879

Captain Alexander: 1879, 1880

Captain Plummer: 1879

Captain J. W. Ingalls: 1880, 1881, 1882, 1883, 1885, 1887

Captain Goodall: 1884

Captain Leland: 1885

Captain James Carroll: 1884, 1885, 1886, 1887, 1888

Captain Ackerly: 1887

Captain J. C. Hunter: 1887

Captain David Wallace: 1884, 1885, 1887, 1889

== External sources ==
The Alaska Digital archives has photos of the ship underway, at a wharf at Sitka, at a cannery and at a glacier.

A photograph of the ship fully out of the water and aground in Loring is here.
