= Floridian =

Floridian may refer to:

- The demonym for a person from the American state of Florida
  - List of people from Florida
- Floridian (train, 1971–1979), a train operated by Amtrak from 1971 to 1979
- Floridian (train), a train that Amtrak launched in 2024
- Miami Floridians, a professional basketball franchise in the original, now-defunct American Basketball Association
- USS Floridian (ID-3875), a United States Navy troop transport in commission in 1919

== See also ==
- The Floridian (disambiguation)
- Floridiana, a term referring to artifacts relating to the state of Florida
