= Senator (1848 ship) =

Side-wheel steamship

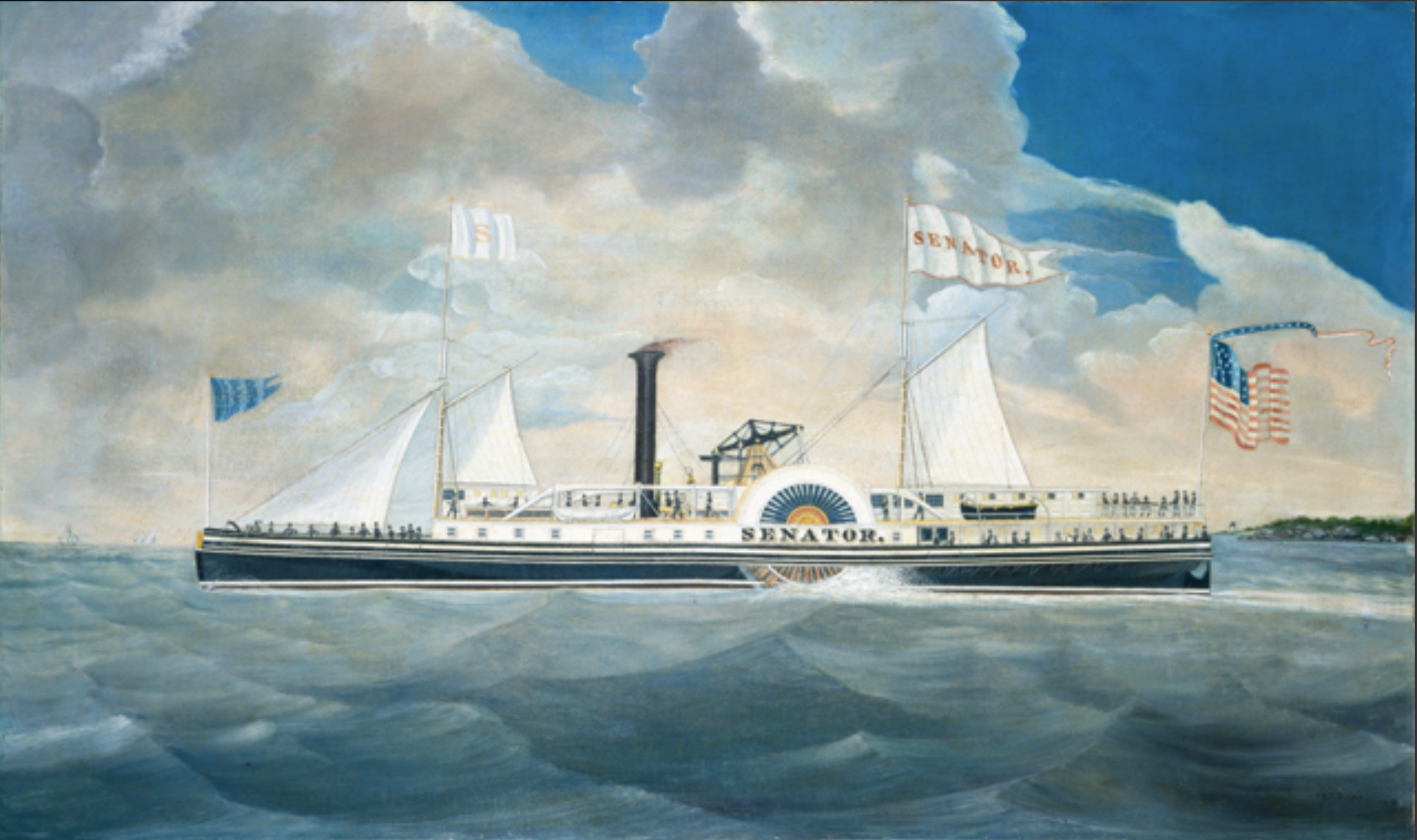
- Senator, likely soon after launch in 1848

History

United States
- Name: Senator
- Builder: William H. Brown Shipyard (New York, NY)
- Cost: $90,000
- Launched: 1848
- Identification: Signal letters H.W.S.N.
- Fate: Broken up in New Zealand ca. 1912

General characteristics
- Tonnage: 1012
- Tons burthen: 745
- Length: 219 ft (67 m)
- Beam: 35 ft 5 in (10.80 m)
- Draft: 10 ft (3.0 m)
- Depth of hold: 12 ft 2 in (3.71 m)
- Decks: 1
- Installed power: 450 HP steam engine
- Propulsion: Side paddlewheels
- Sail plan: Schooner
- Speed: 16 knots
- Capacity: 140 cabin passengers, 50 steerage 300 tons of freight
- Notes: Official Number 23219

Senator was a wooden, side-wheel steamship built in New York in 1848. She was one of the first steamships on the California coast and arguably one of the most commercially successful, arriving in San Francisco at the height of the California gold rush. She was the first ocean-going steamer to sail up the Sacramento River to reach the new gold fields. After more purpose-built river steamers became available, Senator began a 26-year long career sailing between San Francisco and Southern California ports. Age and improving technology finally made the ship unsuitable for passenger service by 1882. Her machinery was removed and she was converted into a coal hulk. She ended her days in New Zealand, where she was broken up sometime around 1912.

== Construction ==
Senator was built in 1848 at the shipyard of William H. Brown at the foot of 12th Street on the East River in lower Manhattan. She had a wooden hull built primarily of white oak. She was 219 feet (67 m) long, 35 feet 5 inches (10.80 m) in beam, and 10 feet (3.0 m) in draft. She displaced 1,012 tons.

The ship was rigged as a two-masted schooner and could sail, but her primary propulsion was provided by side-mounted paddle wheels, 30 feet (9.1 m) in diameter. These were driven by a coal-fired, single-beam steam engine that produced 450 horsepower. The single cylinder had a bore of 50 inches (1.3 m) with a stroke of 11 feet (3.4 m). The engine was built in New York City at the Archimedes Iron Works of H. R. Dunham.

She was built for steamboat entrepreneur James C. Cunningham, who also owned the steamers Admiral and Governor. Her original cost was reported to be almost $90,000.

Senator had staterooms on deck for her first class passengers, a salon where they could take their meals, and a separate "ladies cabin" where the women could retreat from the smoking and drinking men. Her tableware was custom-made solid silver and her bedding had "Senator" woven into its fabric. She had a separate cabin forward for steerage passengers which had kitchen facilities for these passengers to cook their own meals.

Senator underwent a major refit in 1869. Her deck was raised by 32 inches (0.81 m) which increased the depth of her cargo hold. Her passenger accommodations were completely rebuilt. She had 42 staterooms, of which four were bridal suites, giving her capacity for 93 cabin passengers. The outside staterooms were paneled in rosewood. The floor of the salon was made of alternate panels of walnut and ash.

Another major refit took place in 1875. In addition to significant strengthening of her aging hull, her accommodations were increased to 140 cabin passengers and 50 steerage passengers.

== Atlantic coast service (1848 - 1849) ==
Senator began her commercial service in June 1848 with less than a month of service sailing between Portland and Bangor, Maine. After this brief shakedown period, she began running between Boston, Saint John, New Brunswick, and Halifax, Nova Scotia in conjunction with Cunningham's steamer Admiral. This routing was short-lived. By the start of 1849, Senator sailed for the Boston and Fall River Line. She sailed from The Battery in lower Manhattan on Tuesdays, Thursdays, and Saturdays at 4 PM. She stopped at Newport, Rhode Island and then went on to Fall River, Massachusetts. Her arrival was coordinated with the Fall River and Old Colony Railroad, which would take travelers on to Boston. Alternately, passengers could sleep aboard Senator and catch a train the next morning arriving in Boston at 8:30 am.

== Repositioning to the Pacific (1849) ==
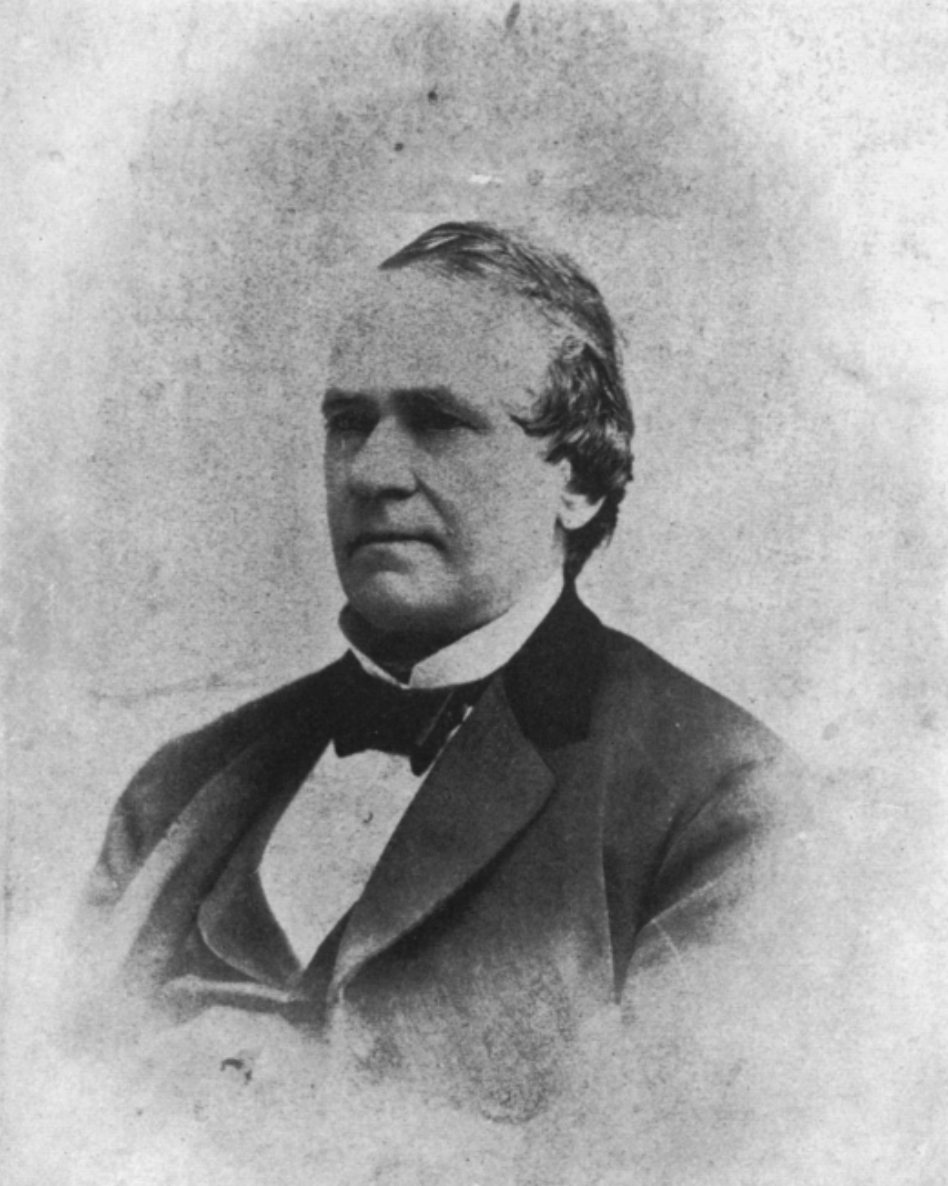
Lafayette Mayard, who first thought to bring Senator to California, shown in 1876

The United States Exploring Expedition surveyed the Sacramento River and its tributaries in 1841. At the start of the California gold rush, in 1848, U.S. Navy Lieutenant Lafayette Maynard studied this survey and became convinced that the river could be navigated by an ocean-going steamer, a superior vessel to the small craft in use at the time. He organized an investment syndicate to fund the purchase of such a vessel. Edward Minturn, a wealthy ship owner in New York, agreed to invest so long as his brother, Charles Minturn, was the business agent for the company once the ship reached San Francisco. The Minturn's invested cash for a 25% share of the company. Maynard received a 25% share and in return gave James Cunningham a mortgage on the ship and bought an insurance policy with Cunningham as the beneficiary in case the ship was lost. Cunningham owned 50% of the new company. The new venture bought Senator from Cunningham, in January 1849 for $80,000.

Senator sailed from New York for San Francisco as soon as she could be readied for the trip. Lt. Maynard, on furlough from the Navy, and Charles Minturn would sail as owners' representatives, but the ship would be under the command of another serving naval officer, Lieutenant Richard Bache. Bache was granted leave from his duties so that he might take the opportunity to learn about running a steam powered vessel, still a novelty at the time. While there was no freight carried on the trip so as to allow for more coal, Charles Minturn did advertise for passengers, offering the New York to San Francisco passage with a stateroom for $600, or $300 for steerage. It appears that few, if any, passengers were actually carried.

Senator left New York harbor on March 11, 1849. She stopped in Havana for coal on March 31. She stopped in Belem, Brazil for coal. She stopped at Rio de Janeiro for fuel, sailing on again on April 29. On the next day she encountered a storm which caused significant damage, and was forced to put in at St. Catherines Island for repairs. She had a number of broken starboard hull frames replaced there. She sailed from St Catherines on May 23 and arrived at Port Famine in the Strait of Magellan on June 13.

The ship had been driven to port on several occasions because she ran low on coal. Now at the tip of South America, there was none to be had. The crew took the ship's axes ashore and began cutting wood to fire the boiler. This was slow going. There was snow on the ground in the austral winter, and it took five days to chop enough wood to sail for one day. Senator crawled north up the coast of Chile. She ran so late there was concern that she had sunk somewhere along the way. Senator finally arrived in Port San Carlos, (now Ancud, Chile) on August 8, 1849. Here she was able to renew her coal supply. She left on August 14 and arrived in Valparaiso, Chile on August 17. She left on August 24 and arrived at Callao, Peru on August 31, 1849. She sailed again on September 4 and reached Panama on September 14. There were many gold rushers waiting there that had come to Panama from the Atlantic coast and crossed the isthmus over land. Senator picked up 200 passengers and sailed on October 6. The ship finally reached her new home port of San Francisco on October 27, 1849, almost eight months en route.

== People's Line (1849 - 1854) ==
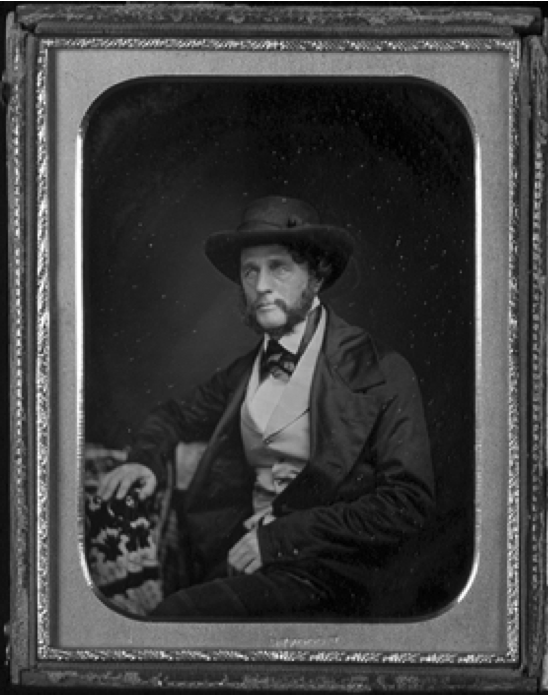
Charles Minturn, Senator's business agent and one of her owners, shown in 1851

On Monday November 5, 1849 Senator steamed from San Francisco to Sacramento, the gateway to the gold fields, for the first time. She was the first ocean-going steamer to make this trip. She departed at 8 am and reached Sacramento at 6 pm, at the time seen as a feat of great speed. After this initial success, Charles Minturn established a two round-trip per week schedule, sailing to Sacramento on Tuesdays and Saturdays, and back to San Francisco on Thursdays and Sundays. By March 1850, Senator's sailings were increased to three round trips per week. The fare to Sacramento was $25 one-way. The ship also stopped at Benicia, for which the fare was $15. Freight was carried to Sacramento at a rate of $2 per hundred pounds for "heavy goods", and $0.75 per foot for "measurement goods". Minturn exploited Senator's popularity by arranging connections to shallow-water steamers that would take her passengers from Sacramento up the Feather and Yuba Rivers to the heart of the gold diggings. With minimal competition on the river and the gold rush still booming, Senator usually had 300 passengers and 200 to 300 tons of freight aboard for each trip, netting her $60,000 per month in her first year in San Francisco. Competition stiffened as more ships reached the Bay Area, but even so Senator earned her investors more than $1,500,000 in her first five years in California.

With few accurate charts, buoys, lights, or other navigational aids, no navigation instruments beyond a lead line, and the fogs for which the Bay Area is known, accidents were common. Senator found herself involved with all aspects of this marine reality. In November 1849, she assisted the grounded and flooding Kronprinzesson by towing her to Yerba Bueana Island before she sank. On September 7, 1850, Senator collided with the brig Caleb Curtis, which was anchored. The night was foggy and the brig had neither any lights on or a person on deck keeping watch. On the night of December 29, 1850 Senator rammed the ship Rhode Island, and opened her hull to the sea. She was prevented from sinking by the cargo of lumber aboard. Senator and Confidence collided on the Sacramento River on April 10, 1851, perhaps in an attempt to beat a competitor to San Francisco. Senator collided with Miner in June 1851. While in drydock in 1851, a tree trunk nine inches in diameter was found driven into Senator's hull. The snag acted as a plug, so little harm was done, but this incident underscores that the Sacramento River had its share of navigational hazards, too.

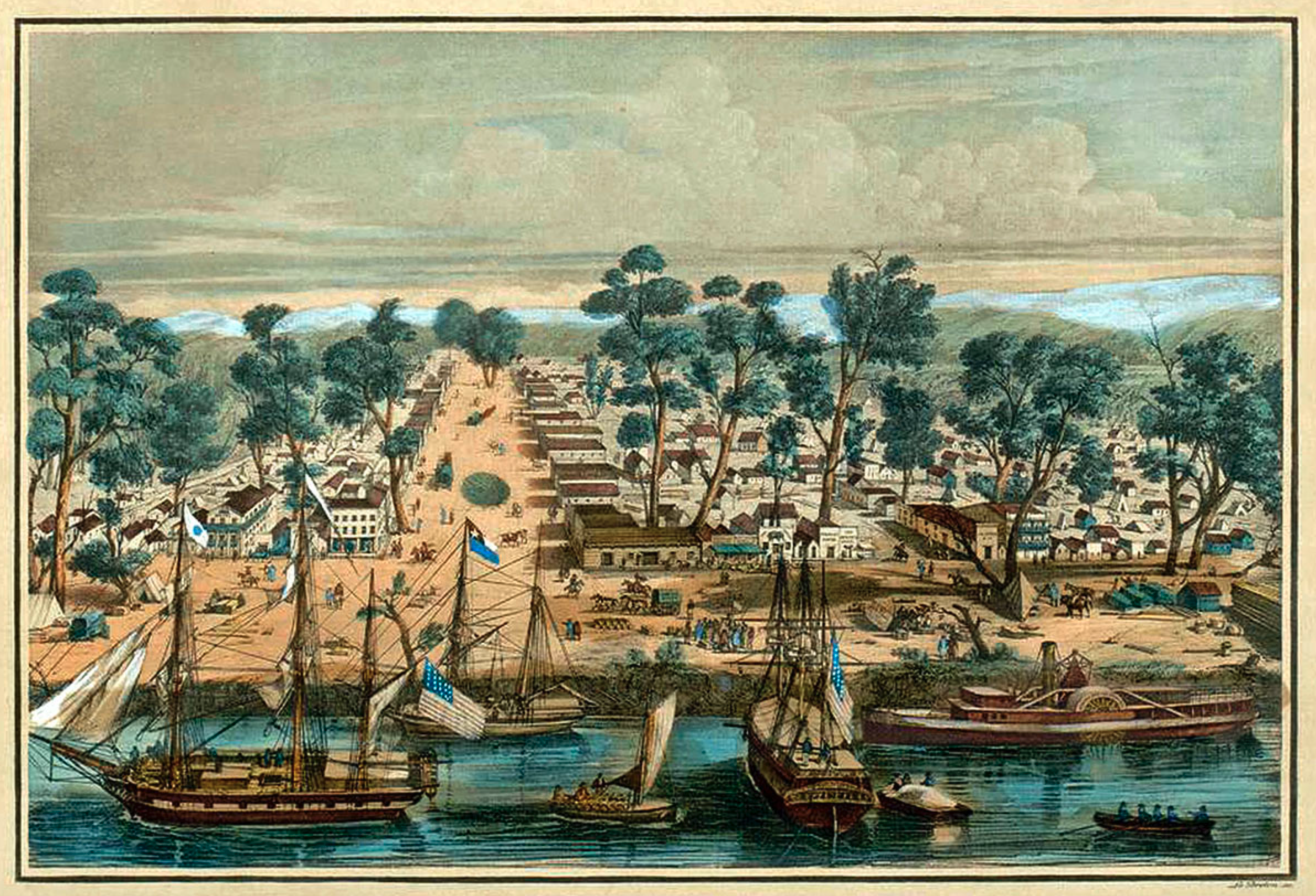
Sacramento River waterfront in 1849, looking up J Street. Senator is likely the steamer on the lower right.

Drama on the competitive scene was also the order of the day. While Senator was successful as an individual ship, Charles Minturn was building a larger company. In 1850, New World, another New York-built ship, arrived in San Francisco. The owners of the two ships combined their interests under the People's Line brand in 1851, with Minturn as business agent for both ships. The two vessels offered sailings in both directions on the Sacramento River six days a week, with Senator leaving San Francisco on Tuesdays, Thursdays, and Saturdays and New World leaving Mondays, Wednesdays, and Fridays. Attracted by gold rush riches, many new ships reached the Bay Area by late 1851. Prices for steam travel crashed as the newcomers attempted to steal customers from the existing businesses. In October 1851, Senator charged only $5 for a trip from San Francisco to Sacramento and $5 per ton for freight. Profitability went out of the industry, so the owners of ten Bay Area steamers, including Charles Minturn representing Senator, agreed to a uniform set of rates in January, 1852. A cabin passage from San Francisco to Sacramento would henceforth be $10 and freight would ship for $10 a ton.

The wear and tear of continuous use required a major refit in January 1852. Worms had eaten the wood of Senator's hull and her machinery needed replacing. Two new boilers and two new chimneys were shipped from New York. They weighed 49 tons, and created such stability problems for the clipper ship carrying them, Hornet, that its captain was forced to throw them overboard to prevent capsizing. With her new boilers at the bottom of the sea, Minturn was forced to idle Senator in February 1852. A second set of boilers was ordered, and Senator went into the shipyard to receive her new equipment in December, 1852. She completed her sea trials with her new machinery on February 3, 1853, attaining a speed of 16 knots. The ship was immediately placed back on her old run between San Francisco and Sacramento.

The new boilers did not fix the competitive situation, however, and while Senator sat idle, yet more ships joined the competition on the Sacramento River. When she resumed service in February 1852, Senator's fare from San Francisco to Sacramento was $1 for a cabin and $0.50 for deck passage. Even the newspapers of the time recognized that such fares were "death to the owners". By 1853, there were 25 steamers competing for Sacramento River trade and no one was making money. The steamboat owners went beyond agreeing to fix prices as they had done in 1852. They formed a single new company, the California Steam Navigation Company, which would own and manage all of the ships on the inland waters of California. Charles Minturn was one of the original incorporators. The People's Line, including Senator was folded into the new company which was incorporated on February 22, 1854.

== California Steam Navigation Company (1854 - 1867) ==
The California Steam Navigation Company idled most of its fleet immediately upon its organization to eliminate excess capacity, and raised prices to return profitability. Senator was one of the ships that was chosen to continue her service between San Francisco and Sacramento in 1854. Her paddlewheels were damaged in 1855, and she sat idle until May 1856 when she returned to her route on the Sacramento River.

Struggling to find profitable uses for all the ships that were consolidated into the California Steam Navigation Company, Senator's owners expanded to coastal routes. In June 1856, the ship began running from San Francisco to San Diego. She stopped at San Pedro, from whence her passengers were taken to Los Angeles by stagecoach, and Santa Barbara. She made two round trips per month. In December 1857, she took time off from her southern routing for a visit to dry dock at Mare Island. She received a new keel, new planking, and new copper sheeting on her bottom to protect her hull from marine worms.

There was a lively passenger trade between San Francisco and Southern California. Among the larger groups of passengers were several companies, about 300 men, of the US Army's 6th Infantry Regiment, which Senator transported from San Francisco to San Pedro in December 1858 and January 1859. These troops were sent south in response to developments in the Mojave War. Senator brought the returns from the 1860 presidential election from San Diego county to San Francisco. John Breckenridge, who was the preferred candidate of the U.S. south, beat Abraham Lincoln 148 to 81 in the county. In response to pro-southern political sympathies, Senator played troopship again, moving Companies E and I of the 4th Infantry Regiment from San Francisco to San Pedro to safeguard Union control of Southern California. Her work moving the men, horses, and mules of the US Army up and down the California coast continued throughout the Civil War.

On the freight side of Senator's business, Southern California shipped large quantities of food and agricultural products to San Francisco. These included seven thousand pounds of pears, 50,000 pounds of corn, 1,000 sacks of flour, 1,000 pounds of walnuts, 300 live quail, 5,000 boxes of grapes, green turtles, sea otter pelts, 235 bales of wool, and flocks of sheep. In September 1859, freight was carried for $5 per ton.

The vagaries of navigation in these early years were as evident on the coastal route as they had been when Senator was running the Sacramento River. The ship was crossing the bar heading into San Francisco on January 1, 1863, when she was hit by a large wave which damaged her aft cabins. On March 8, 1863, she fired a signal gun on her arrival in San Francisco. The wadding hit a house on Telegraph Hill, went through the siding, and just missed three people. On March 14, 1863, the ship hit a rock off San Pedro in dense fog. Her passengers and freight were safely removed and Captain Seeley ran the ship to the beach to prevent her from sinking in deep water. The California Steam Navigation Company dispatched Pacific with steam-driven pumps and the Senator was saved. A particular hazard of the steamboat era was boiler explosions, which Senator had so far avoided.

In 1863, the port of San Pedro was too shallow for a steamer of Senator's draft to discharge directly at a pier. Instead, she would anchor in deeper water about five miles out. Passengers and freight would be shuttled, lightered, between ship and shore. The Ada Hancock, a shallow-draft, propeller-driven steamer was serving as a lighter for Senator on April 27, 1863. Passenger baggage and freight had been transferred to Senator by the Ada Hancok. On her next trip, she was taking passengers from the shore to Senator. At about 5 pm, when she was about a half-mile from her wharf, her boiler exploded catastrophically and the ship sank. Fragments of Ada Hancock landed three-quarters of a mile away. At least 26 people were killed and more were injured, most of them passengers on their way to Senator. Among the dead was Senator's long-time captain, Thomas W. Seeley. First Officer John S. Butters took command of the ship as her new captain.

In August 1865 Senator became the first ship to carry crude oil from Southern California. She carried six barrels containing 300 gallons from San Pedro to San Francisco.

Senator drops out of the news in December 1865. The California Steam Navigation Company replaced her on the south coast route with the larger and newer Orizaba and Pacific, keeping Captain Butters on the route in Orizaba. It is likely that Senator rode out most of 1866 at anchor in San Francisco Bay waiting for her next assignment. This came in April 1867, when Senator was placed on the south coast route again, running from San Francisco to the smaller, nearer ports of Santa Cruz and San Luis Obispo.

While Senator was profitably employed in Southern California, the California Steam Navigation Company developed a profitable north coast route, between San Francisco and Portland. These northern routes overlapped with the California, Oregon, and Mexico Steamship Company run by Ben Holladay. The two companies developed a stable duopoly, with a cabin fare of $45 and a steerage rate of $25. When a third steamship company, the Anchor Line, entered the Portland - San Francisco market in 1865, fares fell to $10 and $5. Just as occurred on the Sacramento River in 1854, the over-capacity that created unprofitable competition triggered industry consolidation. The entire ocean-going fleet of the California Steam Navigation Company, including Senator, and the Anchor Line were merged into the California, Oregon, and Mexico Steamship Company in 1867.

== North Pacific Transportation Company (1867 - 1872) ==
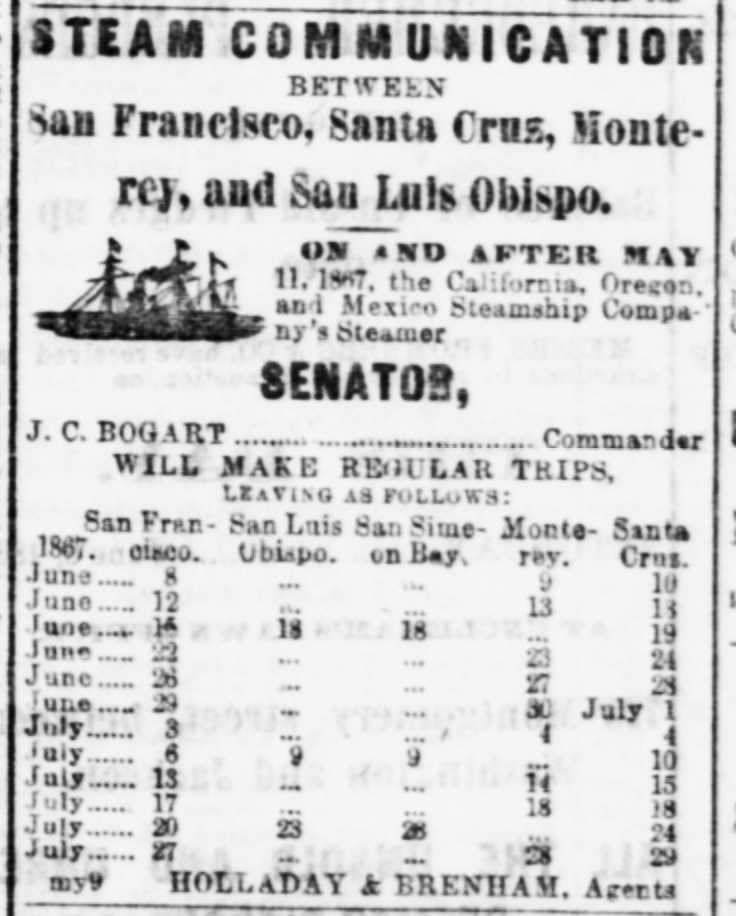
June 1867 Advertisement for Senator's south coast run

Immediately after the merger, in May 1867, Senator's new owners kept her running to the smaller ports south of San Francisco, Santa Cruz, Monterrey, and San Luis Obispo. Evidently, her new owners thought she was of continuing usefulness, because they invested in a major renovation in early 1869. Senator had substantial routine maintenance performed, including replacing hull planking, decks, paddle wheels, and the copper sheeting protecting her bottom, as well as having her hull and deck framing strengthened. Significantly, her deck was raised, increasing the capacity of her cargo hold. When Senator emerged from the shipyard after her refit in June 1869, she returned to her south coast route but was periodically sent to the larger ports of San Pedro and San Diego, as well. On several occasions during this period she completed her route with freight only, as a safety precaution. On these sailings she carried combustibles, notably gunpowder, nitroglycerin, and kerosene.

In March 1869, the California, Oregon, and Mexico Steamship Company was reorganized as the North Pacific Transportation Company. The company changed from a New York corporation with headquarters in New York City to a California corporation with headquarters in San Francisco. Ben Holladay became financially overextended and ultimately lost most of his fortune in the Panic of 1873. In September 1872, he sold the North Pacific Transportation Company and all of its ships, including Senator, to one of his competitors, the Pacific Mail Steamship Company.

== Pacific Mail Steamship Company (1872 - 1875) ==

The Pacific Mail Steamship Company paid $75,000 to purchase Senator. While she changed her house flag, the ship continued on her south coast runs as before.

The Pacific Mail Steamship company had two lines of business. One was long, trans-Pacific routes. The other was routes along the west coast of North America. In this second sphere there was vigorous competition with Goodall, Nelson, and Perkins. Competition between these two coastal lines drove rates to unsustainable levels, forcing further industry consolidation. Pacific Mail Steamship Company exited the coastal shipping business and focused on its longer international routes. Five ships, including Senator, and all the facilities of the south coast line was sold to Goodall, Nelson, and Perkins in January 1875.

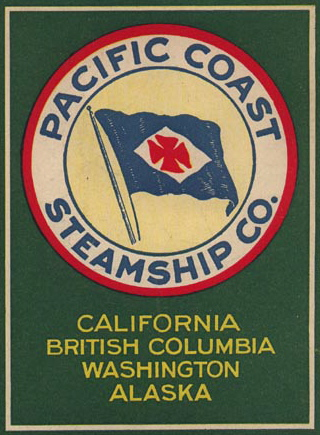

== Pacific Coast Steamship Company (1875 - 1882) ==
Senator continued her sailings between San Francisco and ports in Southern California for her new owners. When partner Chris Nelson retired in October 1876, Goodall, Nelson, and Perkins was reorganized as the Pacific Coast Steamship Company. By whatever name, her new owners invested a reported $15,000 in maintaining the vessel. She spent two months in the shipyard in 1875, receiving a new boiler and condenser, hull strengthening, and improved passenger quarters, among other improvements. After her refit, she went right back to her south coast route, but by now some of the smaller places had grown enough to warrant a stop. She sailed from San Francisco to San Luis Obispo, Ventura, Santa Barbara, landing at Stearns Wharf, San Pedro, and Anaheim.

While most of her career was spent sailing regularly scheduled runs between California ports, Senator was chartered for special sailings numerous times. She was chartered for celebrations and excursions. In 1872 she was chartered for $70,000 to move 20,000 sheep from Santa Cruz Island to the mainland. Foreshadowing the modern cruise ship industry, she ran cruise excursions on summer weekends, leaving and returning to San Francisco. In her later years, from 1879 on, she was sometimes used as a "spare boat", laid-up and idle until she was needed to take the place of a larger, younger vessel that had met with a disabling mishap. This was the case in 1880 when she replaced Orizaba which had broken a paddlewheel shaft.

== Obsolescence and New Zealand service (1882 - ca. 1912) ==
In May 1882, after 34 years at sea, Senator made her last voyage as a steamer. The Pacific Coast Steamship Company removed her engines and converted her into a barge. She was sold to a New Zealand firm, the Kamo Coal Company, in 1884 for use as a coal hulk in Auckland Harbor. Since her engines were gone, the new owners added temporary spars and rigging converting her into a barkentine sailing ship so she could cross the Pacific. Senator left San Francisco for the last time on March 25, 1884. She sailed with a fairly full load of general merchandise including machinery, 82 tons of salt, 5,000 pounds of sugar, 1,300 gallons of syrup, 100 barrels of flour, 52,000 feet of lumber, and 10 flasks of mercury. After this last commercial voyage, she became, in essence, a floating coal bin. Colliers would discharge their coal into Senator which would then distribute it to other ships and customers in Auckland needing fuel. Shortly after beginning this new service, in March 1885, the ship caught fire. Efforts to douse the flames were unsuccessful, and in a desperate effort to save the ship, holes were cut in the hull to scuttle her. She sank in shallow water, and after the fire was extinguished, Senator was pumped out, repaired, and got back to work dispensing coal. By 1906, Senator's timbers had become too unreliable for her service as a coal hulk. The Northern Steamship Company, her owner at the time, sold her to the Devonport Steam Ferry Company. A June 1912 newspaper article said she was broken up "recently", after which the ship disappears from press reports.

== Legacy ==
After decades of service on the California coast there were warm feelings for the Senator. One newspaper commented on the decision to convert her to a barge as, "like losing an old friend". The Pacific Coast Steamship Company commemorated the ship's service in 1897 by naming a new ship Senator. One of the company's owners commented that he hoped, "the new ship will follow worthily in the wake of her namesake."
