= Senator (1898 ship) =

Steel-hulled steamship

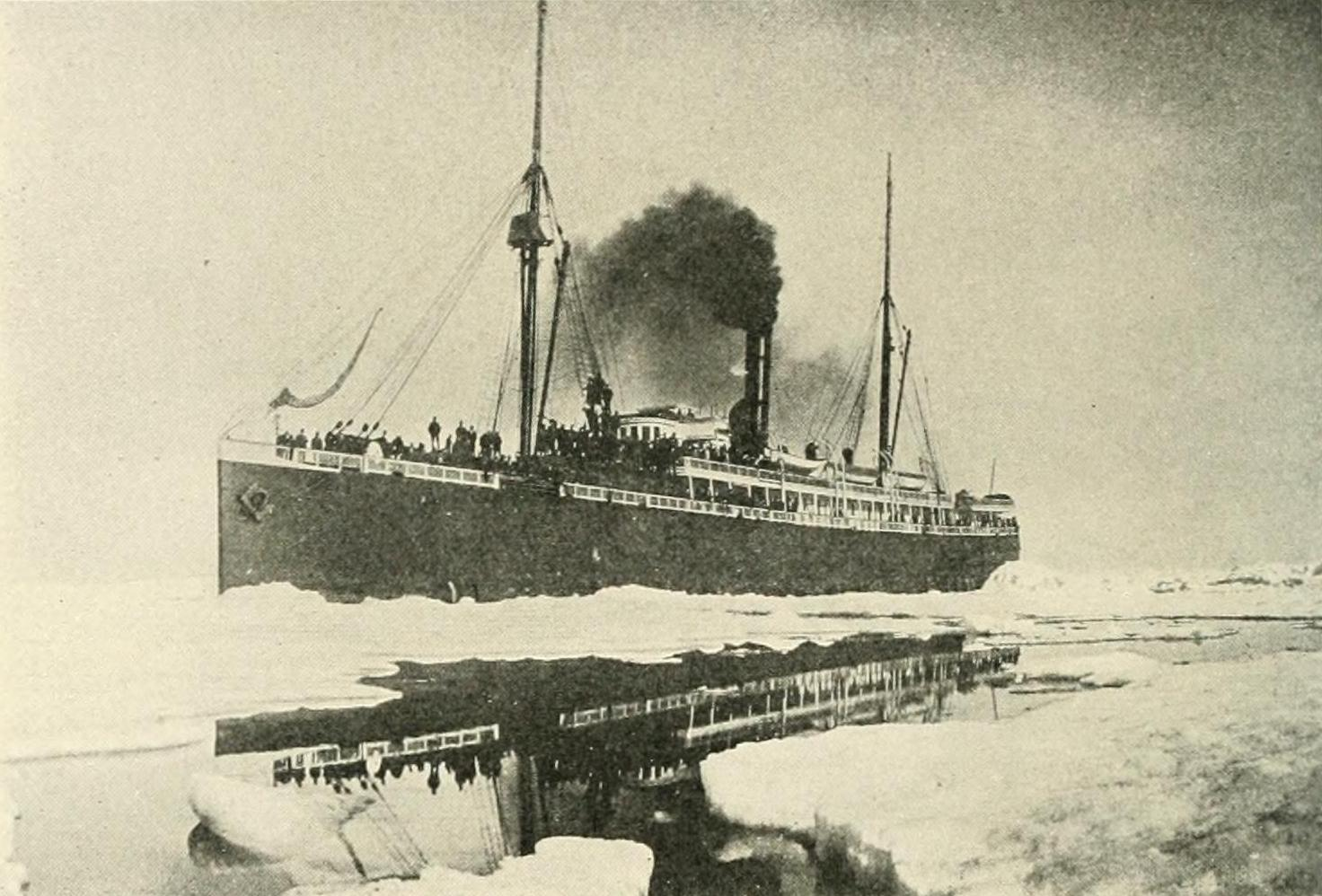
- Senator in Bering Sea ice

History

United States
- Name: Senator
- Namesake: Senator (1848 ship)
- Builder: Union Iron Works
- Launched: March 19, 1898
- Sponsored by: Miss Ella F. Goodall
- Recommissioned: Admiral Fiske in 1923
- Identification: Signal letters K.N.J.F.
- Fate: Scrapped in Japan in 1935

General characteristics
- Tonnage: 2,409 GRT, 1,835 NRT
- Length: 280 ft (85 m)
- Beam: 38.1 ft (11.6 m)
- Draft: 15 feet (4.6 m)
- Depth of hold: 19.6 feet (6.0 m)
- Installed power: 1,800 horsepower
- Speed: 13 knots
- Capacity: 110 cabin passengers, 300 steerage 1,500 tons of freight
- Crew: 65
- Notes: Official Number 116811

Senator was a steel-hulled steamship launched in 1898. She served as a troopship during the Spanish-American War and was an important part of the Nome gold rush. She spent thirty years in the coastwise shipping trade between Alaska and San Diego, until she was scrapped in Osaka, Japan in 1935.

== Construction ==
Senator was built for the Pacific Coast Steamship Company at Union Iron Works in San Francisco. She was launched on March 19, 1898 and was christened by Miss Ella F. Goodall.

Senator was 280 feet (85 m) long, with a beam of 38.1 feet (11.6 m). Her hold was 19.6 feet (6.0 m) deep. Her hull was made from steel plates riveted together. The ship had a double bottom to reduce flooding danger in the event of an accident.

As originally launched, Senator had 26 first-class staterooms and a similar number of second class cabins for a capacity of 110 cabin passengers and 300 steerage passengers. There were separate dining salons for first and second class passengers. She had electric light throughout the ship, which was quite advanced at the time of her launch. She could carry 1,500 tons of freight with 15 feet (4.6 m) of draft.

She was powered by a coal-fired triple-expansion steam engine which produced 1,800 horsepower. The cylinders had bores of 23 inches (0.58 m), 26 inches (0.66 m), and 50 inches (1.3 m), with a 36 feet (11 m) stroke. The engine drove a single propeller at up to 125 rpm, which in turn could drive the ship at 13 knots.

The ship was named after the sidewheel steamer Senator, which was one of the first ocean-going steamships on the California coast, and was owned by the Pacific Coast Steamship Company at the end of her career.

== Pacific Coast Steamship Company (1898 - 1916) ==
Press reports suggest that the Pacific Coast Steamship Company had originally planned to use Senator to replace Orizaba on runs between San Francisco and Mexico, or in the alternative, to replace Australia on runs to Dyea, Alaska to take advantage of the Klondike gold rush. Whatever the company's plans, they were superseded by the Spanish-American War, which was declared a month after Senator was launched. The U.S. government needed ships quickly to achieve its war aims and was unable to negotiate satisfactory terms of charter with their owners. In June 1898 Assistant Secretary of War Meiklejohn ordered a number of ships, including Senator, impressed into government service.

=== Spanish-American War (1898 - 1900) ===
The Army Transport Service employed Senator as a troop ship. In May 1898 she embarked the 1st Battalion of the 1st Washington Volunteer Infantry Regiment in Tacoma, Washington and sailed for San Francisco, where the Army concentrated troops for dispatch to the Philippines. On June 15, 1898 Senator sailed from San Francisco for Manila. She had the 1,023 officers and men of the 1st Regiment of Nebraska Volunteers on board. She stopped at Honolulu on June 24 to take on more coal and sailed on again two days later. Senator arrived at Cavite in Manila Bay on July 21, 1898.

Senator sailed back from Manila for San Francisco on August 24, 1898. On this return journey she carried 30 troops who were ill or whose enlistments had expired. The ship was days late to her coaling stop in Honolulu and concern was expressed that she, "may have been lost in the terrible typhoon." Finally, on September 18, 1898 she reached Oahu. She had indeed been caught in a typhoon and was forced to heave to for 32 hours. The ship sustained storm damage to the railing and machinery on her foredeck. She finally reached San Francisco on October 4, 1898 and was briefly quarantined because of the ill soldiers aboard.

The ship made five more trips to Manila as an Army troopship. She carried regular army units, including six companies of the 22nd Infantry Regiment, and portions of the 13th Infantry Regiment, as well as units of volunteer infantry regiments such as the 10th Pennsylvania, and the 45th United States. Early departures from San Francisco, at the height of patriotic fervor, were marked by parades, cheering crowds, and steam-whistle salutes from the other ships in the harbor. Later departures created "very little excitement."

Life aboard Senator was not luxurious for the troops. Some were seasick even before they reached the Golden Gate. The ship was vastly overcrowded, with more than twice as many passengers as she was originally designed to house. Food was also an issue. On one trip to Manila, the troops mutinied against the tinned beef they were served, calling it "embalmed beef" and had it thrown overboard. On a coaling stop in Honolulu, a fight among the overcrowded troops became a riot, and the ship sailed on with fifty men in irons.

On return trips to San Francisco, Senator stopped for coal at Tokyo, Yokohama, Nagasaki, Kobe, and Honolulu at various times. On early return trips she sailed home with but a handful of troops who were ill, injured, or discharged. After a year of war in the Philippines, however, entire Army units were scheduled to return home. Senator returned to San Francisco with 810 officers and men of the 51st Iowa Volunteer Infantry Regiment in October 1899. They were greeted by a band playing patriotic tunes, a delegation from San Francisco which granted the soldiers the "freedom of the city", and even the governor of Iowa, Leslie M. Shaw.

Senator was returned to her owners by the Army in February 1900. During her twenty months in government service she steamed almost 100,000 miles and carried over 10,000 men across the Pacific. The Army Transport Service paid the Pacific Coast Steamship Company $534,375 for the use of Senator during the war, or a little more than $900 per day. Further, the government paid to equip the ship with additional bunks and other fittings to convert her into a troopship. The management and cost of the Army Transport Service, particularly Senator, was the subject of a U.S. Senate inquiry in 1900. The assessed value of the ship was $400,000, so the headlines of the day had it that the government paid $134,375 more to charter the ship than she was worth. This simple calculation failed to consider that the charter fees also covered the cost of the crew, maintenance, and the restoration of the ship to its original condition, among other expenses.

=== Nome Gold Rush (1900) ===
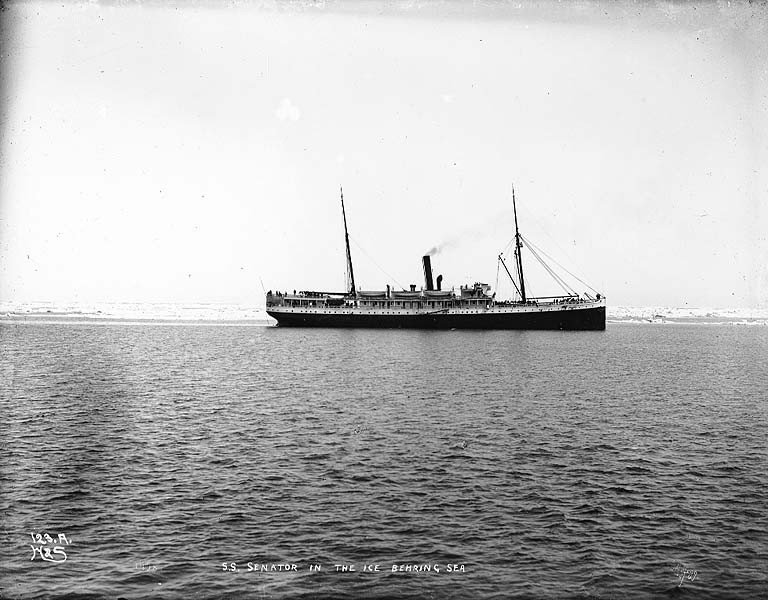
Senator in the Bering Sea, ca. 1900

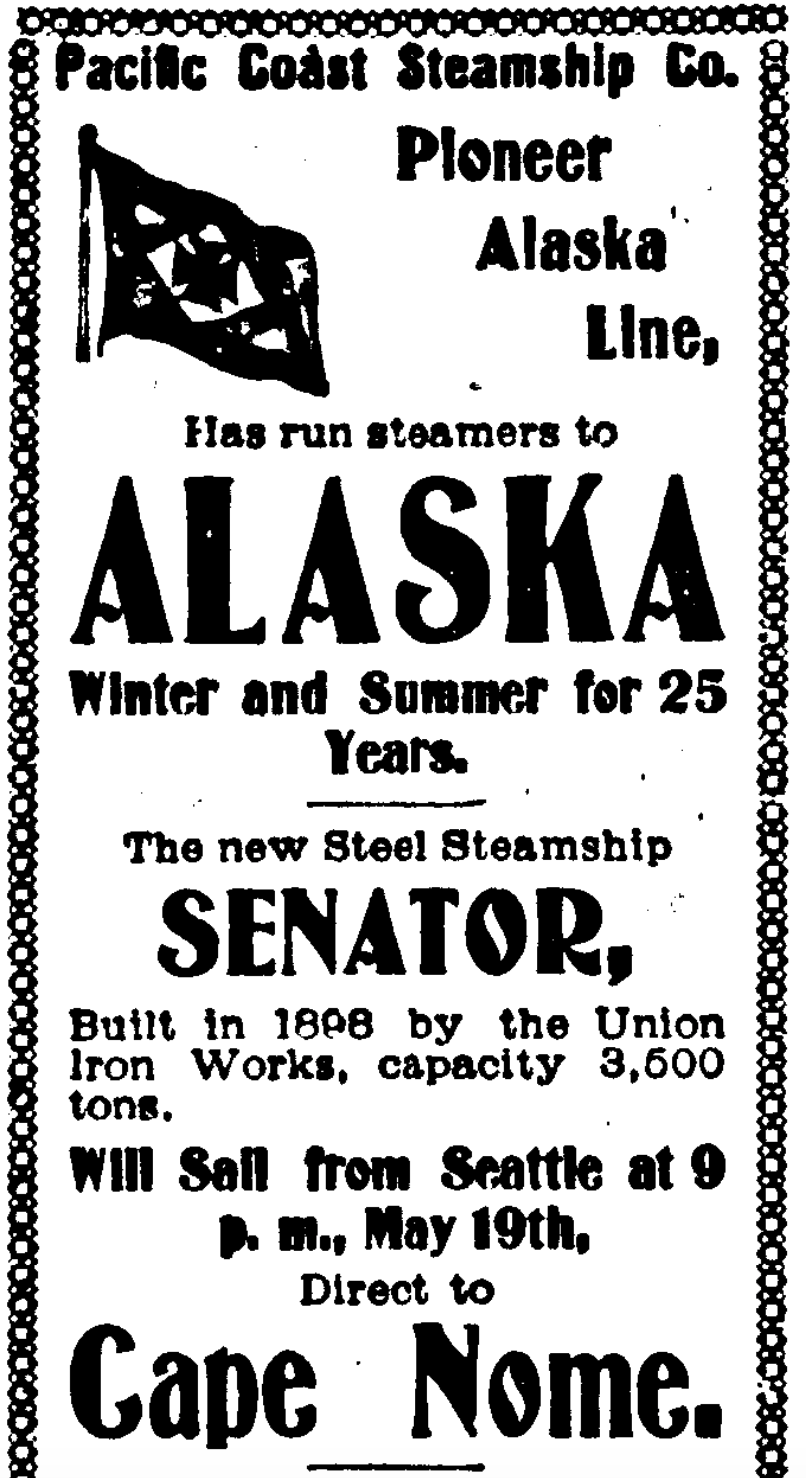
Advertisement for Senator's first trip to Nome in 1900

Gold was discovered in Anvil Creek in Nome, Alaska in 1898. By 1899 a full gold rush was underway. When it was discovered that there was gold not just in the creek, but also in the beach sand for miles around Nome, thousands more rushed to West Coast ports so they could sail to the scene in Spring 1900. Thus, within three weeks of Senator's return to her owners in February 1900, the Pacific Coast Steamship Company announced that the ship would sail from San Francisco to Nome via Seattle, Washington beginning in May, when the melting of the sea ice allowed navigation in the Bering Sea.

In the meantime, the bunkbeds and other troopship furnishings were ripped out and Senator went into the Merchants dry dock in San Francisco for a general overhaul. After this quick trip to the shipyard, she sailed between San Francisco and Seattle as a freighter, carrying coal and general cargo.

Her first trip to Nome was sold out, and she was not alone. An estimated 110 ships bound for Nome left Pacific ports in the Spring of 1900. Senator sailed from San Francisco on May 14, 1900, with 161 passengers aboard. She was one of five ships that headed north from that port on the 14th and 15th, which carried 1,161 passengers for Nome. Several of these ships, including Senator, stopped in Seattle, picking up additional passengers and freight. Senator sailed north from Seattle on May 20, 1900 with 440 passengers aboard. Not all of them were miners. Some were seeking their fortunes by serving the miners in the new boom town. Senator's cargo included bar fixtures, buggies, and a complete printing plant to establish Alaska's first newspaper, the Nome Daily News. In a real sense, Senator and the other ships sailing with her, were the Nome gold rush.

The eagerness of the rushers to reach the gold fields had the ships sailing north at the earliest conceivable moment. In the event, this proved too early as the sea ice had not retreated from Nome. On June 5, the ship was stopped by the ice 140 miles short of her destination. Her captain anchored Senator to the ice, along with about 20 other craft, waiting for the ice to break up. The Revenue Cutter USS Bear, an early icebreaker, passed close by en route to Nome. The captain of the Senator called out to Michael A. Healy, famed captain of the Bear, to ask if he could follow. Healy replied, "You can if you want to...", but the Senator's captain chose to remain behind. Senator's hull was dented, starting a leak, but she finally freed herself and back-tracked to Dutch Harbor, Alaska, making port on June 7, 1900. Her second attempt was successful, and Senator was able to reach Nome on June 12, 1900.

Only a small percentage of the gold rushers had any mining experience, so many of the men who were deposited on the beach at Nome had no idea how to find gold. Whatever their expertise, since 1900 was a couple of years after the original discovery, many of the best locations had already been taken. Some of the unskilled worked as laborers on other miners' claims, and as each new ship disembarked yet more men, wages fell. The cost of living was high, and the living was rough. Many had no shelter but a tent. Winter came early in Nome and once the sea ice returned there would be no more food or hope of escape. Consequently, Senator sailed back from Nome as fully booked as she was on the trip to the gold fields. According to one report, the demand to leave Nome was so great that the fares were doubled on the return trip. On one trip to Nome, the fare on Senator was $50 for a first class cabin and $25 for a second class, while on the return trip it was $100 and $85 respectively. The ship made it back to Seattle from her first trip to Nome on July 3, 1900. Senator made four more round trips between Seattle and Nome in 1900 before the sea ice closed in again. She returned to Seattle from Nome for the last time in 1900 on November 3. On her last four trips she brought back 1,058 passengers, most of whom had failed to make their fortunes. A few had done very well, however, and the ship carried a reported $1,195,000 of gold dust and nuggets back from Alaska in 1900.

=== Seasonal Service to Nome (1901 - 1916) ===
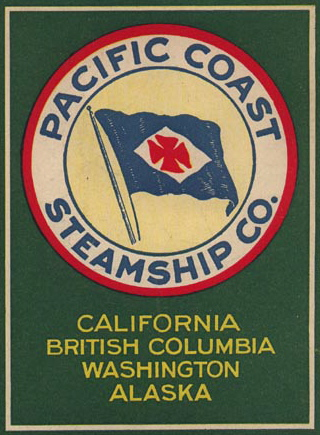

For the next six years, through 1906, Senator was one of the first ships to reach Nome in the Spring, typically around mid-June, and one of the last to return south in the Fall, typically arriving in Seattle in early November. She normally completed five round-trips per season, but in 1904 completed six. These trips usually included a stop at St. Michael, the port which serviced steamer travel up the Yukon River. Most of the sailings were relatively uneventful. This was not the case when the ship departed Seattle for Nome on June 1, 1902 with 260 passengers aboard. When the ship arrived at Nome on June 11, a young man from Ohio was found to have smallpox. The quarantine officer ordered to ship to Egg Island near St. Michael, Alaska, where the passengers were debarked for a two-week stay in tents. Senator left her passengers there and sailed back to Port Townsend, Washington, arriving July 3, 1902, without passengers since the ship would have to be fumigated and the crew quarantined on arrival.

Senator missed the 1907 Nome sailing season because she underwent a major overhaul. The ship was at the Risdon Iron Works shipyard in San Francisco from February to October 1907. She continue her Summer sailings to Nome from 1908 through 1916.

During the "closed season", that is when ice closed the Bering Sea to navigation in the Winter, the ship usually replaced another Pacific Coast Steamship Company vessel which had been disabled or was in need of repair. In November 1900, Senator was assigned to run between San Francisco, Seattle and Vancouver, British Columbia. She was reassigned to the Seattle - Skagway, Alaska route in January 1901 to replace the Pacific Coast Steamship Company's City of Topeka, which ran aground on Sullivan Island in Lynn Canal, south of Skagway. Senator's new route took her from Seattle to Vancouver, and then on to Alaska, stopping at Ketchikan, Wrangell, Juneau, and Skagway. On her first trip to Southeast Alaska, Senator almost replicated City of Topeka's accident. In the weak light of dawn in a dense fog, Senator grounded on a sand bar at Shelter Island in Lynn Canal. She floated off with the rising tide and continued her trip, but went into dry dock immediately upon her return to Seattle. Repairs required replacing 40 rivets in the keel and a new propeller. She headed north again the day after leaving the shipyard, February 2, 1901.

While the Southeast Alaska run did not have the urgency of the Nome gold rush, it did have its share of riches. The Treadwell mine in Juneau was producing gold, and Senator carried $50,000 of bullion back to Seattle in March 1901. Other cargoes were decidedly more mundane. When Senator left Vancouver for Southeast Alaska on April 17, 1901 she had on board machinery for the Treadwell mine, 60,000 feet of lumber for the White Pass Railway in Skagway, and livestock headed ultimately up the Yukon River, including 65 head of cattle, 50 hogs, and 200 sheep. Unfortunately, she also had a case of smallpox aboard. A woman from Seattle was diagnosed with the disease en route, and Captain J. B. Patterson duly informed the quarantine officer in Juneau upon Senator's arrival. No one was allowed to land, and no cargo except the mail came ashore (this was fumigated to kill any germs). The ship was ordered back to the Diamond Point, Washington quarantine station where most of the passengers and crew were kept in isolation for two weeks, and the ship was fumigated. In 1902, as in the previous year, Senator was assigned to the Southeast Alaska route after her last trip to Nome and almost immediately had an accident. This time she went aground on rocks at the north end of Wrangell Narrows. She floated off three hours later as the tide rose. Her damage was slight, but she was dry docked for repairs when she returned south. She completed the rest of the season in Southeast Alaska without incident.

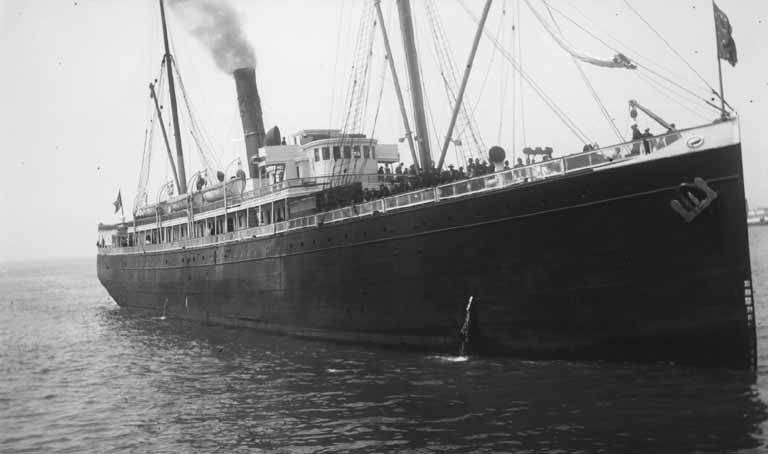
Senator in Seattle, ca. 1911

The Pacific Coast Steamship Company placed Senator on the Vancouver to San Francisco run during the winters of 1903 - 1904, 1904 -1905, 1912 - 1913, 1913 - 1914, and 1915 - 1916. During the Winter of 1905 - 1906, 1906 -1907, and 1908 - 1909 Senator was chartered to the San Francisco and Portland Steamship Company, a unit of E. H. Harriman's steamship empire, to replace ships that had been disabled or were otherwise unavailable. During these charters she ran between San Francisco and Portland.

Senator replaced the steamer Curacao in the Winters of 1909 - 1910, and 1911 - 1912, sailing from San Francisco south to San Pedro and Mexican ports, including Ensenada, La Paz, Mazatlan, and Guaymas. In the Winter of 1910 - 1911, the Pacific Coast Steamship Company placed the ship back on the Southeast Alaska run, replacing Cottage City, which was overhauled. In March 1911 Senator was chartered by the Alaska Packers Association to sail to Honolulu to recruit workers to seasonal jobs in its canneries. This was seen as a "raid" on Hawaii's labor force by the sugar plantations, and the territorial legislature considered a number of laws to prevent the solicitation of Hawaiian workers before the ship arrived. Senator's visit to Oahu was marked with legal troubles and she sailed back to San Francisco with only 145 of the 1000 hoped for workers aboard. When Senator reached San Francisco there was further trouble as the workers refused to leave Senator for a ship bound for the canneries until they had signed contracts for their work in the fish plants.

== Pacific Steamship Company (1916 - 1935) ==
While the Pacific Coast Steamship Company was one of the largest, it was by no means the only shipping company on the west coast. Competition was vigorous and consolidation among smaller companies was frequent. On November 1, 1916 the Pacific Coast Steamship Company and the Pacific-Alaska Navigation Company were merged to create the Pacific Steamship Company, which marketed itself as the "Admiral Line". The public rationale for the merger was to increase sailing frequencies by eliminating duplication between the two fleets, but it was clear that eliminating the duplication also meant eliminating competition. Senator became part of this new entity, then the largest coastwise shipping firm on the west coast of America.

While her ownership changed, Senator's initial day-to-day sailing schedule after the merger was familiar. She was assigned to the Los Angeles - San Francisco - Seattle route, and made several sailings with freight only to meet the demands of a growing economy. She was back to Nome in the Summer of 1917, and then sailed once again between San Francisco and Seattle. Later in 1917, her work changed. She was briefly employed between Seattle and Honolulu. She completed a Seattle - Singapore round-trip later in 1917 returning with a full load of rubber, rice, and other Asian commodities. Senator sailed continuously between Seattle and Singapore and Hong Kong through June 1919, when she returned to her familiar Seattle-Nome routing.

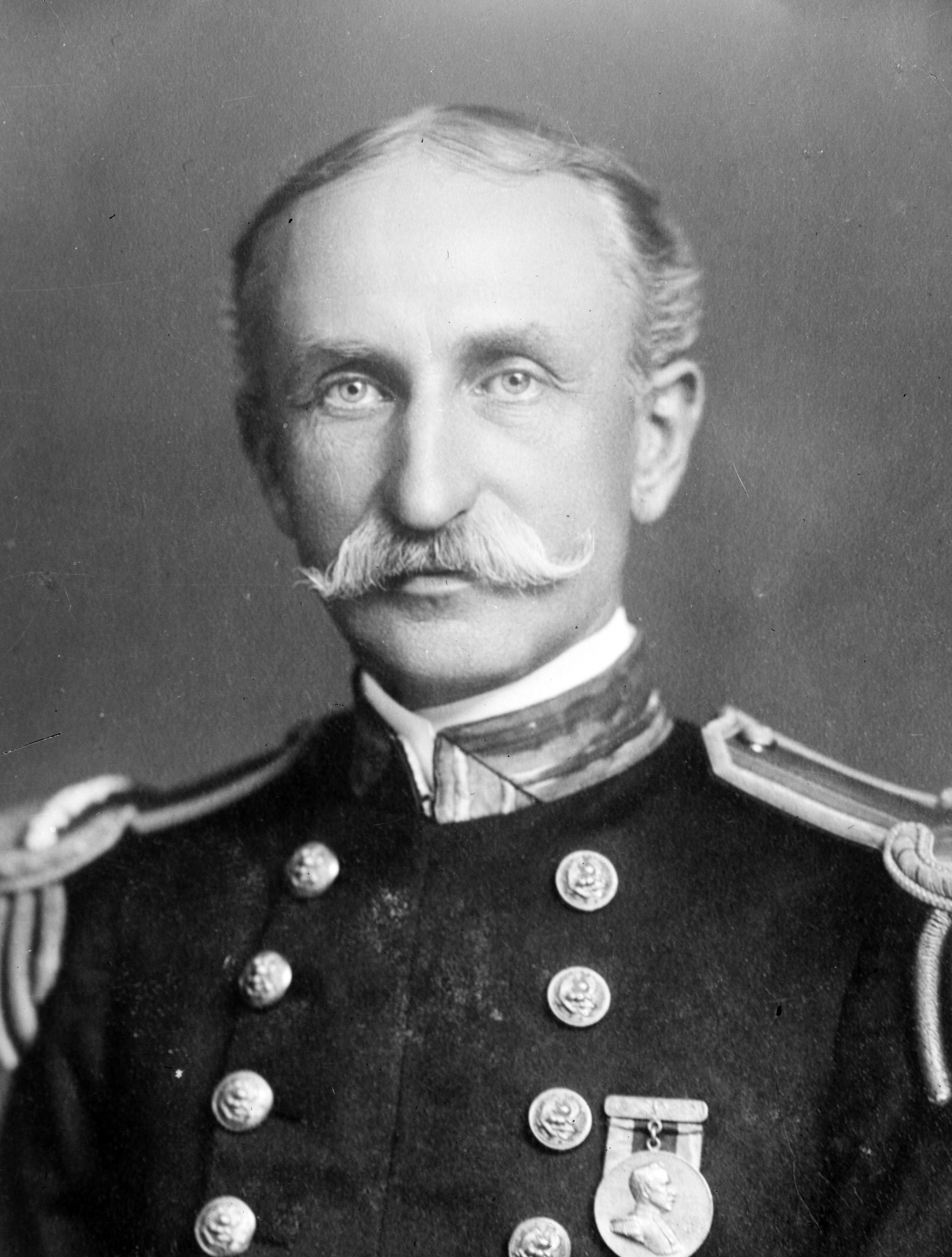
Admiral Bradley A. Fiske, the ship's namesake

In December 1919, Senator opened a new route from San Francisco to Corinto, Nicaragua, with stops in Southern California and Mexico. This routing was discontinued in May 1921 and she was assigned to run up and down the west coast from San Diego to Portland. The ship was withdrawn from this route in November 1922, when she went into the shipyard for a general overhaul. The General Engineering and Drydock Company of Alameda won the bid for the work at a price of $27,500. When the overhaul was completed in March 1923, the ship was renamed Admiral Fiske, to conform with the Admiral Line's naming convention. Her new name honored U.S. Navy Rear Admiral Bradley Allen Fiske. The reconditioned Admiral Fiske returned to her familiar San Diego to Portland route. In 1926, a ticket from Los Angeles to San Francisco aboard Admiral Fiske cost $14, while $36 would take you to Portland.

At about 10:30 p.m. on September 1, 1928, Admiral Fiske rammed the American-Hawaiian Steamship Company's freighter Floridian in a dense fog. Both ships were headed to Seattle and were off the Washington coast, about 65 miles south of Tatoosh Island at the time of the collision. Despite the fact that Floridian was more than twice as large as Admiral Fiske, she was sunk in the accident. Floridian crossed in front of Admiral Fiske and the collision opened an 8' by 4' hole in her hull that flooded her engine room and cargo hold. Admiral Fiske was able to save all 43 of her crew (but not the ship's cat and parrot) and stood by Floridian until about 4 a.m. when the sinking ship was lost in the fog. Admiral Fiske's forepeak water-tight bulkhead was leaking slightly, but the ship made Seattle under her own power. The investigation of the accident exonerated the navigation officers of both ships and blamed the fog for the collision.

Admiral Fiske was withdrawn from service for repairs after the collision, but these were completed quickly. By mid-October 1928, she was once again sailing up and down the west coast from San Diego to Seattle. As the Great Depression deepened, the ship was idled in September 1931. In September 1934, five Admiral Line steamers, including Admiral Fiske, were sold for scrap to Fukuoka Steel Company of Osaka, Japan for $4,500 each. The ship sailed from San Francisco for the last time in January 1935, heavily laden with additional scrap iron. She was broken up in Osaka.
