= California Steam Navigation Company =

House flag of California Steam Navigation Company

The California Steam Navigation Company was formed in 1854 to consolidate competing steamship companies in the San Francisco Bay Area and on the Sacramento and San Joaquin Rivers. It was successful in this effort and established a profitable near-monopoly which it maintained by buying out or bankrupting new competitors. In response to the Fraser Canyon gold rush and economic growth in the Pacific Northwest, the company expanded to ocean routes from San Francisco north to British Columbia. Similarly, as California's economy grew, the company offered service from San Francisco south to San Pedro and San Diego. It exited these markets in 1867 when competition drove prices to unprofitable levels. While the California Steam Navigation Company was successful throughout its life in suppressing steamboat competition on its core Bay Area and river routes, it could not control the rise of railroads. These new competitors reduced the company's revenue and profit. Finally, in 1871, the company's assets were purchased by the California Pacific Railroad, and the corporation was dissolved.

== Early history ==
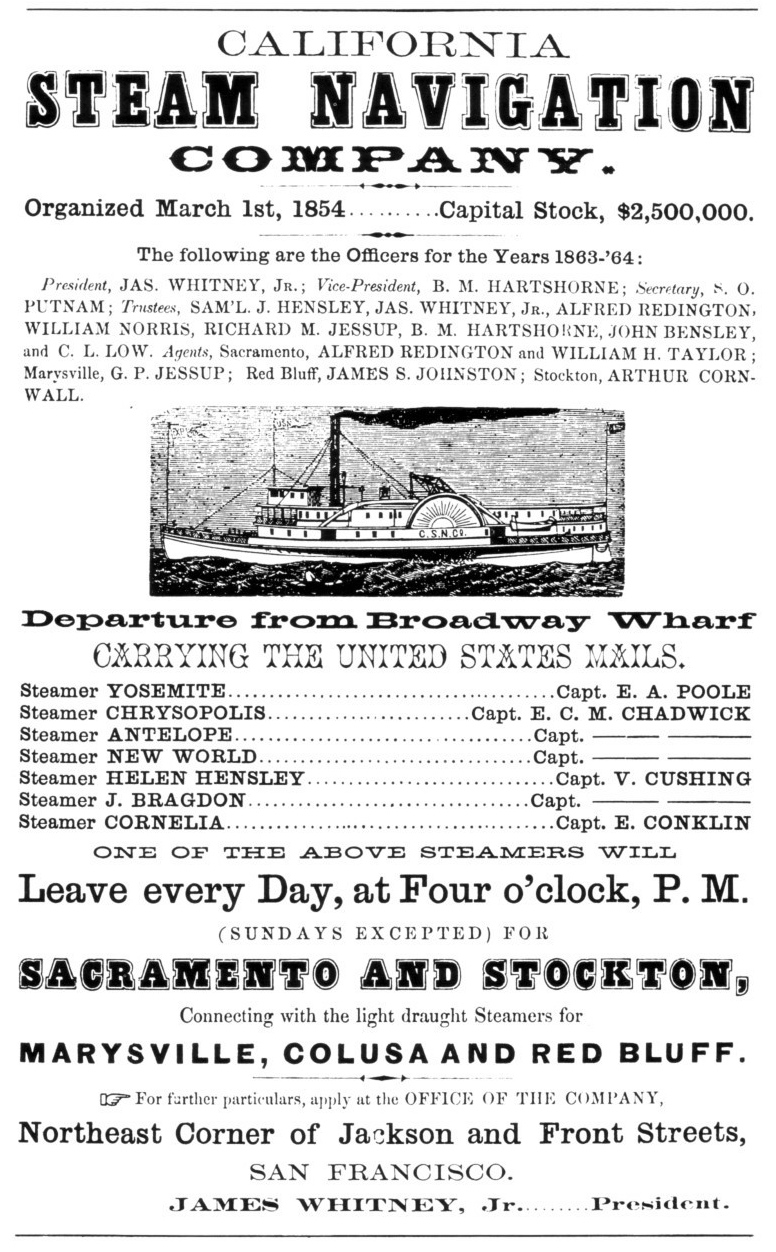
1863 advertisement

In the 1840s and 1850s, road and rail networks in the Bay Area and inland California were primitive. Steamboats and the barges they towed played an important part in moving people, agricultural commodities, and other goods around the region. Numerous wharves and depots sprang up in San Francisco Bay, San Pablo Bay, and Suisan Bay. Steamers also ascended the rivers that emptied into these bays, notably the Sacramento River and San Joaquin River. The Sacramento River was navigable for 250 miles and in periods of high water even further upstream. The Feather River, a tributary of the Sacramento, was navigable beyond Marysville during portions of the year. The San Joaquin was navigable year-round as far as Stockton and in periods of high water, steamers could reach into Fresno County, about 200 miles from the river's mouth.

In 1848 there were but two steamers on the Sacramento River. You could travel from San Francisco to Sacramento for $30 with a cabin, or for $20 on deck. As the California gold rush began, the number of ships sailing on the Sacramento River shot to sixteen in just eighteen months, all of them built in eastern shipyards and sailed around Cape Horn. By 1851 fares had dropped to $1 as all the new ships fought for customers. To make matters worse for the shipping companies, they ordered additional steamers during the boom times and they began to arrive. With loans to pay, the ship owners had no choice but to put them into service, despite the already ruinous level of competition. By 1853 there were 25 steamers running the Sacramento River alone.

The steamboat owners ended their unprofitable competition by combining almost all the vessels that served the inland trade. On February 22, 1854 the California Steam Navigation Company was incorporated under the laws of California. The company's initial shareholders included Richard Chenery, Captain James Whitney, Jr., Marshall Hubbard, John Bensley, Frederick Low and Major Samuel J. Hensley. All five men served as president of the company at various times.

== Inland competition ==
The new California Steam Navigation Company moved quickly to retire excess capacity: 23 ships were idled. The combination effectively eliminated competition on the Sacramento and San Joaquin Rivers. This allowed the company to raise rates and profitability returned for the company's owners. This profitability lured new competitors, just as it did in 1850. Individual boats such as Surprise and Martin White began service in 1855. Rates from San Francisco to Sacramento fell as low as $0.25 per passenger as the California Steam Navigation Company sought to eliminate the thinly-capitalized newcomers.

In their outrage at freight rates that were raised to $40/ton after the consolidation, Marysville merchants formed the Citizens' Steam Navigation Company to compete with the company in 1854. It's competitive steamer, Enterprise, carried the freight for $12/ton. Not content to have any competition, the California Steam Navigation Company lowered its rate to $1/ton. Citizens' Steam Navigation Company built a larger ship, Queen City, but at the low prices they had to charge to compete, it lost money on every load. Citizen's Steam Navigation could not find sufficient financing to continue operations under these circumstances. On October 1, 1855 it signed a contract giving the California Steam Navigation Company control over its ships, effectively reinstating the company's monopoly on transportation to Marysville.

The general public and the local business community loathed the California Steam Navigation Company for its monopoly rates and the harsh tactics it used to suppress competition. One newspaper went so far as to editorialize that all candidates for the state legislature should pledge, "eternal opposition to the California Steam Navigation Company"

== Ocean and coastal service ==
The Fraser Canyon gold rush created an immediate and large demand for transportation from the Bay Area to British Columbia beginning in 1857. The "forty-niners" who rushed to the California goldfields now rushed to mine the new Canadian workings. Similarly, California's growing economy created new demand for transportation to the south as well. The California Steam Navigation Company used a few of its largest steamers for these new routes and acquired other ocean-going ships to meet this demand. Pacific was purchased in 1859. Brother Jonathan was purchased and refit in 1861. Ajax and Orizaba were purchased in 1865. California was built for the company in 1866.

In 1856 Senator began "South Coast" service between San Francisco and San Diego with stops in San Luis Obispo, Santa Barbara, and San Pedro. Orizaba began sailing to the "South Coast" in 1865. In 1859 Pacific began service to Victoria with stops in Crescent City and Portland and was later joined by Brother Jonathan, and Active. California sailed this route as well, beginning in 1866. In January 1866 the California Steam Navigation established another ocean route, offering the first regular steamship service between San Francisco and the Hawaiian Islands using its steamer Ajax. After only two round trips, however, the company put her on the San Francisco - Portland route to counter new competitive pressure.

These new ocean routes brought the company into contact with new competitors. In the north, the Pacific Mail Steamship Company sold its business to the California, Oregon, and Mexico Steamship Company in 1861. Ben Holladay, a tough steamboat pioneer, ran this dominant company. At the time of the acquisition It had five steamboats on the San Francisco - Victoria route to the two (Pacific and Brother Jonathan) deployed by the California Steam Navigation Company. In 1862, an infected passenger onboard the Brother Jonathan introduced smallpox to Victoria, setting off the 1862 Pacific Northwest smallpox epidemic.

Holladay added more ships, but the two companies appeared to have an understanding that prevented a rate war. This changed in 1865 when Jarvis Patton established the Anchor Line, and put his ship Montana on the San Francisco - Victoria line. He cut prices to gain customers, but with only one ship on the route, the pricing equilibrium between the two main competitors more or less remained. In 1866, however, Patton built Idaho, and a full-scale rate war broke out. Profitability went out of the northern route.

== Decline ==
In 1867, the fare war on the northern route forced consolidation. The California, Oregon, and Mexico Steamship Company bought the entire ocean-going fleet of the California Steam Navigation Company. It bought Active, Ajax, California, Orizba, Pacific, and Senator. This forced the California Steam Navigation Company back to its Bay Area core, which itself was suffering from competition from new railroads.

On March 31, 1871, the California Pacific Railroad Company acquired all property of the California Steam Navigation Company. This included thirty-two sidewheel and sternwheel steamships, twenty-one barges, twenty wharves and depots, and the franchises that allowed the ships to sail. Cash from the asset sale was distributed to shareholders and the company was disincorporated in September 1871. The railroad continued the operation of the steamboats, integrating them with its own routes and pricing scheme. The steamboat-railroad merger was driven by the same desire to reduce competition that had driven the previous steamboat company mergers. Five months later, the Central Pacific Railroad acquired the California Pacific Railroad Company, creating an even more powerful transportation monopoly.

In a confusing epilog to the corporation's history, a new and unrelated steamboat company was created after the disincorporation which was also called the California Steam Navigation Company. It too, ran steamboats on the Sacramento River, but in this new world it was the upstart competitor under-cutting the monopoly rates of the entrenched incumbent. This second California Steam Navigation Company passed out of existence in June 1889 when it merged with the San Joaquin Improvement Company to become the California Steam and Improvement Company.

== Fleet ==
The California Steam Navigation Company owned and chartered dozens of ships, barges, tugs, and boats. Relatively few were in full-time service on specific routes. Some were operated only seasonally to meet the peak demand of the summer harvest time, when ships and barges would bring crops from the interior to San Francisco. Some were operated only when high water allowed passage to ports further inland on the rivers. Some ships were held in reserve, to replace vessels that were due for maintenance or were damaged. Some ships were used as storeships, floating warehouses and offices. Some vessels were anchored or moored and never used. These were typically ships bought from competitors to keep them from competing, or obsolete ships that the company would not sell for fear of them falling into the hands of potential competitors. The company established a base for its unemployed ships in Oakland. Below is a partial list of the company's ships and barges with a focus on how they came to be part of and then left the fleet.

=== Ships ===
Active (sidewheel steamer): She was built for the Sacramento River route in 1849. She was purchased by the United States Coast Survey in 1852. The United States Government sold the ship for $30,000 in June 1862. After a variety of private charters, the company acquired her no later than April 1866. The ship was, in turn, acquired from the company by the California, Oregon, and Mexico Steamship Company in 1867. She hit a rock and was wrecked south of Cape Mendocino in 1870.

Ajax (propeller steamer): Built in Brooklyn, New York in 1864, she was purchased by the company with California in 1865 for $250,000. The ship was acquired from the company by the California, Oregon, and Mexico Steamship Company in 1867.

Amador (sidewheel steamer): She was built for the company and entered service in October 1869. She was acquired from the company by the California Pacific Railroad Company in 1871.

Amelia (sidewheel steamer): She was launched in 1863 originally as a San Francisco Bay ferry, running between Alviso and San Francisco. In 1868, Amelia was one of the first steamers in the Bay Area to convert from coal to oil for fuel. She was acquired from the company by the California Pacific Railroad Company in 1871.

American Eagle: She was one of the original ships consolidated into the company in 1854, The ship was damaged in a boiler explosion and thereafter lay moored on the levee in Sacramento for several years. In 1859 her topsides were removed and she was converted into a barge.

Anna Abernethy (sidewheel steamer): She ran as a competitor to the company on the Marysville - San Francisco route beginning in 1854. She was taken over by the company by 1856. She broke her drive shaft while on the Petaluma - San Francisco run in 1857.

Antelope (sidewheel steamer): The ship reached the Bay Area in 1851 by sailing around Cape Horn. In California she sailed for the "Independent Line" and was one of the vessels consolidated into the California Steam Navigation Company when it was formed in 1854. The vessel was acquired from the company by the California Pacific Railroad Company in 1871.

Banner (sternwheel steamer): She was a light draft vessel which began competing with the company on the upper reaches of the Sacramento River in May 1862. By December 1863 she had been acquired by the company. The ship was burned and nearly destroyed by an arsonist in December 1864. She was repaired and returned to the river in May 1866 to compete with the company again. She was back in the company's fleet no later than 1868. She was acquired by the California Pacific Railroad Company in 1871. By 1872 her machinery was removed and she was slated to be broken up.

Belle: She was one of the original vessels consolidated into the company in 1854. On February 5, 1856 her boilers exploded killing about two dozen people. The ship appears to have been repaired, but renamed Swan (see below), so as to disassociate her with the disaster.

Brother Jonathan (sidewheel steamer): She was purchased by the company and refit in 1861. She sank with the loss of perhaps 225 lives in 1865.

C. M. Weber: The ship entered service on the Stockton run in April 1851 and was one of the original vessels consolidated into the company in 1854.

California: She was acquired with Ajax for $250,000 from the New York shipping firm of Wakeman, Gookin & Dickinson in 1865. She was acquired from the company by the California, Oregon, and Mexico Steamship Company in 1867.

Capital (sidewheel steamer): The ship was built for the company and launched on November 5, 1865. She was acquired from the company by the California Pacific Railroad Company in 1871.

Captain Sutter (sternwheel steamer): The ship was one of the original vessels consolidated into the company in 1854. She sank at her berth in October 1855 and was not repaired due to her poor condition.

Chrysopolis (sidewheel steamer): The ship was built for the company at the cost of $200,000 in San Francisco and launched in June 1860. She was acquired from the company by the California Pacific Railroad Company in 1871

Camanche: She was built in the Bay Area and launched in 1851. The ship sank after a collision with J. Bragdon in January 1853. Ten lives were lost. She was repaired and returned to service, becoming one of the ships that was consolidated into the company in 1854. It is likely that she was converted into a barge of the same name by 1858.

Clara: She was one of the original ships consolidated into the company and was used briefly as a ferry to Alameda. The ship was sold in July 1854 for $9,000 and disappears from Bay Area press accounts.

Cleopatra: She was one of the original vessels consolidated into the company in 1854. Her machinery was removed and she was broken up in 1862, with her pilot house transferred to Goodman Castle.

Confidence: She was acquired in New York by John Bensley and sent to San Francisco in 1849. The ship was one of the original vessels consolidated into the company in 1854.

Cora (sidewheel steamer): She was acquired from the company by the California Pacific Railroad Company in 1871.

Cornelia (sidewheel steamer): She was one of the original vessels consolidated into the company in 1854. She was acquired from the company by the California Pacific Railroad Company in 1871. She was condemned as unseaworthy in 1872.

Daniel Moore: She was one of the original vessels consolidated into the company in 1854.

Defiance (sidewheel steamer): She began competing with the company in July 1860. She was acquired by the California Pacific Railroad Company in 1871.

Dover (sternwheel steamer): The ship was built for the company in San Francisco and launched in 1869. She was purchased by the California Pacific Railroad Company in 1871.

Eclipse: She was launched in December 1854 as a competitor to the company. By mid-1855, the company controlled the ship. She was converted into a barge of the same name.

Eliza: Built in 1824 and sailed around Cape Horn in 1850, she was one of the original vessels consolidated into the company in 1854. She was broken-up in 1868.

Enterprise: She was built for the competitive Citizen's Steam Navigation Company for the Marysville to San Francisco run. Her first trip with passengers aboard was made on July 27, 1854. She was taken over by the company when it drove its competitor out of business in 1855. In 1863 her boilers and machinery were removed and installed in a new steamboat to be used in China.

Express: She was one of the original vessels consolidated into the company in 1854. The ship was owned by the company at least until 1856. In June 1870, the ship was owned by an independent operator that competed with the company on the San Francisco - Oakland route. This venture failed, and the ship was sold at auction for $1,200 on January 12, 1872

Flora (sternwheel steamer): The ship was built for the company's trade with Marysville, and thus had an exceptionally shallow draft of 11 inches. She was launched in 1865. She was acquired by the California Pacific Railroad Company in 1871.

Gaudeloupe: She was one of the original vessels consolidated into the company in 1854.

Gazelle: She was one of the original vessels consolidated into the company in 1854.

Gem (sternwheel steamer): She was sailing for the company in 1854, but after the original consolidation. She was acquired from the company by the California Pacific Railroad Company in 1871.

Globe: She was one of the original vessels consolidated into the company in 1854. The ship was used as the company's office for a time and as a storeship.

Goodman Castle (sternwheel steamer): The ship was built in the Bay Area and began sailing as a competitor to the company in 1858. By February 1859 this venture had failed and the company owned the ship. She was acquired by the California Pacific Railroad Company in 1871 and broken up in 1875.

Governor Dana: She was one of the original vessels consolidated into the company in 1854.

Governor Dana III (sternwheel steamship): She was a shallow draft vessel built for the company's Sacramento-Marysville route. She was launched on October 29, 1863

H. T. Clay: The ship's frames were constructed in New Orleans and then sent to San Francisco where they were assembled in 1850. She was one of the original vessels consolidated into the company in 1854

Hartford: The ship sailed from New York to San Francisco, arriving January 24, 1849. She was nearly destroyed in a fire in early 1851, but was rebuilt and became one of the original vessels consolidated into the company in 1854. She was dismantled in 1855.

Helen Hensley (sidewheel steamer): The ship was built by Samuel J. Hensley. She was one of the original vessels consolidated into the company in 1854. She suffered a boiler explosion later that year. She was acquired from the company by the California Pacific Railroad Company in 1871.

Henrietta (sternwheel steamer) She was built for $12,000 in 1857 to compete with the company, but her owner died before she entered service. The company owned her before the end of the year. Her engine was sold and exported to China in 1863

J. Bragdon (sidewheel steamer): She was one of the original vessels consolidated into the company in 1854. Her machinery was removed and reinstalled in Paul Pry in 1864. Her hull was converted into a barge.

James Blair (sternwheel steamer): She was built in the Bay Area to compete with the company and launched in 1857. This venture failed and by April 1858, the ship was owned by the company.

Julia (sidewheel steamer): The ship was built for the company's Stockton route and launched on August 18, 1864. She was acquired from the company by the California Pacific Railroad Company in 1871.

Kate Kearney: She was listed as unemployed in 1856. The company appears to have sold the ship that year.

Lark (sternwheel Steamer): She was acquired by the California Pacific Railroad Company in 1871. Lark was broken up in 1876

Marysville

New World: She was one of the original vessels consolidated into the company in 1854. The ship was sold to the Oregon Steam Navigation Company in May 1864 for $75,000.

Orient: She was one of the original vessels consolidated into the company in 1854. She sank in the Old River and her machinery was removed in 1858. She was converted into a barge.

Orizaba (sidewheel steamer): The ship was purchased from the Pacific Mail Steamship Company in 1865 for $60,000. She was acquired from the company by the California, Oregon, and Mexico Steamship Company in 1867.

Pacific (side wheel steamer): She was purchased from the Pacific Mail Steamship Company in 1860. She was acquired from the company by the California, Oregon, and Mexico Steamship Company in 1867.

Paul Pry (sidewheel steamer): The ship was built in San Francisco in 1854. She was acquired from the company by the California Pacific Railroad Company in 1871.

Pike: She was one of the original vessels consolidated into the company in 1854. She was broken up in 1860.

Plumas (sternwheel steamer): She was one of the original vessels consolidated into the company in 1854. On July 11, 1854 she hit a snag and sank on the Sacramento River. Her machinery was salvaged but the rest of the ship was a total loss.

Queen City: The ship was built for the competitive Citizens Steam Navigation Company and launched in September 1854. She was taken over by the company when it drove its competitor out of business in 1855.

Red Bluff (sternwheel steamer): She was acquired by the California Pacific Railroad Company in 1871.

Reliance (propeller steamer): She was acquired by the California Pacific Railroad Company in 1871.

Republic:

Sam Soule

San Antonio: She was converted into a barge.

Senator: The ship was built in New York originally for trade on the New England coast. In response to the California gold rush, she was sent around Cape Horn, reaching San Francisco in 1849. She was one of the original vessels consolidated into the company in 1854. She was acquired from the company by the California, Oregon, and Mexico Steamship Company in 1867.

Shasta: She was one of the original vessels consolidated into the company in 1854, but it appears she was idled immediately and never sailed again

Sophie: She was one of the original vessels consolidated into the company in 1854.

Sophie McLean: The ship was built for the company's San Francisco - San Jose route. She was launched on January 18, 1859. The vessel blew up at the dock while getting up steam in October 1865.

Surprise: She was built in San Francisco and had her sea trial on April 2, 1855. She ran in competition to the company, but by November 1855 she had been sold to the company. Unlike many of the California Steam Navigation Company's surplus vessels, Surprise was sold, but in a way that guaranteed she would never come back to compete with the company's ships. Her new owners took her to China, via Honolulu, in May 1861 to carry freight on the Yangtze River. She sailed into the middle of the Taiping rebellion, was fired upon by shore batteries, and eventually burned at Shanghai.

Swallow (sternwheel steamer): She was built in San Francisco for the company and launched in November 1860. The ship's machinery was reused from Willamette.

Swan: The ship was originally named Belle (see above), but was renamed after a fatal boiler explosion. She was refit at a shipyard on the American River and launched on December 15, 1856.

Thomas Hunt: She was one of the original vessels consolidated into the company in 1854. She was not needed in the Bay Area after the consolidation and was sold to run on the Columbia River. She returned to San Francisco briefly to refit for service on the coast of China.

Urilda: Built in 1851, she was one of the original vessels consolidated into the company in 1854. She was converted into a barge in 1860.

Victor (sternwheel steamer): She was built in the Bay Area and launched in 1859 to compete with the company on the San Francisco - Marysville route. She never made a competitive trip and by January 1860 was owned by the company. She was acquired from the company by the California Pacific Railroad Company in 1871.

Willamette: Beginning in late 1854, she competed for a time with the company's ships on the Sacramento River. The company lowered prices making Willamette unprofitable. Her owners were forced to sell the ship to the California Steam Navigation Company, which chose to simply moor the ship and let it rot. She was eventually broken up and her machinery used in Swallow.

Wilson G. Hunt (sidewheel steamer): She was acquired in New York by John Bensley and sent to San Francisco in 1849. She was one of the original vessels consolidated into the company in 1854. The ship was acquired from the company by the Canadian Pacific Railway in 1871.

Yosemite (sidewheel steamer): The ship was built for the company in San Francisco and launched in 1862. She was acquired from the company by the California Pacific Railroad Company in 1871.

Young America

=== Barges ===
'76: She was acquired by the California Pacific Railroad Company in 1871.

Camanche: Converted from steamer. She was acquired by the California Pacific Railroad Company in 1871.

Eclipse: Converted from steamer. She was acquired by the California Pacific Railroad Company in 1871.

J. Bragdon: Converted from steamer. She was acquired by the California Pacific Railroad Company in 1871.

Little Giant

Orient: Converted from steamer. She was acquired by the California Pacific Railroad Company in 1871.

Pardee.

Rolla

San Antonio: Converted from steamer. She was acquired by the California Pacific Railroad Company in 1871.
