= Ajax (1864 ship) =

American steamship

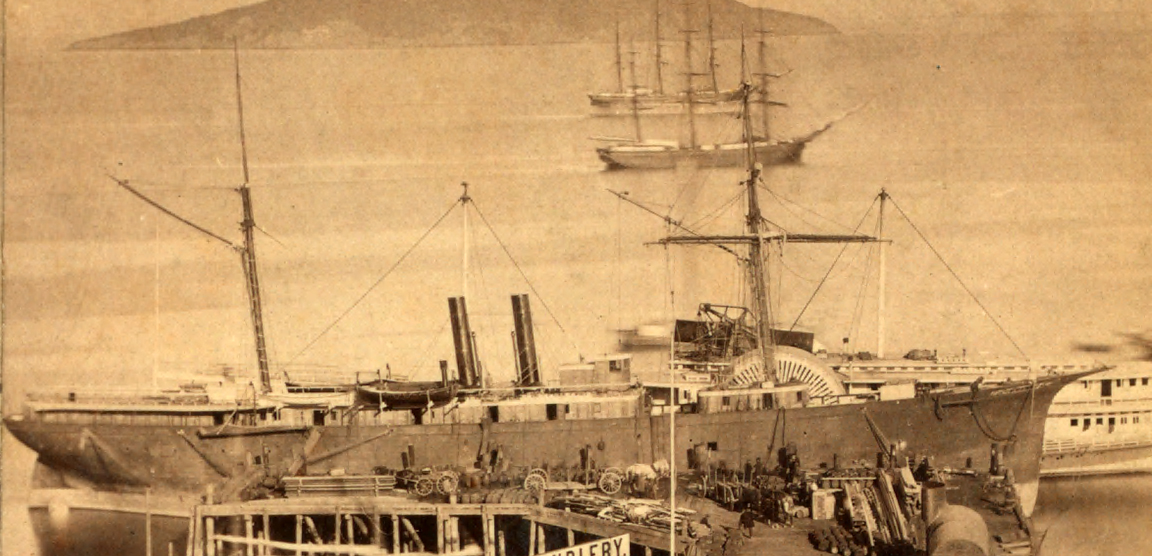
- Ajax at the Greenwich Street Wharf in San Francisco

History

United States
- Name: Ajax
- Builder: C. & R. Poillon Shipyard (New York, NY)
- Launched: October 6, 1864
- Identification: Signal Letters H.T.C.Q.

General characteristics
- Tons burthen: 1,354
- Length: 235 ft 5 in (71.76 m)
- Beam: 35 ft (11 m)
- Draft: 15 ft (4.6 m)
- Depth of hold: 25 ft (7.6 m)
- Decks: 3
- Installed power: 400 HP steam engine
- Propulsion: Single propeller, 13' 6" in diameter
- Sail plan: Brigantine
- Speed: 12 knots
- Capacity: 200 first class passengers, several hundred steerage passengers, 2000 tons of freight
- Armament: 24 pound Parrott rifle
- Notes: Official number 1210

Ajax was a wooden, propeller-driven steamship built in 1864. She provided logistical support to the Union Army on the Atlantic coast during the American Civil War. After the war she was sent to San Francisco where she provided freight and passenger services between that city and other ports on the Pacific coast. She provided the first scheduled steamship service between the United States and Hawaii.

== Construction and launch ==
It is not clear if Ajax was built for government service, or if the ship was intended as a commercial venture. Cornelius and Richard Poillon operated a shipyard in Brooklyn, New York at the foot of Bridge Street on the East River. They built a variety of yachts, commercial vessels, and warships for the United States and other nations. Their ships USS Grand Gulf, USS Winona, and USS New Berne were all purchased by the U.S. Navy for service in the Civil War. Given the shipyard's relationship with the US government, the Poillon's may have had a charter contract in hand before beginning construction on Ajax. In any case, shortly after her launch on October 6, 1864 she was chartered for use by the Quartermaster Corps of the Union Army to provide logistical support along the Atlantic coast for Civil War operations.

Ajax was the largest ship ever built by the C. & R. Poillon shipyard. She was 235 ft 5 in (71.76 m) long, with a beam of 35 ft (11 m), and a draft of 15 ft (4.6 m). Ajax had a wooden hull built from white oak, hackmatack, and locust.

She was rigged as a brigantine, and could sail, but her primary propulsion was provided by a steam engine driving a single propeller. The engine had a single cylinder 54 inches (1.4 m) in diameter with a piston stroke of 52 inches (1.3 m). It produced a nominal 400 horsepower. The engine was built by the DeLamater Iron Works of New York City. The propeller was 13' 6" in diameter. An indication that her designers considered her possible service in war, all her machinery was placed below her waterline, and thus less likely to be damaged by a cannonball. Under steam power alone, Ajax could achieve a maximum speed of 11.5 knots, but with a favorable wind and all sails set she could average 12.5 knots over the course of a day. She typically burned 18 tons of coal per day. Her coal bunkers held at least 10 days of fuel even with 2,000 tons of freight aboard.

In 1866, when she was purchased by the California Steam Navigation Company, she had over 60 first class cabins each with two berths. Several of these were converted to three-berth "family" staterooms. There were accommodations for several hundred steerage passengers as well. A salon 145 feet (44 m) long enclosed on the main deck forward provided space for passenger meals, walking, and entertainments. There were two smoking rooms. Shared bathrooms provided hot and cold running water. The galley was on the open top deck of the ship so that cooking odors would not enter the main cabin. Cooking for steerage passengers was apparently less elegant but quite efficient; food was cooked with steam from the ship's boilers. Separate dining facilities were provided for the ship's crew. There were four lifeboats and two other ship's boats.

== Civil war service ==
Ajax began her Civil War service with a trip from New York, leaving on January 15, 1865, carrying 80 bags of mail and papers, arriving in Savannah, Georgia on January 25. She was one of the first vessels to reach the city after the Savannah River was cleared of obstacles left by the retreating Confederates.

She left Hilton Head, South Carolina on March 7, 1865 and encountered heavy weather off Cape Hatteras. She arrived back in New York on March 10. Reports of her arrival noted she was "in ballast" indicating that there was no substantial cargo aboard. She embarked 1,000 troops and sailed for Beaufort, South Carolina on March 14, 1865.

She sailed from Moorehead City, North Carolina and arrived at Fortress Monroe on March 20, 1865.

On March 23, 1865 Ajax sailed up the Potomac River and anchored off Alexandria, Virginia. She had come from Wilmington, North Carolina with 60 passengers aboard. These were mostly armorers from the Fayetteville, North Carolina arsenal, who had relocated from Harpers Ferry, Virginia when the Confederate States moved the equipment they had captured. That night the ship was driven ashore on the mud banks opposite Alexandria in a gale.

On April 6, 1865 she arrived at Fortress Monroe from Moorehead City carrying a "large number" of Confederate prisoners and refugees from General Sherman's campaign.

On April 11, 1865 she arrived at Fortress Monroe from Wilmington. She sailed on to New York on April 12.

With General Lee's surrender at Appomattox on April 9, 1865, Ajax's Civil War service was over. With her government charter at an end, her owners sent her to California to seek a return on their investment. She sailed from New York for the last time on May 12, 1865. She stopped in Rio de Janeiro on June 22 and reached San Francisco on August 31, 1865. She was commanded by Captain Cornelius Godfrey in her late war service, her repositioning to the Pacific, and in her early commercial voyages from San Francisco.

== California Steam Navigation Company ==
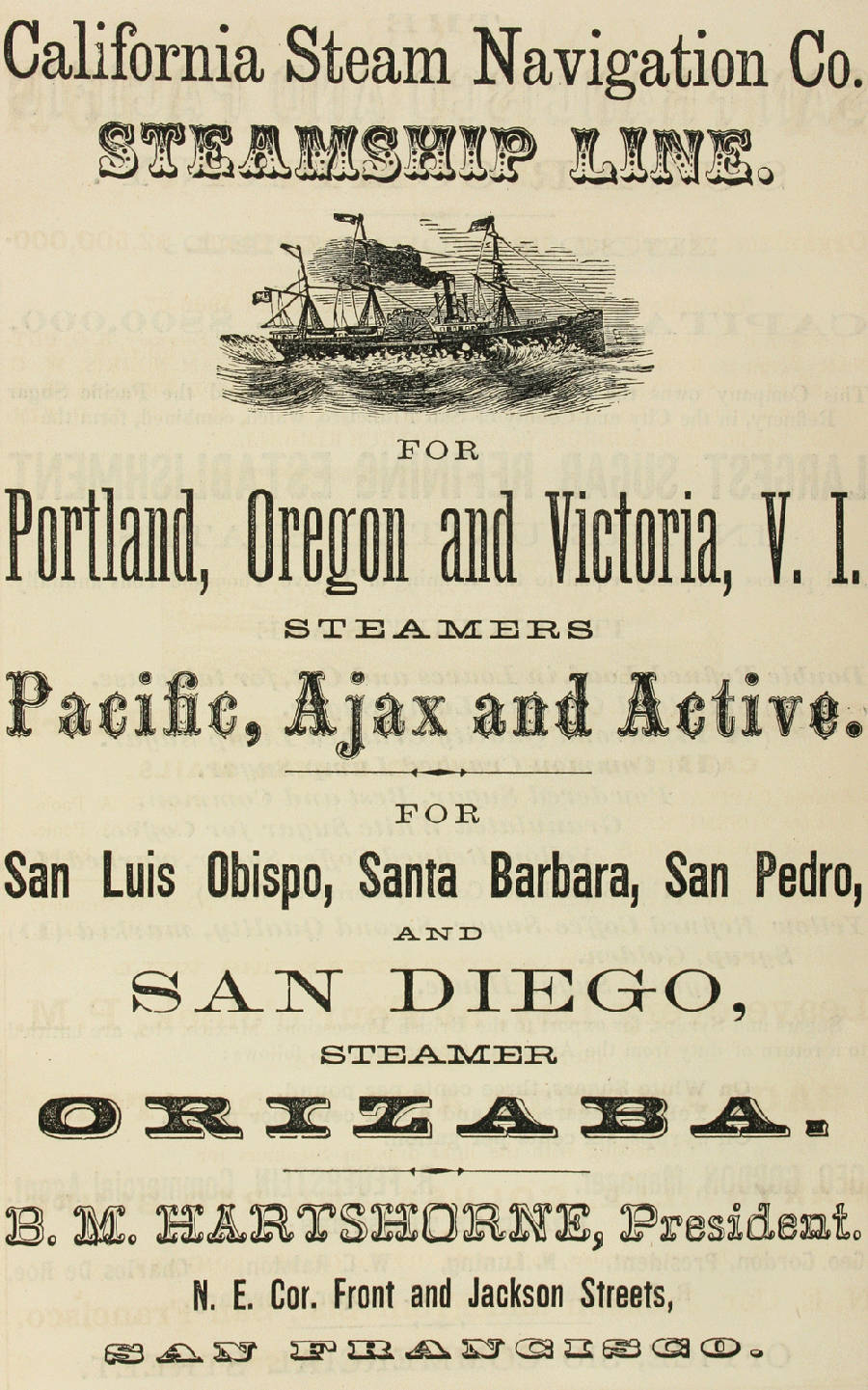
1867 newspaper advertisement for Ajax's Portland route

At some point prior to her arrival in San Francisco, Ajax was sold to the firm of Wakeman, Gookin & Dickinson, a New York City-based steamship company. She was advertised for sale on September 18, 1865, not three weeks since her arrival in San Francisco. On November 2, 1865, her owners held a sea trial for other steamship companies to examine her capabilities. Most vessels on the California coast at the time were paddlewheel steamers. There were few propeller driven ships and some skepticism about this new technology. Evidently the trial was a success. Later that month, the California Steam Navigation Company agreed to buy Ajax and California, another Wakeman, Gookin & Dickinson ship, for $250,000. Ajax was moved to Crowell's Wharf to begin a short refitting, for her new owners intended to use her to establish the first scheduled steamship service between San Francisco and Honolulu.

The fare for the inaugural eight-day trip from San Francisco to Honolulu was $75 for a cabin or $40 for steerage. She left San Francisco on January 13, 1866, under the command of Captain Godfrey. About a hundred passengers were onboard heading to Hawaii on health or pleasure tours. A crowd gathered at Cowell's wharf to see the ship sail off despite heavy rain and strong winds. A day into the voyage cabin passenger Joseph Greenwald died of consumption. Ajax arrived at Honolulu on January 27. She sailed back to San Francisco on February 10, 1866 arriving on February 22. She carried several passengers on this return voyage and a wide variety of agricultural imports including 2,579 kegs of sugar, 807 packages of molasses, 242 sacks of coffee, and 3,621 coconuts.

On March 7, 1866, Ajax sailed for Honolulu a second time. She cleared San Francisco with 1,786 sacks of flour, 87 sacks of barley, 57 sacks of oats, 498 sacks of potatoes, paint, guns, kegs of nails, a piano, 6 dozen shovels, and other merchandise valued at $28,192.75. One passenger on this second voyage was Samuel Clemens, who reported on the trip using his pen name, Mark Twain. Clemens was aboard Ajax as a special correspondent for the Sacramento Daily Union newspaper. In his first letter, he reported that the trip to Hawaii was rough, and claimed that he saw 22 passengers vomiting over the bulwarks from seasickness at one point. Clemens filed 25 letters with the paper, with the first three were written from the Ajax. Years later the letters were republished in a collection called "Letters From Hawaii," first published in book form in 1937 by Grabhorn Press.

On April 15, 1866, Ajax arrived back in San Francisco, with 617 tons of freight, a record for the time for a single ship from Hawaii. The ship's two trips were unprofitable, losing between $7,000 and $8,000. Shortly after her return to San Francisco, the California Steam Navigation Company withdrew he from her Hawaii route, ending scheduled steamship service to the islands. With the break in her scheduled sailings, she underwent a brief visit to the shipyard for repairs.

After several months of idleness, the ship was reassigned to the San Francisco - Portland route and made her first trip on February 12, 1867, arriving in Portland on February 16. She made several additional roundtrips between San Francisco and Portland in 1867, but with competition from the Ben Holladay's California, Oregon & Mexico Steamship Company and the newly launched Anchor Line, the route had too many ships on it and a full scale fare war broke out. Fares dropped from $45 for a cabin and $25 for steerage to $10 and $3 respectively between 1866 and 1867. Unable to make money on its ocean-going shipping business, the California Steam Navigation Company sold its entire fleet of seagoing vessels, including Ajax, to the California, Oregon & Mexico Steamship company in mid-1867.

== North Pacific Transportation Company ==
Ajax continued her trips to Portland in 1868,1869, and early 1870 with occasional trips to Victoria and Mazatlan. In March 1869 the California, Oregon, and Mexico Steamship Company was reincorporated under the laws of California as the North Pacific Transportation Company. On May 10, 1870 Ajax sailed again for Honolulu, this time to meet the steamer City of Melbourne sailing from Australia and New Zealand. Passengers booked through tickets going in both directions. She sailed with $36,202 of freight. This was the first of four roundtrips to Hawaii in 1870. The company suspended this transpacific service during the stormy winter months, reassigning the ship to the San Francisco - Portland route. She resumed her trips to Honolulu on March 18, 1871, carrying 33 passengers, more than half of whom were transferring there to a steamer that would take them to Australia or New Zealand. She was reassigned to her Portland route again for the winter of 1871 and remained on this route for the remainder of her career.

== Oregon Steamship Company ==
Sometime in early 1872, Ben Holladay placed the steamers Ajax, J. L. Stephens, and Oriflamme in a new corporation, the Oregon Steamship Company. This new company served only the San Francisco to Portland route and thus buttressed Holladay's riverboat and railroad business in Oregon. He subsequently sold the rest of the North Pacific Transportation Company fleet to the Pacific Mail Steamship Company.

January 1872 found Ajax fulfilling her original role in supporting Army logistics. She transported three companies of infantry from Portland south on their way to support fighting with Native Americans in Arizona. She returned three companies of the 21st US Infantry to Portland in September, 1872.

The difficulties of the San Francisco - Portland route combined with the Ajax's advancing age brought a cascade of mechanical problems. She grounded in the Willamette River in October 1871, and on the Columbia River bar in March 1875. She lost her rudder and had to have her rudder shoe repaired in a shipyard. The rod on her massive piston broke in April, 1874. She had difficulty with her propeller shaft in January 1876 and lost a blade on her massive propeller in November 1876. With this breakdown, she had sailed her last.

== Obsolescence ==
After months of idleness, Ajax was sold to John Roach in March 1878. Roach owned a Chester, Pennsylvania shipyard with business ties to the Oregon Steamship Company. He does not appear to have done much with Ajax; she was "laid up" and idle in May 1878. She was towed up Oakland Creek where she was laid up permanently in October 1880. In November 1880 she was purchased by Charles Goodall, a partner in the Pacific Coast Steamship Company, one of the significant shipping firms based in San Francisco. His plan was to remove her machinery and convert her into a sailing ship for the transport of coal. There is no evidence that this ever occurred. Ajax drops out of newspaper accounts and US Government ship records after 1880, suggesting that she was either broken up, or pursued her new trade as a collier in another country.
