= USS Floridian =

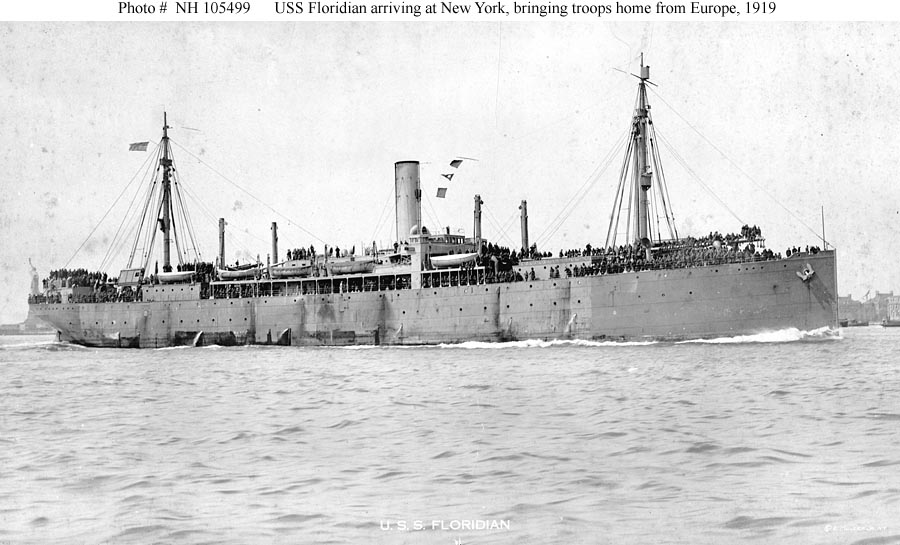
- USS Floridian arriving at New York City from France in 1919 with her decks crowded with American troops returning to the United States after serving in World War I. The Statue of Liberty is in the distance at left.

History

United States
- Name: USS Floridian
- Namesake: Previous name retained
- Builder: Maryland Steel Company, Baltimore, Maryland
- Launched: 16 October 1915
- Completed: 1915
- Acquired: 28 January 1919
- Commissioned: 28 January 1919
- Decommissioned: 4 August 1919
- Fate: Sank following collision 1 September 1928
- Notes: In commercial service as SS Floridian 1915–1919 and from 1919–1928

General characteristics
- Type: Troop transport
- Tonnage: 6,930 gross register tons
- Displacement: 14,500 tons
- Length: 429 ft 2 in (130.81 m)
- Beam: 53 ft 8 in (16.36 m)
- Draft: 29 ft 6 in (8.99 m)
- Propulsion: Steam engine
- Speed: 14 knots
- Armament: 1 × 6-inch (152-millimeter) gun; 1 × 3-inch (76.2-millimeter) gun

USS Floridian (ID-3875) was a United States Navy troop transport in commission in 1919.

SS Floridian was built as a commercial cargo ship in 1915 at Baltimore, Maryland, by the Maryland Steel Company for the American-Hawaiian Steamship Company of New York City. After the United States entered World War I in 1917, Floridian came under the control of the United States Shipping Board. Converted to a troop transport, she spent the rest of the war operating under a United States Army charter. The U.S. Navy acquired Floridian from the Shipping Board on 28 January 1919, assigned her the naval registry Identification Number (Id. No.) 3875, and commissioned her on the same day as USS Floridian.

Floridian was assigned to the Cruiser and Transport Force and designated to carry U.S. Army passengers and cargo. She departed New York City on 16 March 1919 for St. Nazaire, France, where she arrived on 28 March 1919 with supplies for the Army of Occupation.

She made three trips carrying U. S. Army troops to the United States in 1919, all from St. Nazaire. On 14 April, Floridian was one of seven transports to arrive at Hoboken, New Jersey carrying 10,000 troops. She carried 1,824 men including as described by the Seattle Times, "Headquarters and Medical Detachments and Companies A and B of 346th Machine Gun Battalion; 3rd Battalion Headquarters, Medical and Ordnance Detachments, Supply Company and Companies H, I, K, L and M of the 362nd Infantry; 620th Casual Company."

The second trip arrived in Hoboken on 14 June. This brought 1,791 troops home. Units aboard included, as described by the Seattle Times, 435 "men of the 148th Field Artillery, 41st Division... [with] Field and Staff, Medical Detachments, Headquarters Company and Battery E. Other troops on board were the 509th Engineers, Headquarters and Medical Detachments and Companies A to D inclusive; members of the 369th Service Park Unit."

The final load of returning soldiers arrived in Hoboken on 16 July. The 1,829 men aboard included, per the Seattle Times, "... the 337th Field Remount Squadron and casuals for Camps Dodge and Bowie."

After these voyages, Floridian was assigned to the 3rd Naval District on 16 July 1919. She was decommissioned and returned to the American-Hawaiian Steamship Company on 4 August 1919. She then resumed service as the commercial cargo ship SS Floridian. At about 10:30 p.m. on 1 September 1928 Floridian and the American steamer Admiral Fiske collided off Cape Flattery, Washington, south of Umatilla lightship, then LV 67, with Floridian sinking and Admiral Fiske heavily damaged.
