= The Floridian =

The Floridian may refer to:

== Hotels ==
- Disney's Grand Floridian Resort & Spa, a hotel on International Drive, Orlando, Florida
- The Floridian (Hong Kong), a residential building in Quarry Bay, Hong Kong
- Floridian Hotel, a hotel in Miami, Florida

== Newspapers ==
- The Floridian, former newspaper in Pensacola, Florida
- The Floridian, also the Weekly Floridian, former newspaper in Tallahassee from 1828 (List of newspapers in Florida)
- The Floridian, originally the Jewish Floridian in Miami established 1927 (List of newspapers in Florida)
- The Floridian, a Florida statewide news website based in Fort Lauderdale with website at floridianpress.com

== Transportation ==
- Floridian (train, 1971–1979), a former intercity train between Chicago and Miami
- Floridian (train), an intercity train between Chicago and Miami
