= Orizaba (1854 ship) =

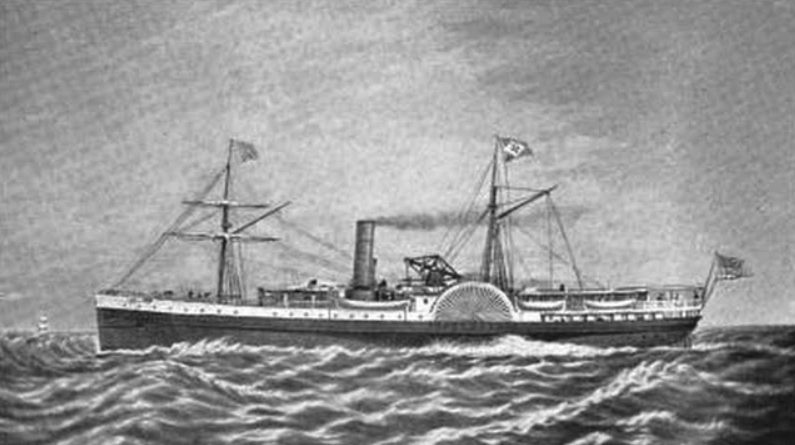
- Orizaba flying the Pacific Coast Steamship Company flag

History

United States
- Name: Orizaba
- Builder: Jacob A. Westervelt & Company
- Cost: $240,000
- Launched: January 14, 1854
- Homeport: San Francisco
- Identification: Signal letters H.W.M.T.
- Fate: Broken up in San Francisco, June 1887

General characteristics
- Class & type: Sidewheel Steamship
- Tonnage: 1,244 GRT
- Tons burthen: 1600 tons
- Length: 240 ft (73 m)
- Beam: 34 ft (10 m)
- Draft: 15.4 ft (4.7 m)
- Depth: 17 ft (5.2 m)
- Installed power: 500 horsepower
- Sail plan: Brigantine
- Speed: 13.5 knots
- Capacity: 786 Passengers, 1450 tons of freight
- Notes: Official number 19148

Orizaba was one of the first ocean-going steamships in commercial service on the west coast of North America and one of the last side-wheelers in regular use. Her colorful career spanned the business intrigues of Cornelius Vanderbilt, civil unrest in Mexico and Nicaragua, and the Fraser River gold rush. The ship was particularly important to Southern California ports, where she called for roughly the last 20 years of her service.

== Construction ==
Orizaba was built by Jacob A. Westervelt and Company at its shipyard in New York City. She was 240' (73 m) long, with a beam of 34' (10 m) and a draft of 15.4' (5.2 m). The ship measured 1,244 gross register tons. She was a 2-deck wooden sidewheel steamship. Her frames were made from oak and her planking from chestnut. Her vertical beam steam engine was coal fired. This engine was manufactured at the Morgan Iron Works at the foot of 10th Street on the East River in Manhattan. The engine had a single cylinder 65" (1.7 m) in diameter with an 11' (3.4 m) stroke. Her paddle wheels were 32' (9.8 m) in diameter. She had two masts, rigged as a brigantine, and could sail. Orizaba was launched on January 14, 1854.

The inspiration for the ship's name is lost to history, but it seems probable that it is connected to the highest mountain in Mexico, Pico de Orizaba, or the nearby town of Orizaba. Both are near Veracruz, one of the ship's first regular destinations.

== Harris & Morgan Line (1854–1856) ==
Charles Morgan commissioned Orizaba as part of his fleet of steamships. The ship's business was managed by a partnership formed by his son-in-law and his youngest son, Israel Harris and Henry Morgan. Orizaba's inaugural trip was from New York to New Orleans. She departed on April 22, 1854. Passengers were charged $60 for a cabin and $25 for a steerage berth to New Orleans, and freight cost 30 cents per cubic foot. For the next year and a half, the ship shuttled between New Orleans and Veracruz, completing two round-trips per month. There was substantial political unrest in Mexico at the time, and even armed rebellion against the government aided by guns shipped from supporters in New Orleans. While there is no evidence that Orizaba carried weapons, she did bring back to the United States the first news of many events in the uprising. Orizaba ended her New Orleans - Veracruz service in early 1856. She returned to New York from New Orleans on February 10, 1856 to begin her new assignment.

== Nicaragua Steamship Company (1856–1858) ==
The California gold rush resulted in large demand for travel to California. The only existing sea route from the East Coast to California was through Panama. It was an effective monopoly with the U.S. Mail Steamship Company running to the Atlantic side of the isthmus, and the Pacific Mail Steamship Company running from Panama to San Francisco. The monopoly kept rates high, so Cornelius Vanderbilt pioneered a new route from New York to San Francisco across Nicaragua, at least 500 miles shorter than the route across Panama. His ocean-going steamships sailed from New York to the Caribbean coast of Nicaragua, and from the Pacific Coast to San Francisco. He planned a canal to connect the two oceans, but in the short-term transferred passengers from one coast to the other by shallow-draft river steamer, stagecoach, and mule train. The Nicaraguan government granted the Accessory Transit Company, controlled by Vanderbilt, the right to build a canal and pending its construction, a monopoly on transporting passengers across the country. Charles Morgan was the company's New York manager. The business, if not the canal was a success, and in one year 24,000 passengers traveled the route.

Unfortunately for Vanderbilt, Nicaragua was politically unstable, and some of his partners, including Morgan and Cornelius K. Garrison, sought control of the Nicaragua route. One Nicaraguan faction invited American William Walker to form a private army to tip the scales toward its cause. In 1855 he arrived in country with 57 other Americans and was quickly successful in seizing large swathes of the country. Walker annulled the Accessory Transport Company grant and seized its property. With the land crossing lost to him, Vanderbilt withdrew his ocean steamers from the Nicaragua route in March 1885. Morgan stepped in, aligning with Walker to gain passage through the country. Orizaba began sailing between New York and Nicaragua, taking the place of Vanderbilt's ships. She sailed from New York with 500 passengers aboard for Greytown, Nicaragua on April 8, 1856. Her departure was delayed by U.S. Marshalls who arrested three of her passengers for attempting to join Walker's forces in violation of neutrality laws.

The mix of competing New York capitalists and competing Nicaraguan political factions created a full-scale war in Nicaragua and Orizaba sailed into it. She arrived in Greytown on April 16, 1856. By this time Costa Rican troops had invaded Nicaragua, likely urged on and perhaps funded by Vanderbilt, to suppress Walker and close the transit route across the country that supplied him. Complicating matters further, the Royal Navy ship HMS Eurydyice forbade Orizaba to land her passengers, at least some of whom were likely there to join Walker's army. The British regarded Walker's ascendence and the flood of Americans coming to Nicaragua to support him as a potential violation of the Clayton-Bulwer Treaty. Also, Vanderbilt's agents, sent to retake his property by force, asked for British help in blocking the landing of Orizaba's passengers. Whatever the motivation, British interference with the U.S.-flagged Orizaba stoked nationalist feelings in America. She arrived back in New York on April 29, 1856.

Orizaba made two more trips between New York and Greytown, arriving back in New York for the final time on July 15, 1856. She was then reassigned to the Pacific leg of the route, from San Juan del Sur, Nicaragua to San Francisco. She sailed from New York to take up her new post on August 6, 1856. She reached San Juan del Sur, Nicaragua on October 8, 1856 via the Strait of Magellan, after several stops for coal, water, and provisions. She reached San Francisco for the first time on October 30, 1856.

Orizaba began sailing from San Francisco to Nicaragua. Given the chaos on the transit route, passengers were assured that if it were blocked across Nicaragua, Orizaba would carry them to Panama, from whence a ship on the Caribbean coast would take them on to New York. Indeed, the ship did end up sailing on to Panama to transfer passengers to and from ships in the Atlantic.

Morgan and Garrison supported Walker in order to gain control of the transit route, shipping arms and men to Walker's army on Orizaba. The ship stoked the continuing unrest, and became a victim of it when one of her boats was fired upon in April, 1857. She arrived back in San Francisco on April 20, 1857, by which time forces opposed to Walker had retaken the transit route and closed it. Orizaba was idled, anchored in San Francisco Bay.

== New York and California Steamship Company (1858–1860) ==
Cornelius Vanderbilt was not done with the coast-to-coast trade. He reconciled with his estranged partner from the Nicaraguan trade, Cornelius K. Garrison, to form a competitive line between San Francisco and Panama. (He ultimately bought Garrison's interest, so perhaps the reconciliation was not complete.) The New York and California Steamship Company began service in March 1858 with Northern Lights sailing the New York - Panama leg. Orizaba sailed from San Francisco for Panama on March 5, 1858. The strategy of the company was to pressure the incumbent monopolist on the route, the Pacific Mail Steamship Company.

The Fraser River gold rush began in April, 1858, so upon her return to San Francisco, Orizaba and every other seaworthy vessel in San Francisco fitted out for service north. She sailed for Victoria, BC on July 1, 1858, transporting 786 passengers and 1,450 tons of freight to the new mines. After this one trip at the height of the rush, Orizaba was idled again.

Meanwhile, the Panama strategy had worked. Having proved that he could compete on the Panama route, Vanderbilt struck a deal with the Pacific Mail Steamship Company whereby it would pay him $40,000 a month not to. Vanderbilt thought he could get more, so he restarted competitive service to Panama in early 1859. On March 5, 1859 Orizaba sailed to Panama with 725 passengers aboard. She returned on April 6, 1859 and this time she kept sailing. The Vanderbilt ships undercut the Pacific Mail Steamship Company's rates and took business away from it. Through a complicated series of transactions involving ships in both oceans, Vanderbilt sold his San Francisco-Panama business. including Orizaba, to the Pacific Mail Steamship Company for a combination of stock and cash, in June 1860.

Orizaba was owned by the P.M.S.S. Co. twice

== Pacific Mail Steamship Company (1860–1865) ==
Orizaba continued her service between San Francisco and Panama for her new owner. She saw some extraordinary cargos, including $1,006,018 in silver and gold that was shipped from San Francisco on October 21, 1861. She drops out of newspaper accounts in April 1864, suggesting that she had been idled prior to her sale to the California Steam Navigation Company.

== California Steam Navigation Company (1865–1867) ==
The mid-1850s saw the economy of the West Coast grow. This new demand convinced the California Steam Navigation Company to establish routes from its San Francisco base to ports along the West Coast. The company used a few of its largest steamers for these new routes and acquired other ocean-going ships to meet this demand. Orizaba was purchased by the California Steam Navigation Company from the Pacific Mail Steamship Company in 1865 for $60,000. She immediately began service between San Francisco and Portland. The ship also served the San Francisco to San Pedro route beginning in 1866.

These new routes created growing competition with the California, Oregon, and Mexico Steamship Company run by Ben Holladay. When a third steamship company, the Anchor Line, entered the Portland - San Francisco market, prices fell so low that they triggered industry consolidation. The entire ocean-going fleet of the California Steam Navigation, including Orizaba, and the Anchor Line were merged into the California, Oregon, and Mexico Steamship Company in 1867.

== North Pacific Transportation Company (1867–1872) ==
Orizaba continued to run between Southern California and San Francisco under her new ownership. Her cargo from the south was primarily agricultural commodities. A February 1868 shipment included 100,000 oranges, several thousand lemons and limes, 119 casks of whale oil, and 15,750 gallons of wine. In March 1869, the California, Oregon and Mexico Steamship Company was reorganized as the North Pacific Transportation Company. The company changed from a New York corporation with headquarters in New York City to a California corporation with headquarters in San Francisco. In September 1872 Ben Holladay sold the North Pacific Transportation Company and all of its ships, including Orizaba, to the Pacific Mail Steamship Company.

== Pacific Mail Steamship Company (1872–1875) ==
The company paid $150,000 to purchase Orizaba. Orizaba ran as part of Pacific Mail Steamship Company's south coast line, from San Francisco to San Diego, with stops in Santa Barbara, and San Pedro. In 1874 she had the distinction of setting a new single-ship freight record between San Francisco and San Pedro of 575 tons. Competition among steamboat operators drove rates on this route to unsustainable levels, forcing further industry consolidation. Pacific Mail Steamship Company exited the coastal shipping business and focused on its longer international routes. Five ships, including Orizaba, and all the facilities of the south coast line was sold to Goodall, Nelson, and Perkins steamship company.

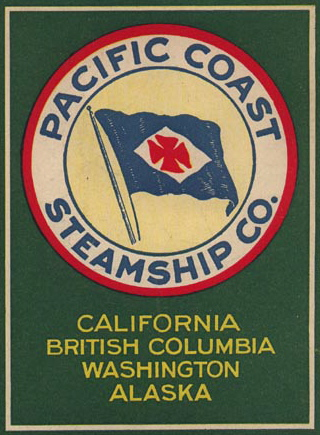

== Pacific Coast Steamship Company (1875–1887) ==
In January 1875, Goodall, Nelson, and Perkins Steamship Company purchased five ships from the Pacific Mail Steamship Company, including Orizaba. She began her work for her new owner by continuing her runs between San Francisco and San Diego. She retained not only her old routing, but her previous captain as well. Captain Henry James Johnston commanded the ship for thirteen years encompassing her time with the Pacific Mail Steamship Company and part of her time with the Pacific Coast Steamship Company. She docked at Stearns' Wharf on her Santa Barbara port calls and Culverwell's Wharf at San Diego.

When partner Chris Nelson retired in October 1876, Goodall, Nelson, and Perkins Steamship Company was reorganized as the Pacific Coast Steamship Company.

In July 1877, Orizaba was switched to the San Francisco to Portland route, but was switched back to her old San Francisco to San Diego routing in November 1877. By 1881 her old technology left her slower than more modern propeller-driven ships so she was refit with new boilers and new paddlewheels, increasing her speed to 13.5 knots. The ship suffered several broken paddlewheel shafts after this upgrade. Oriziba was always repaired, and continued her sailings along the south coast. Her last trip from San Diego to San Francisco took place in January 1887.

== Orizaba obsolete ==
In January 1887, the ship was laid up for repairs, and another old side-wheeler, Ancon, replaced her on the San Francisco - San Diego route. An inspection required costly repairs that were deemed too expensive for a ship of her advanced years and old technology. Orizaba was broken up at the Broadway Street Wharf in San Francisco in June and July 1887. Some of her ironwork was so stout that workmen used dynamite to try to break it apart. The workmen thought the explosion was wonderfully effective, but with shards of iron landing up to 300 yards away, they were prevailed upon to go back to using hammers.
