= Ornidia aemula =

Scientific classification
- Kingdom: Animalia
- Phylum: Arthropoda
- Class: Insecta
- Order: Diptera
- Family: Syrphidae
- Subfamily: Eristalinae
- Tribe: Volucellini
- Genus: Ornidia
- Species: O. aemula

Binomial name
- Ornidia aemula (Williston, 1888)

Synonyms
- Volucella aemula Williston, 1888

Species of fly

Ornidia aemula is a species of Hoverfly in the family Syrphidae.

== Distribution ==
Venezuela, Bolivia, Colombia, Brazil.
