= Ornidia major =

Scientific classification
- Kingdom: Animalia
- Phylum: Arthropoda
- Class: Insecta
- Order: Diptera
- Family: Syrphidae
- Subfamily: Eristalinae
- Tribe: Volucellini
- Genus: Ornidia
- Species: O. major

Binomial name
- Ornidia major Curran, 1930

Synonyms
- Volucella violacea Macquart, 1842

Species of fly

Ornidia major is a species of Hoverfly in the family Syrphidae.

== Distribution ==
It is found in Costa Rica, Panama, Ecuador, and Peru.
