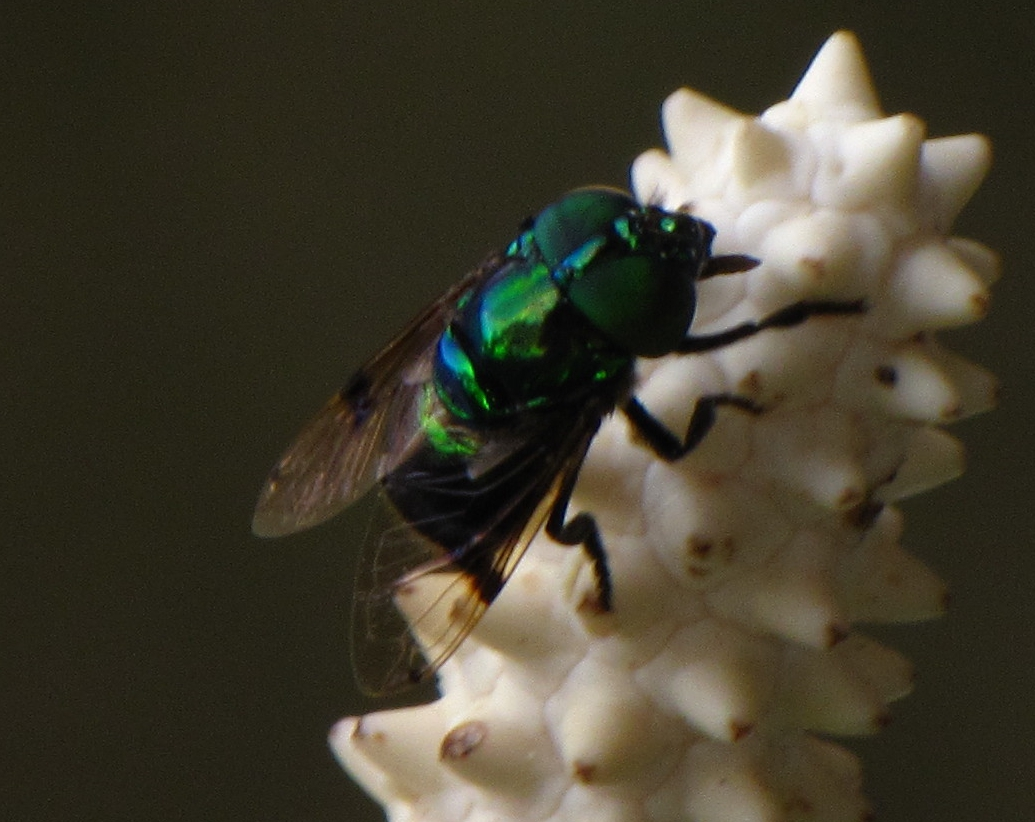
- Ornidia

Scientific classification
- Kingdom: Animalia
- Phylum: Arthropoda
- Class: Insecta
- Order: Diptera
- Family: Syrphidae
- Subfamily: Eristalinae
- Tribe: Volucellini
- Genus: Ornidia; Lepeletier & Serville, 1828

Type species
- Syrphus obesus Fabricius, 1775

= Ornidia =

Genus of flies

Ornidia is a small genus of mid-sized metallic hoverflies.

All are endemic to the New World. With Ornidia obesa, which is widespread in the Americas, having spread into the Pacific and across the Orient and to the east coast of Africa aided by human activity.

== Species ==
- Ornidia aemula (Williston, 1888)
- Ornidia major Curran, 1930
- Ornidia obesa (Fabricius, 1775)
- Ornidia therezinhae Carvalho Filho & Esposito, 2009
- Ornidia whiteheadi Thompson, 1991
