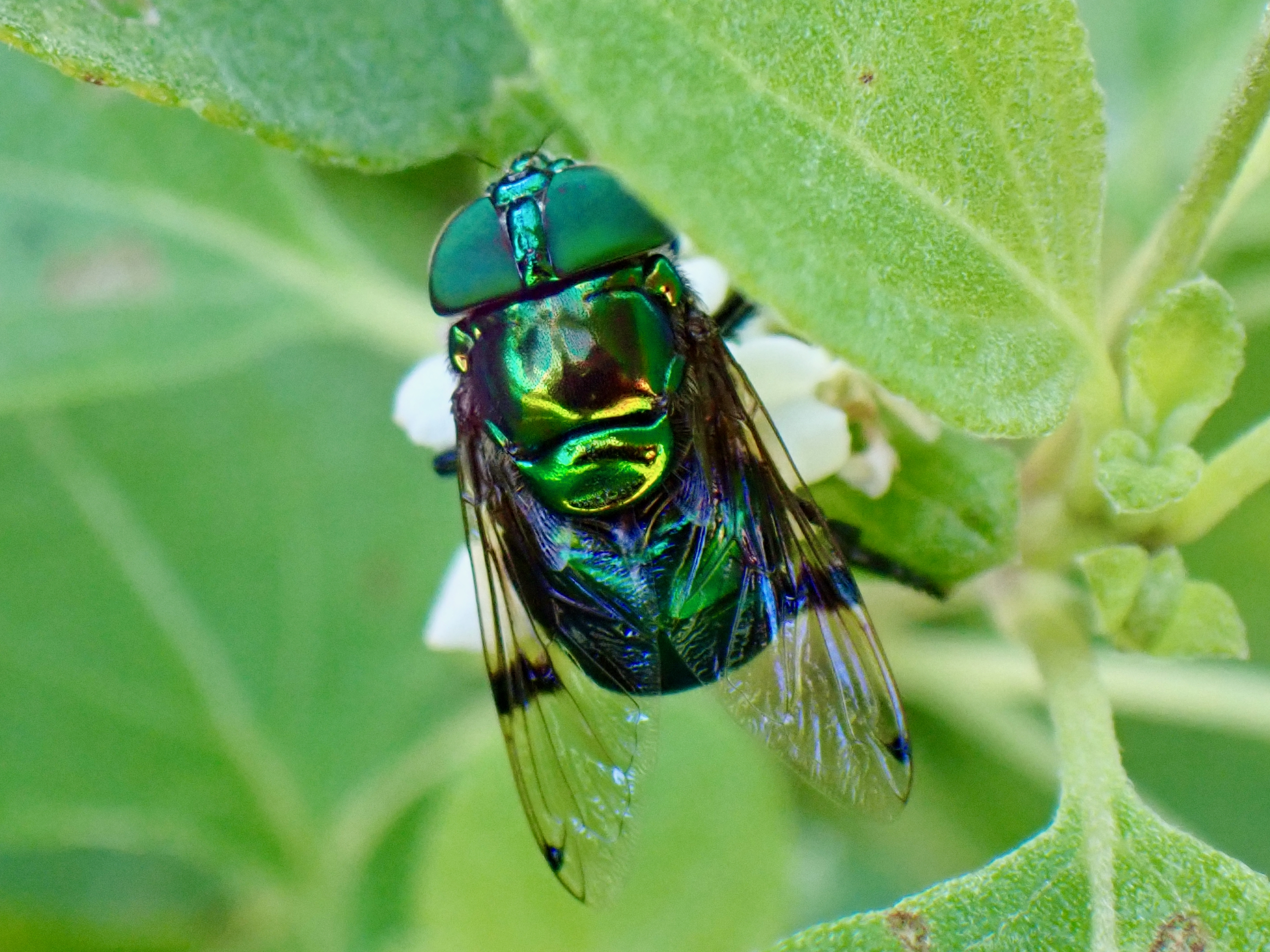
- Ornidia obesa observed on Great Harbour Cay, Berry Islands, The Bahamas

Scientific classification
- Kingdom: Animalia
- Phylum: Arthropoda
- Clade: Pancrustacea
- Class: Insecta
- Order: Diptera
- Family: Syrphidae
- Tribe: Volucellini
- Genus: Ornidia
- Species: O. obesa

Binomial name
- Ornidia obesa (Fabricius, 1775)

Synonyms
- Syrphus obesa' Fabricius, 1775; Musca nero Curtiss, 1938; Volucella obesoides Giglio-Tos, 1892

= Ornidia obesa =

Species of fly

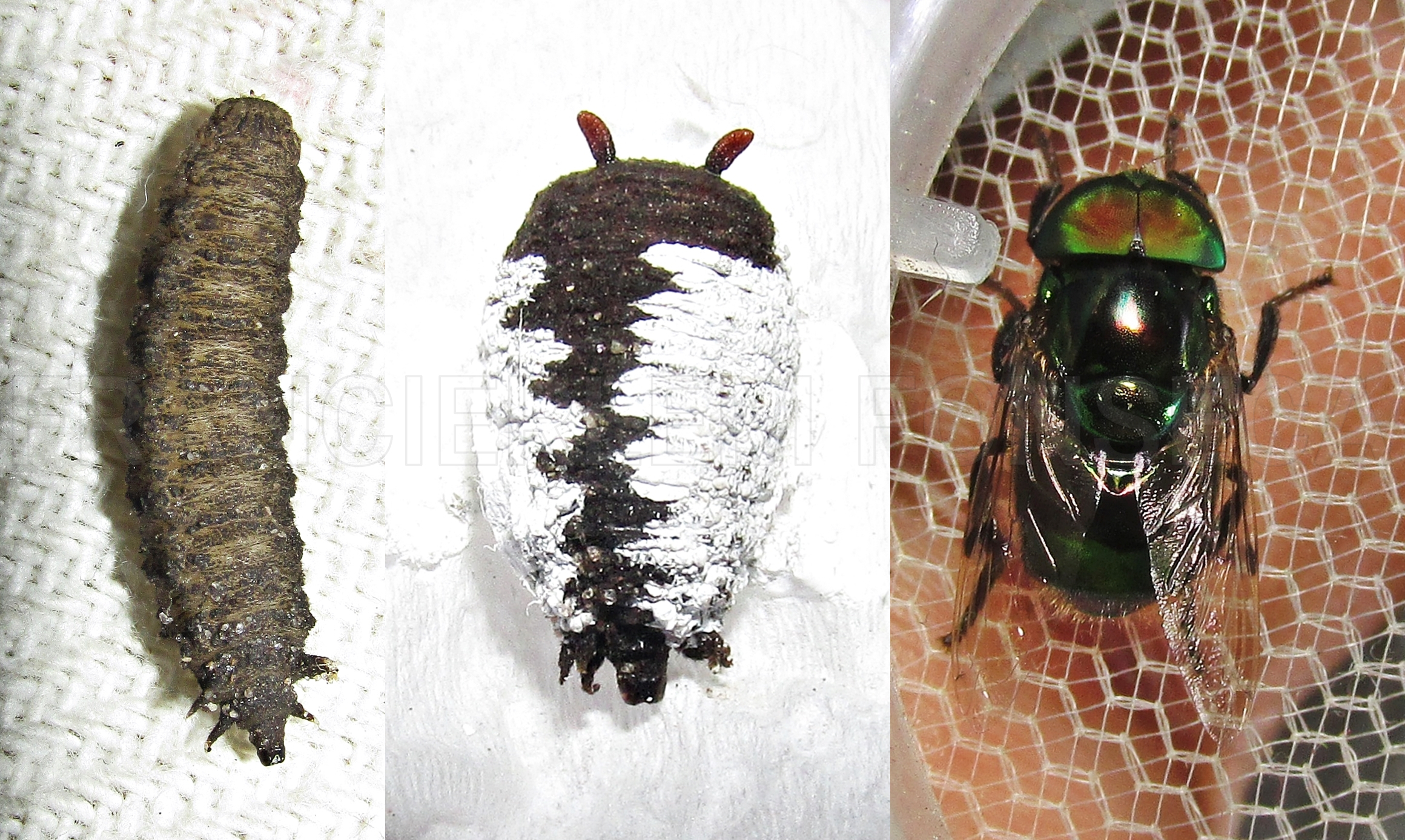
Larvae, pupae, and adult of Ornidia obesa

Ornidia obesa is a species of syrphid fly in the family Syrphidae.
