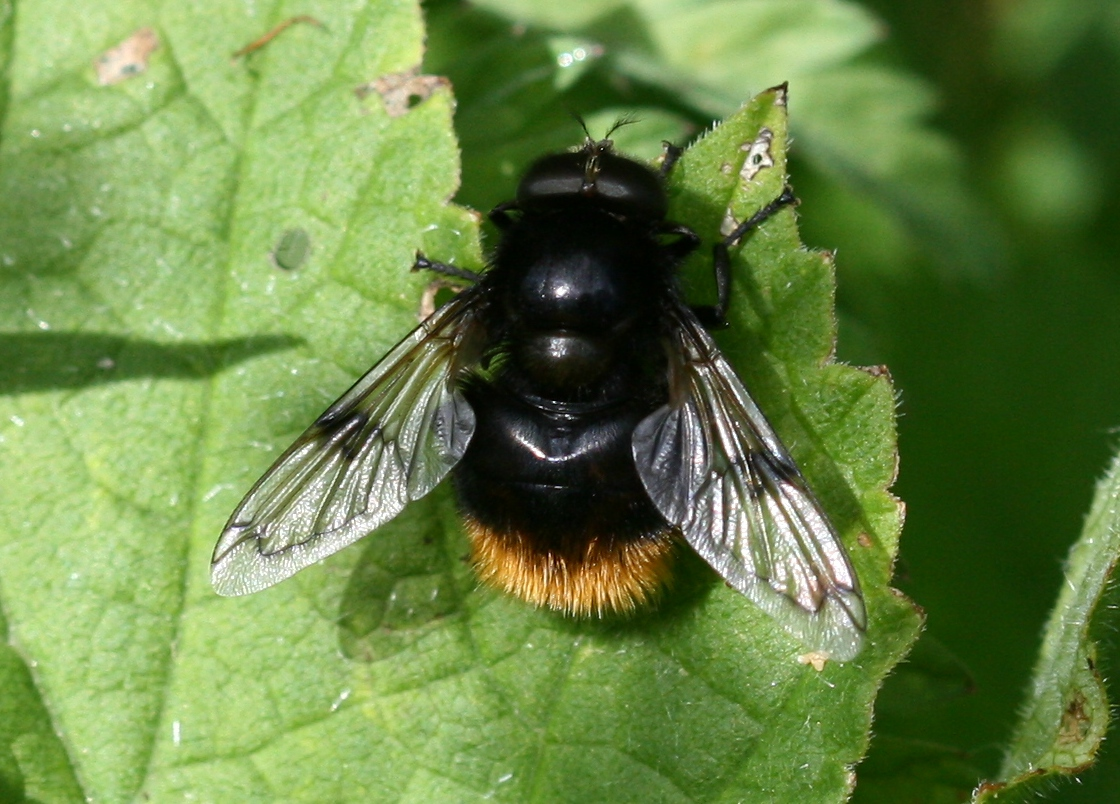
- Volucella bombylans var. bombylans, male
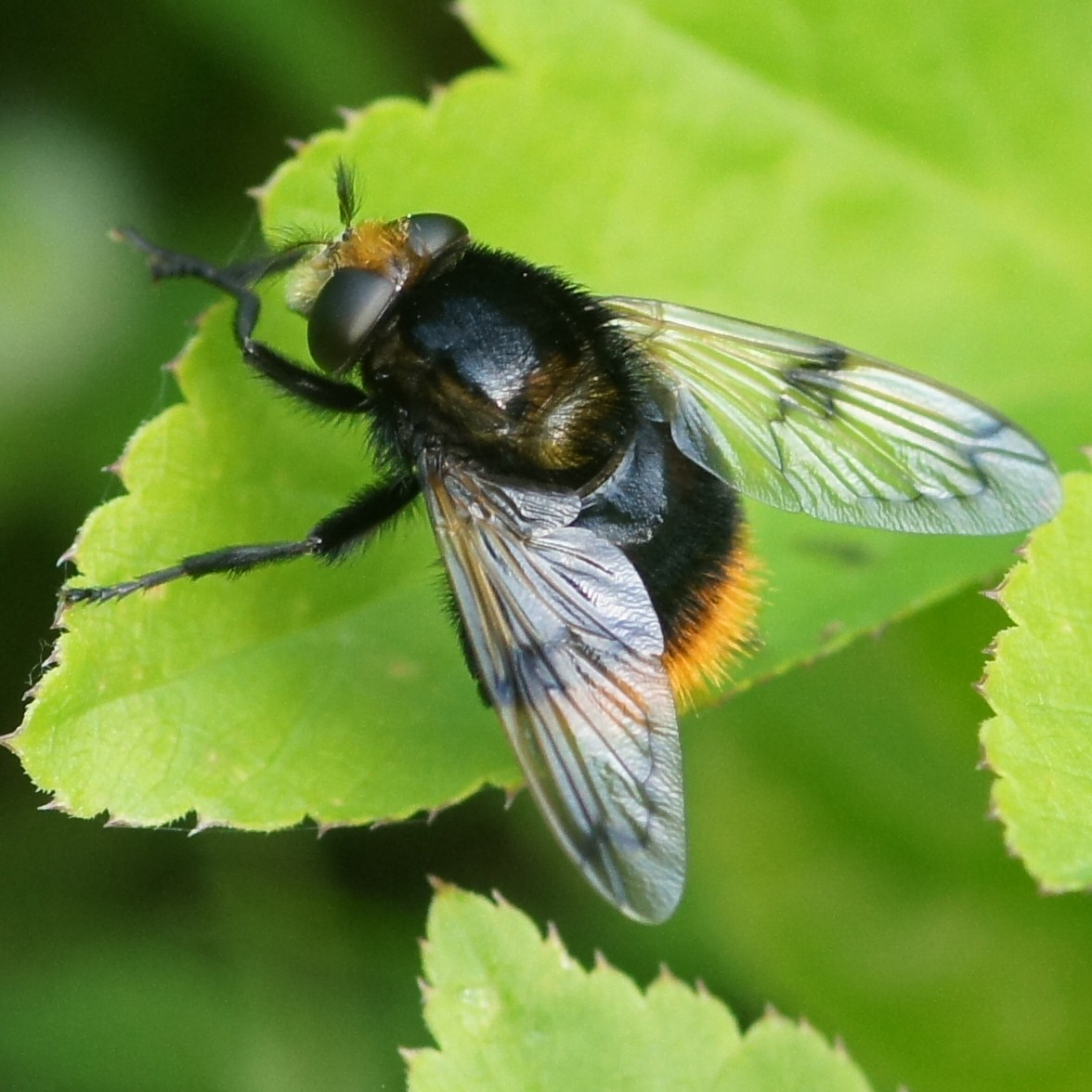
- Volucella bombylans var. bombylans, female

Scientific classification
- Kingdom: Animalia
- Phylum: Arthropoda
- Class: Insecta
- Order: Diptera
- Family: Syrphidae
- Subfamily: Eristalinae
- Tribe: Volucellini
- Genus: Volucella
- Species: V. bombylans

Binomial name
- Volucella bombylans (Linnaeus, 1758)

Synonyms
- Musca bombylans Linnaeus, 1758; Musca plumata De Geer, 1776; Volucella basalis Say, 1835; Volucella rufomaculata Jones, 1917

= Volucella bombylans =

Species of fly

Volucella bombylans is a large species of hoverfly belonging to the family Syrphidae.

== Distribution ==
This species is present in most of Europe, in the East Palearctic realm, in the Near East and in the Nearctic realm.

== Habitat ==
These hoverflies can be found in forest edges and clearings, woodland margins, hedgerows, wet meadows, spruce forest edge and urban wasteland or gardens, usually sunning on leaves.

== Description ==
Volucella bombylans is larger than most hoverflies, reaching a body length of 11 to 17 mm. and a wingspan length of 8–14 mm. They look something like a bumblebee with a furry black, yellow and/or white body, but they are given away by their heads, plumed antennae, large eyes and the particular wing venation, which make them quite easy to identify as a true fly, like a blowfly.

The mesonotum bears black or yellow hairs on the sides, while the scutellum is brownish or yellowish. The wings are milky white with a dark cross-bands in the anterior half and a diffuse dark spot at the wing tip. The abdomen is yellow at the base and black in the middle, with long, dense hairs at the end. The legs are rather short and black.

This species occurs in several forms, each of which mimics a species of bumblebee (Batesian mimicry). The two main varieties are Volucella bombylans var. bombylans, showing an orange-red tail, mimicking the Red-tailed Bumblebee (Bombus lapidarius) and Volucella bombylans var. plumata with a white tail, mimicking the White-tailed Bumble Bee (Bombus lucorum) and the Buff-tailed Bumblebee (Bombus terrestris).

Volucella bombylans var. plumata is also rather similar to other syrphids (Arctophila bombiformis and Merodon equestris.

== Biology ==
V. bombylans has two generations and can be encountered from May until September, with a peak in June. These hoverfies are fast fliers. The adults feed on nectar and pollen (mainly on Valeriana officinalis, Geranium sylvaticum, Centaurea jacea, Cirsium palustre, Epilobium angustifolium, etc.), with preference for blue flowers.

The females of these hoverflies lay their eggs in the nests of social wasps or bumblebees, where the larvae live as scavengers, feeding on debris and occasionally on host's larvae.

== Gallery ==
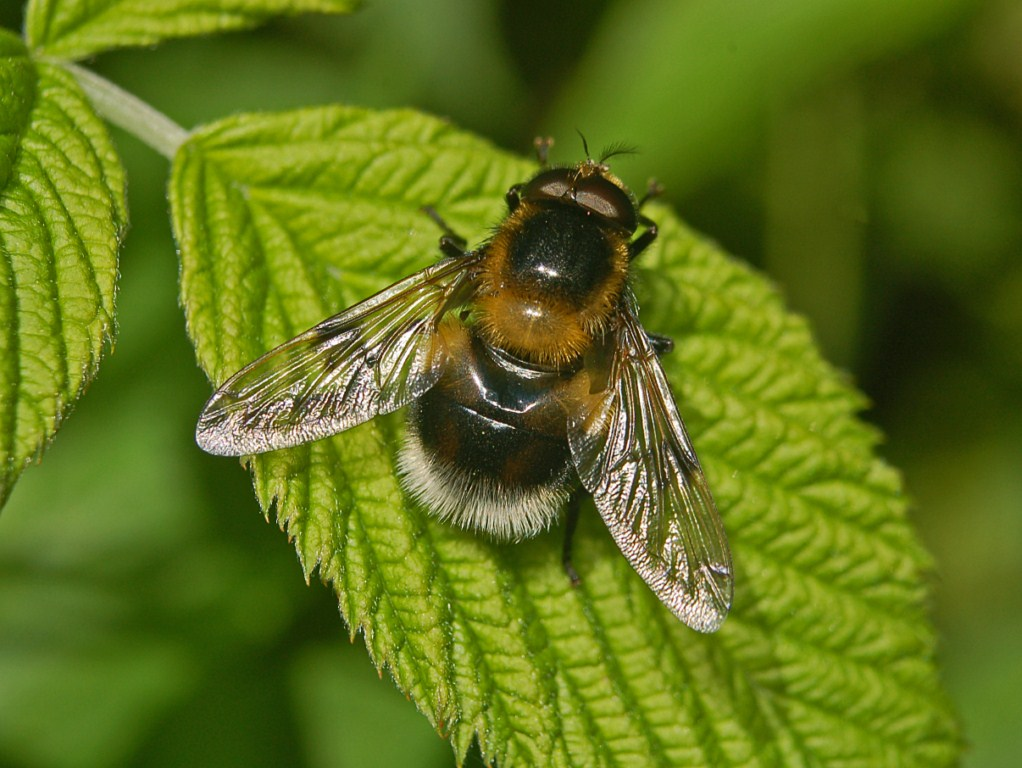
Volucella bombylans var. plumata, male

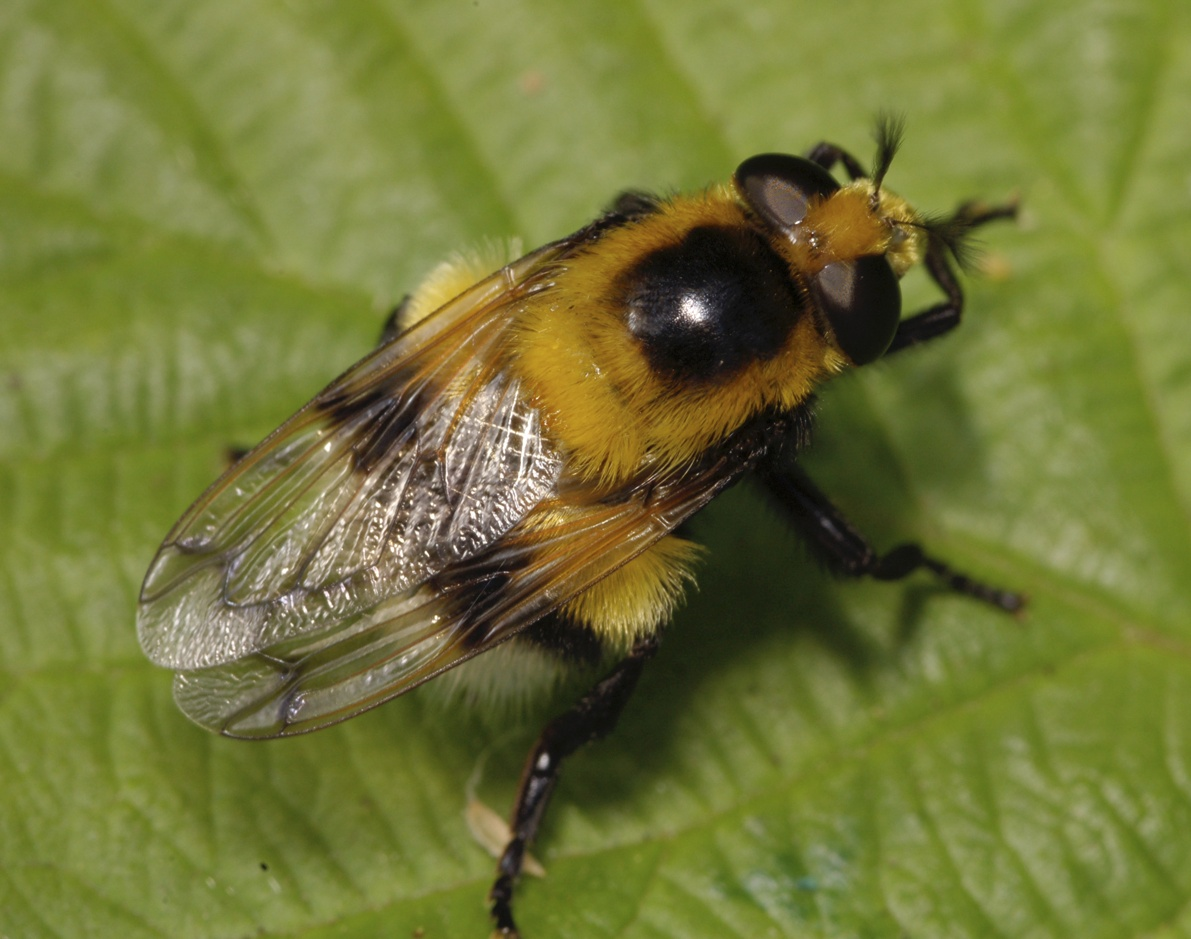
Volucella bombylans var. plumata, female

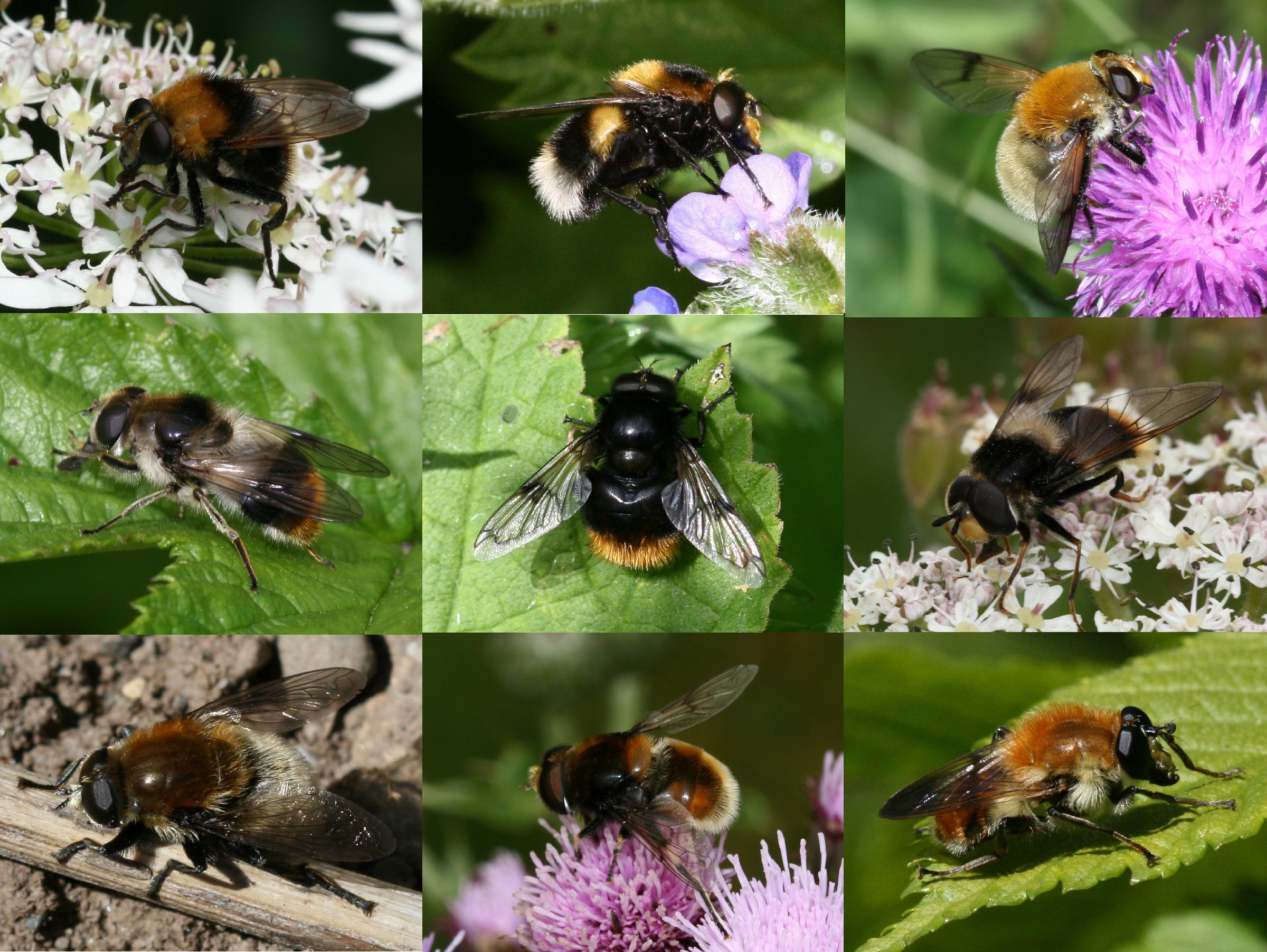
Bumblebee-mimicking Volucella bombylans
