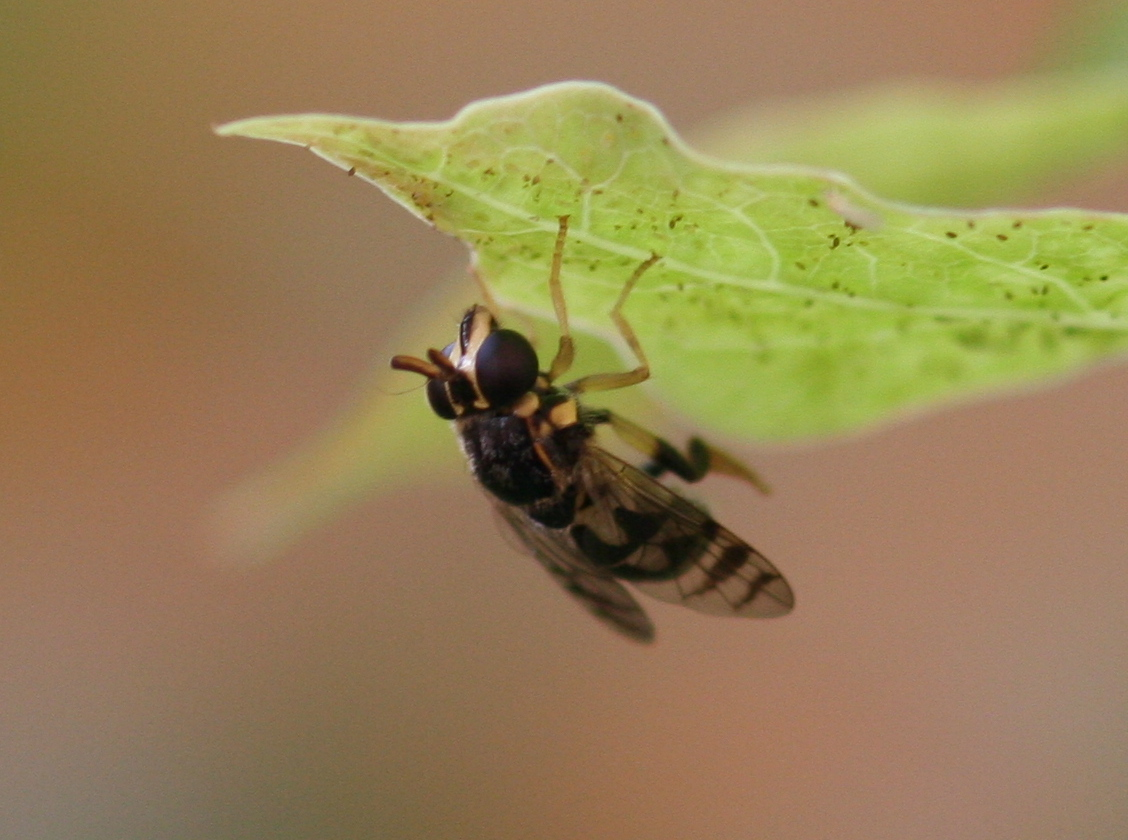
- Graptomyza sp.

Scientific classification
- Kingdom: Animalia
- Phylum: Arthropoda
- Class: Insecta
- Order: Diptera
- Family: Syrphidae
- Subfamily: Eristalinae
- Tribe: Volucellini
- Genus: Graptomyza; Weidemann 1820

Type species
- Graptomyza longirostris Weidemann 1820

Synonyms
- Baryterocera Walker, 1856; Barytocera Bigot, 1883; Graptomyza Jensen, 1832; Protograptomyza Hull, 1949; Ptilostylomyia Bigot, 1882

= Graptomyza =

Genus of flies

Graptomyza is a genus of hoverflies.

== Species ==
- G. alabeta Séguy, 1948
- G. amplicavum Whittington, 1992
- G. angustimarginata Brunetti, 1923
- G. antipoda Shannon, 1927
- G. arisana Shiraki, 1930
- G. atripes Bigot, 1883
- G. aurea Bezzi, 1915
- G. bergi Greene, 1949
- G. brevirostris Wiedemann, 1820
- G. breviscutum Curran, 1929
- G. chaetomelas Doesburg, 1966
- G. clarala Whittington, 1992
- G. coniceps Meijere, 1929
- G. coomani Séguy, 1948
- G. cornuta Meijere, 1914
- G. cynocephala Kertész, 1914
- G. dentata Kertész, 1914
- G. doddi Ferguson, 1926
- G. dolichocera Kertész, 1914
- G. elegans Hull, 1950
- G. fascipennis Sack, 1922
- G. flavicollis Ferguson, 1926
- G. flavipes Meijere, 1911
- G. flavitincta Hull, 1950
- G. flavonotata Brunetti, 1917
- G. flavorhyncha Hull, 1941
- G. formosana Shiraki, 1930
- G. gibbula Walker, 1859
- G. globigaster Hull, 1943
- G. hardyi Greene, 1949
- G. hova Keiser, 1971
- G. ihai Shiraki, 1968
- G. inclusa Walker, 1856
- G. interrupta Wiedemann, 1830
- G. ishikawai Shiraki, 1954
- G. itoi Shiraki, 1954
- G. jacobsoni Meijere, 1911
- G. javensis Greene, 1949
- G. latiusculus Walker, 1861
- G. lineata Osten Sacken, 1881
- G. literata Osten Sacken, 1882
- G. loewi Goot, 1964
- G. longicornis Meijere, 1908
- G. longirostris Wiedemann, 1820
- G. longqishanica Huang & Cheng, 1995
- G. lutea Whittington, 1992
- G. maculipennis Meijere, 1908
- G. melliponaeformis Doleschall, 1858
- G. microdon Osten Sacken, 1882
- G. minor Shiraki, 1963
- G. mitis Curran & Bryan, 1926
- G. multiseta Huang & Cheng, 1995
- G. nigra Bezzi, 1915
- G. nigricavum Whittington, 1992
- G. nigripes Brunetti, 1913
- G. nitobei Shiraki, 1930
- G. obtusa Kertész, 1914
- G. oceanica Shiraki, 1963
- G. okawai Shiraki, 1956
- G. pallidinotata Whittington, 1992
- G. palmeri Greene, 1949
- G. perforata Doesburg, 1960
- G. periaurantaca Huang & Cheng, 1995
- G. phyllocera Hull, 1950
- G. plumifer Ferguson, 1926
- G. punctata Meijere, 1908
- G. quadrifaria Szilády, 1942
- G. rectifacies Meijere, 1916
- G. robusticornis Doesburg, 1957
- G. seimunda Curran, 1928
- G. setigloba Hull, 1941
- G. sexnotata Brunetti, 1908
- G. signata Walker, 1860
- G. spectralis Hull, 1950
- G. spinifera Whittington, 1994
- G. suavissima Karsch, 1888
- G. subflavonotata Mutin, 1983
- G. summa Whittington, 1992
- G. takeuchii Shiraki, 1954
- G. tibialis Walker, 1858
- G. tinctovittata Brunetti, 1915
- G. triangulifera Bigot, 1883
- G. trilineata Meijere, 1908
- G. triseriata Meijere, 1929
- G. uchiyamai ShiraAustralasiaki, 1930
- G. varia Walker, 1849
- G. ventralis Wiedemann, 1830
- G. xanthopoda Bezzi, 1915
- G. yangi Huang & Cheng, 1995
- G. yasumatui Ouchi, 1943
