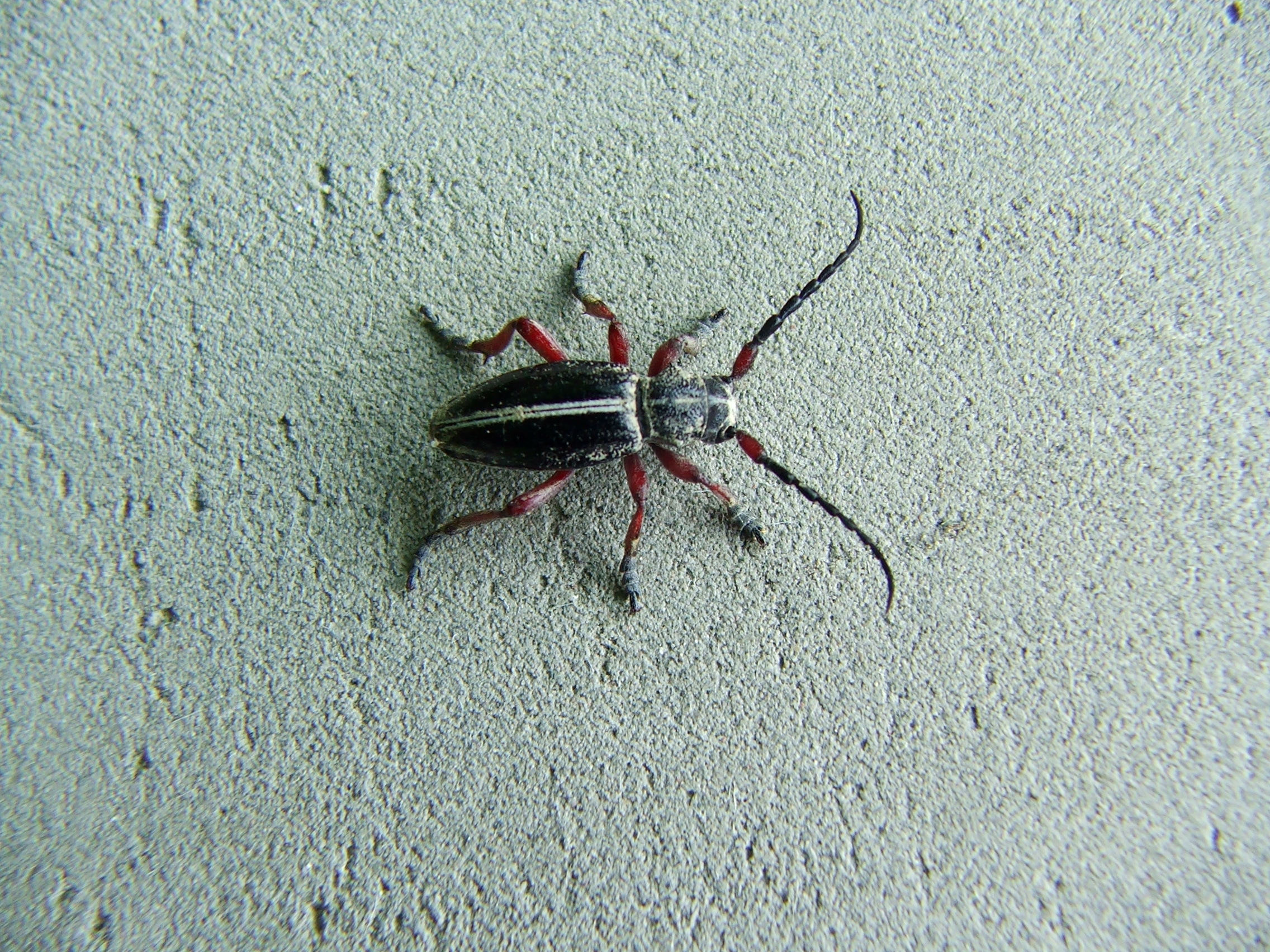

Scientific classification
- Kingdom: Animalia
- Phylum: Arthropoda
- Clade: Pancrustacea
- Class: Insecta
- Order: Coleoptera
- Suborder: Polyphaga
- Infraorder: Cucujiformia
- Family: Cerambycidae
- Genus: Dorcadion
- Species: D. pedestre

Binomial name
- Dorcadion pedestre (Poda, 1761)

= Dorcadion pedestre =

Species of beetle

Dorcadion pedestre is a species of a longhorn beetle in the subfamily Lamiinae.

== Description ==
The length of the adults is 11–16 millimetres (0.43–0.63 in). They are black colored. The first segments of the antennae and legs are red. The elytron has a white seam and is dull colored, and has a slightly marginal strip at the top of the shoulder.

== Subspecies ==
- Dorcadion pedestre kaszabi (Breuning, 1956) — distributed in Hungary.
- Dorcadion pedestre pedestre (Poda, 1761) — is widely distributed in Europe.
