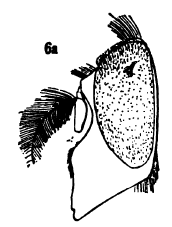
- Male head from Williston S.W.

Scientific classification
- Kingdom: Animalia
- Phylum: Arthropoda
- Class: Insecta
- Order: Diptera
- Family: Syrphidae
- Genus: Volucella
- Species: V. evecta

Binomial name
- Volucella evecta Walker, 1852

Synonyms
- Volucella bombylans evecta Johnson, 1916

= Volucella evecta =

Species of fly

Volucella evecta, the eastern swiftwing, is an uncommon species of hoverfly that has been considered a subspecies of Volucella bombylans, but has been shown to be a distinct species. This species is a bumblebee mimic. It resembles a number of species, including Bombus pensylvanicus, Bombus affinis, Bombus bimaculatus, and Habropoda laboriosa. The range of this species is from Eastern North America and Canada from Georgia to New Brunswick. The adults have been observed feeding on Geum, Viburnum, Rubus, and other flowering plants. Larvae of this species are not known, but larvae in this genus feed on the debris and larvae in bee and wasp nests.

== Description ==
For terms see Morphology of Diptera.

Syrphidae_(Volucella)_wing_veins

Size

13–18 millimetres (0.51–0.71 in)

Head

The frons is black with yellow pile The face is black to chestnut with yellow pile. In profile, the face is excavated below the antennae. The antennae has an elongate dark red flagellum with long densely plumose arista. The eyes are pilose with eyes contiguous in the male.

Thorax

The scutum is black and entirely covered with yellow pile. The scutellum is yellow with yellow pile. The pleura are yellow pilose anteriorly.

Wings

The marginal cell is closed. The anterior cross-vein M1 curves basally wings with a dark brown spot

Legs

The legs are black with black pile.

Abdomen

The abdomen is black with black pile except the second segment, which is covered with yellow pile.
