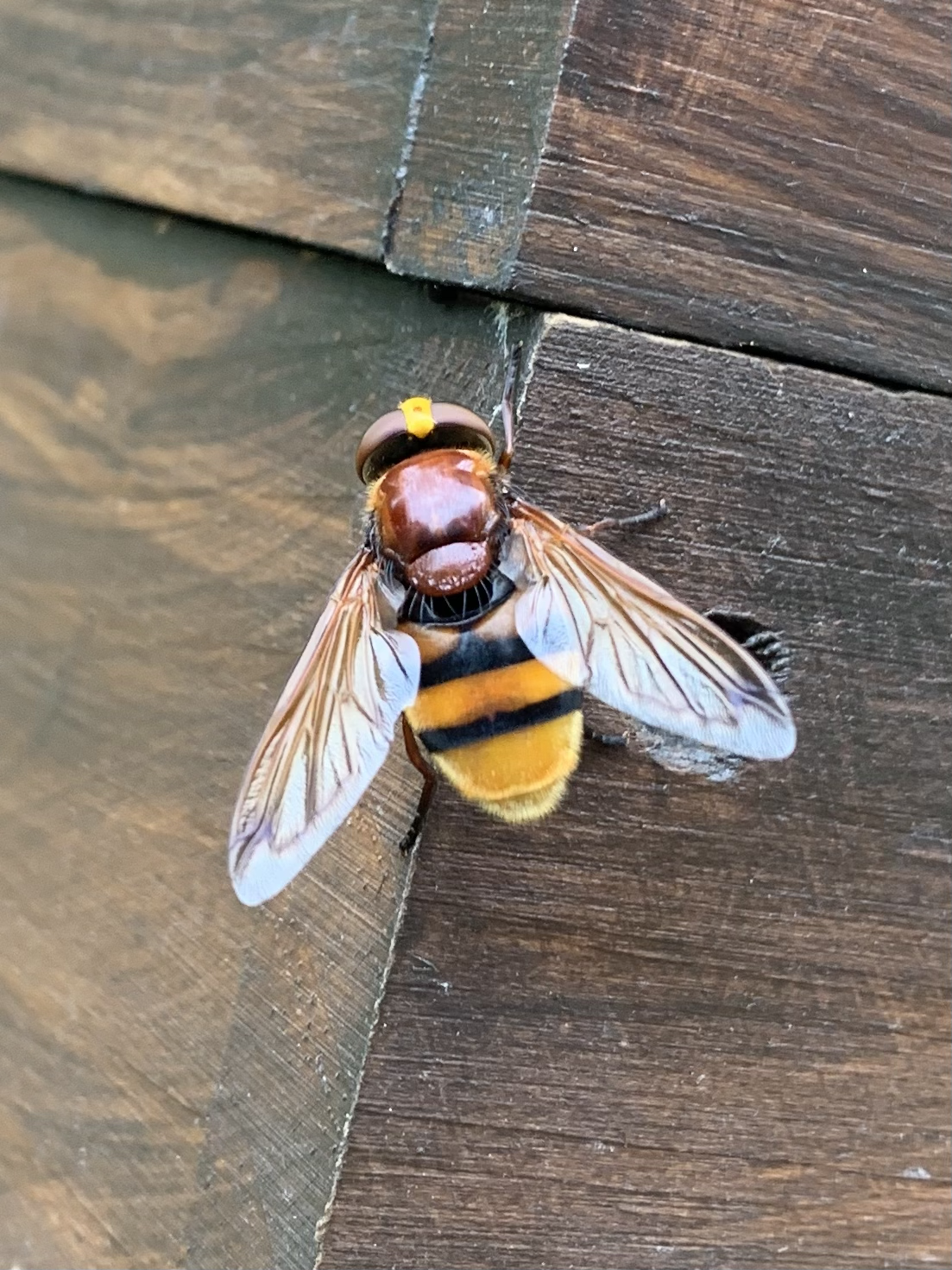
- Volucella zonaria, female

Scientific classification
- Kingdom: Animalia
- Phylum: Arthropoda
- Clade: Pancrustacea
- Class: Insecta
- Order: Diptera
- Family: Syrphidae
- Genus: Volucella
- Species: V. zonaria

Binomial name
- Volucella zonaria (Poda, 1761)

Synonyms
- List: Conops zonaria Poda, 1761; Conops bifasciatus Scopoli, 1763; Musca valentina Müller, 1766; Syrphus bifasciatus Panzer, 1792; Volucella beckeri Goot, 1961; Volucella fasciata Herrich-Schaffer, 1829; Volucella fasciata Verrall, 1901; Volucella radicum Schrank, 1803

= Volucella zonaria =

Species of fly

Volucella zonaria, the hornet mimic hoverfly, is a species of hoverfly. These flies are capable of buzz pollination.

== Distribution ==
This species is present in most of Europe, in Tunisia, Iran, Russia (to Far East) and in Mongolia.

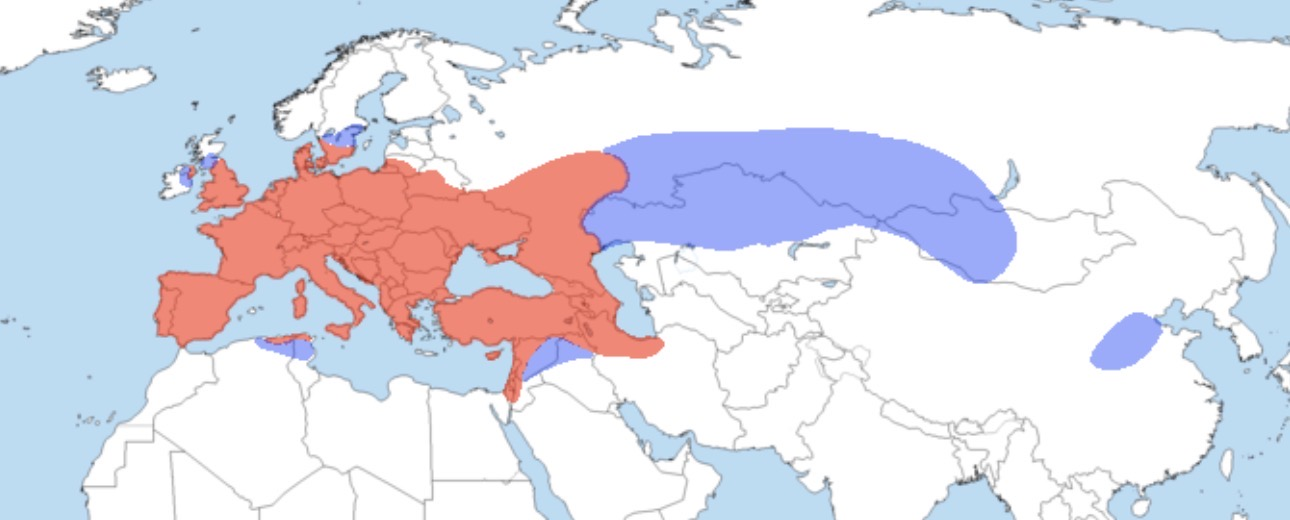
Hornet Mimic Hover Fly Habitat Map; Red: Confirmed, Blue: Obscured

In Great Britain, it was only known from two specimens prior to 1940, so was regarded as rare. Since then, it has become increasingly widespread in many parts of the South and South East England, often in association with parks and gardens, where adults are usually seen visiting flowers. Elsewhere in England, only a few scattered records exist.

== Habitat ==
These hoverflies usually inhabit meadows close to forests.

== Description ==
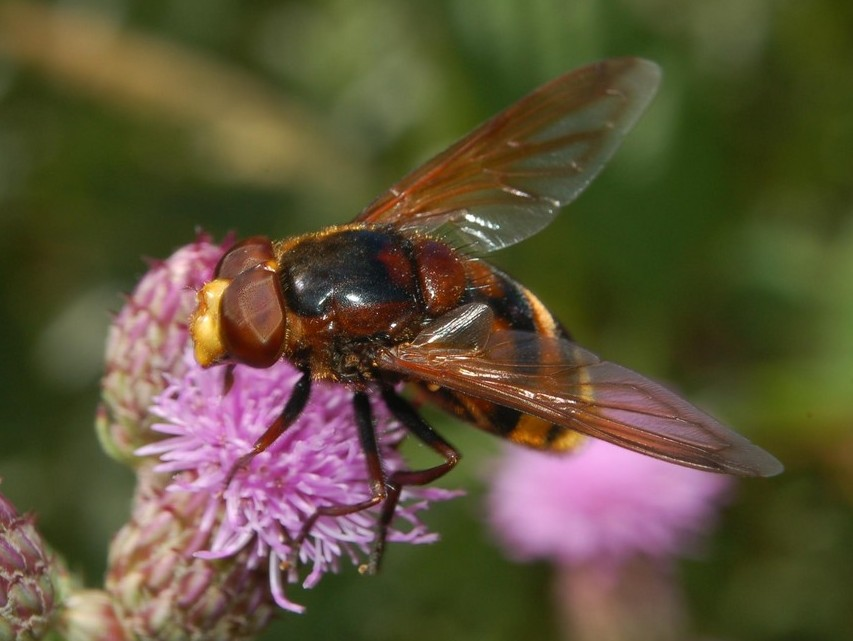
Volucella zonaria, male

Volucella zonaria can reach a length of 25 millimetres (0.98 in), with a wingspan of about 40 mm. These very large and wide hoverflies have reddish-brown shining thorax with dark brown marks, and a reddish-brown scutellum. The head shows a waxy yellow face, with yellow forehead and antennae. The large ovoid compound eyes are reddish with dense and short hairs. In the males they are very close to each other, so that the forehead is very narrow. The abdomen is reddish yellow, with two wide black bands. The underside has broad black bars. The first abdominal segment is black. The second tergite is chestnut brown. Wings are amber infused. The legs are basically red-brown, but black at the base.

This species mimics the European hornet (Vespa crabro), by its size, by its appearance and its buzzing flight.

== Biology ==
Volucella zonaria feeding on nectar

Adults can be found from May to September, but they are most common in July / August. Like all Volucella, the adults of these hoverflies are migratory. Volucella zonaria is a Mediterranean migratory species. These hoverflies mainly feed on nectar of flowers of various plants, especially Valeriana, Oregano, Mentha longifolia, Scabiosa, Cornus, Ligustrum, Cirsium, Carduus, Buddleia and various other flowering shrubs. Females lay their eggs in wasp and hornet nests. The larvae live as commensals in nests of bees, hornets and of social wasps of the genus Vespula. The pupae overwinter in the soil and hatch in following spring.
