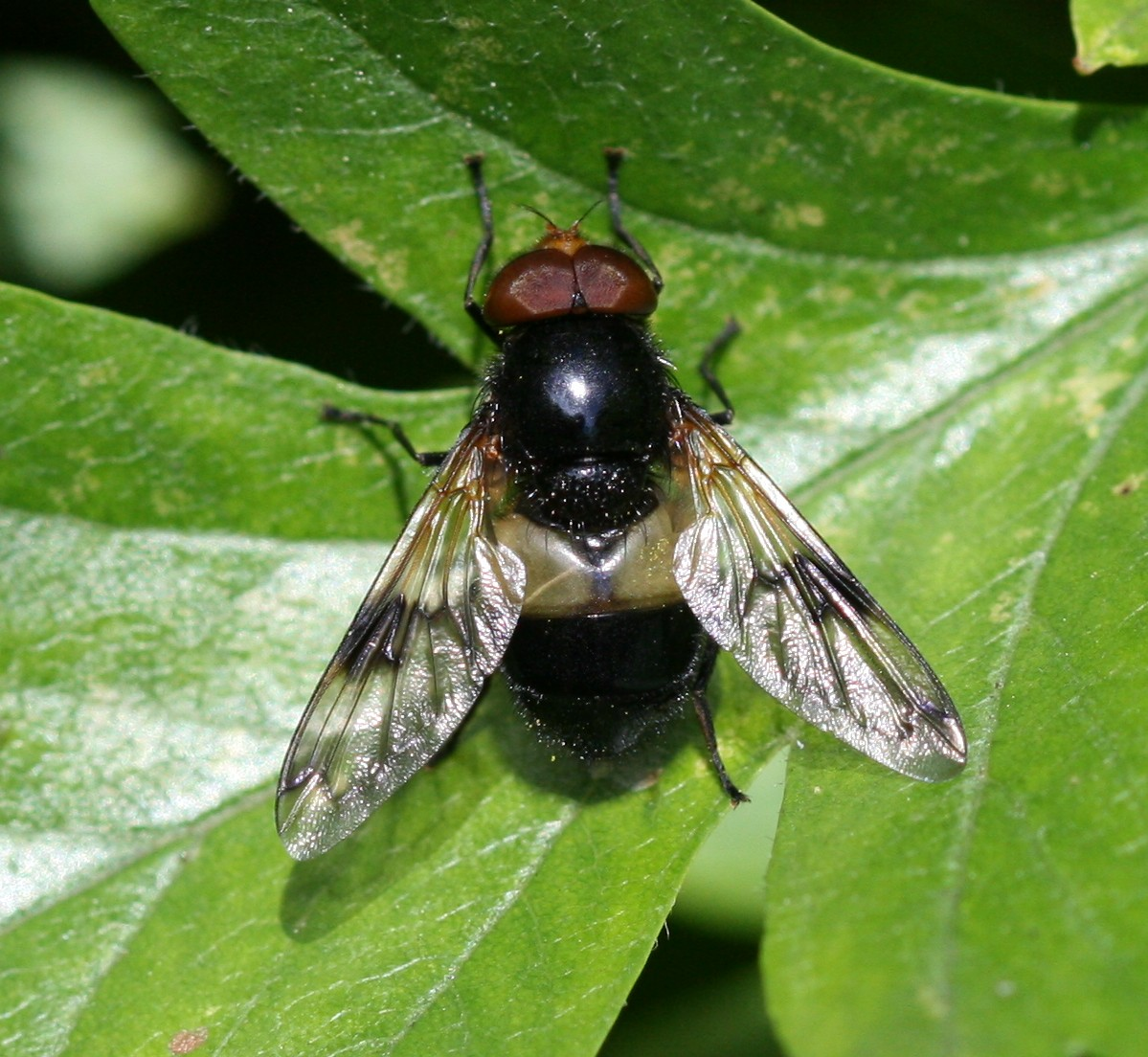
- Volucella pellucens, male
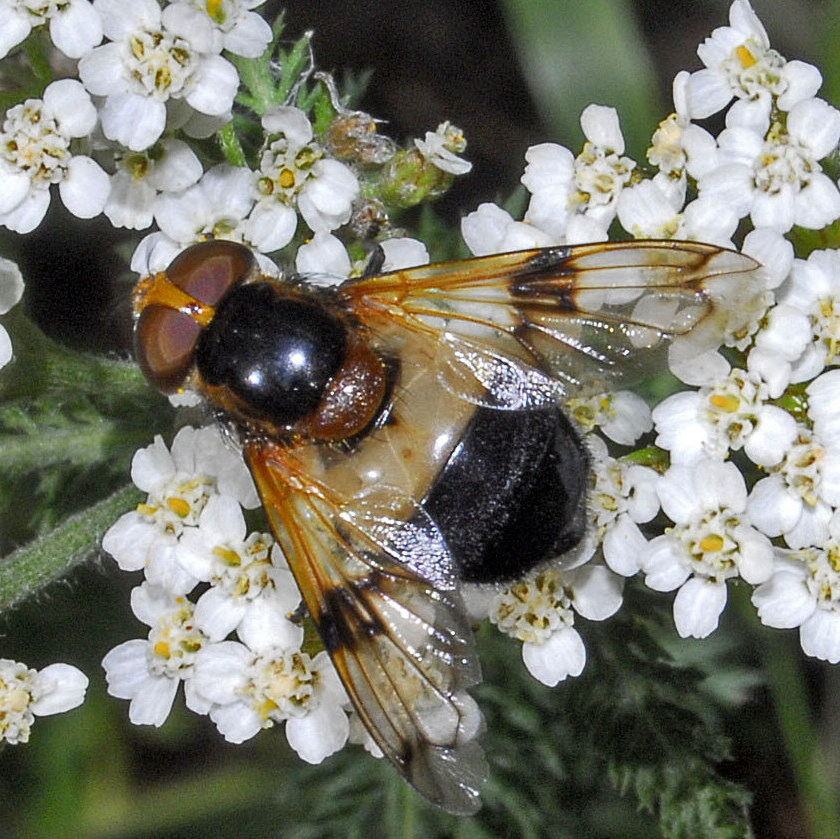
- Female

Scientific classification
- Kingdom: Animalia
- Phylum: Arthropoda
- Clade: Pancrustacea
- Class: Insecta
- Order: Diptera
- Family: Syrphidae
- Genus: Volucella
- Species: V. pellucens

Binomial name
- Volucella pellucens (Linnaeus, 1758)

Synonyms
- Musca pellucens Linnaeus, 1758; Musca fera Harris, 1776; Volucella fera (Harris, 1776)

= Volucella pellucens =

Species of fly

Volucella pellucens, the pellucid fly, is a hoverfly.

== Distribution and habitat ==
This species occurs in much of Europe, from Ireland and across the Palearctic to Japan. The adult V. pellucens is usually found in woodlands and wooded hedgerows, but will enter gardens.

== Description ==
Volucella pellucens is about 13–17 mm in length, with a wing length about 10–15.5 mm.

This hoverfly has a broad, mainly black body, but the front part of the abdomen has a broad, yellow band, giving it the appearance of a bee or wasp. The two wings are transparent, as with most flies, but the leading edge is amber, with a brown patch on each wing.

The mimicry of bees or wasps in shape and colouration is shown by other hoverflies, which is thought to protect against falling prey to birds and other insectivores that avoid eating true wasps because of their stings. However, the difference between hoverflies and wasps or bees is hoverflies have two wings, and the Hymenoptera species have four.

== Biology ==
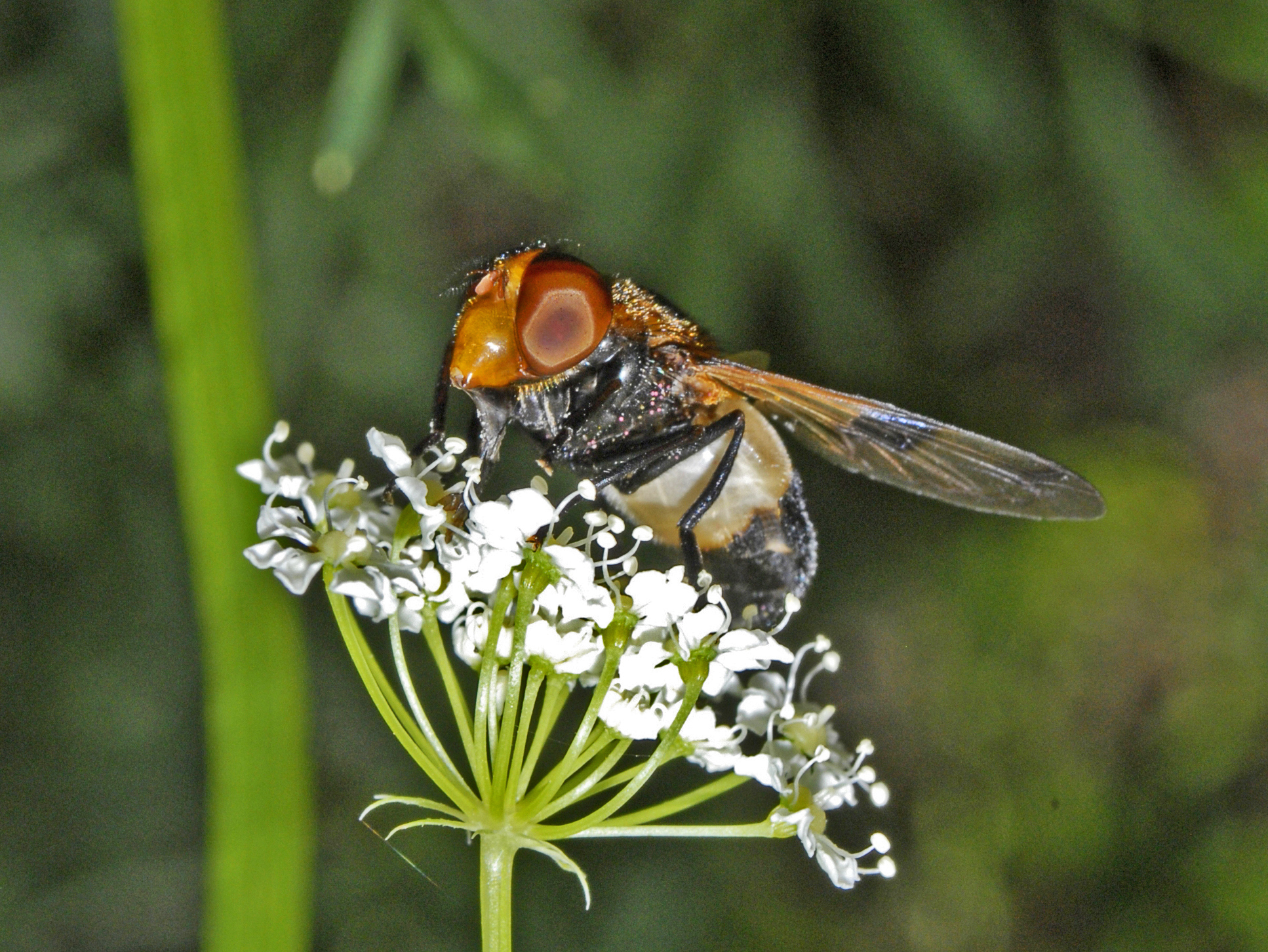
Female feeding on an Apiaceae species, side view

Adults live on nectar and pollen, as with most hoverflies, and visits a large range of flowers from May to October, showing a distinct preference for white flowers, such as Sambucus, Cornus, Ligustrum, Rubus idaeus, and bramble and Apiaceae, but they also feed on Asteraceae, Valeriana officinalis, Succisa pratensis, Chamerion angustifolium, and Urtica dioica. It typically flies at head height.

The female enters the underground paper nests of the common wasp, Vespula vulgaris, or the German wasp, V. germanica, and lays her eggs. Despite the conspicuous nature of the intruder, the hosts do not appear to register her presence as she makes her way into the otherwise well-guarded nest entrance. The V. pellucens larvae then feed on the hosts' young and dead adults.

When the eggs hatch, the larvae drop to the bottom of the nest chamber, where they feed as scavengers on debris. This may include dead wasp grubs and adults, remains of food brought into the nest by the wasps, and other insects living there. Mature larvae are sometimes on the combs and have been recorded feeding on dead or moribund wasp larvae and pupae that were left in the combs when the nest was abandoned by the wasps in the autumn. Fully grown larvae leave the nest and pupate in the soil below. If the host nest is in the roof or walls of a house, then the larvae may end up crawling about in the dwelling space.

Adult hoverflies emerge the following year from about mid-May to June.

Video clip

== See also ==
- List of hoverfly species recorded in Britain
