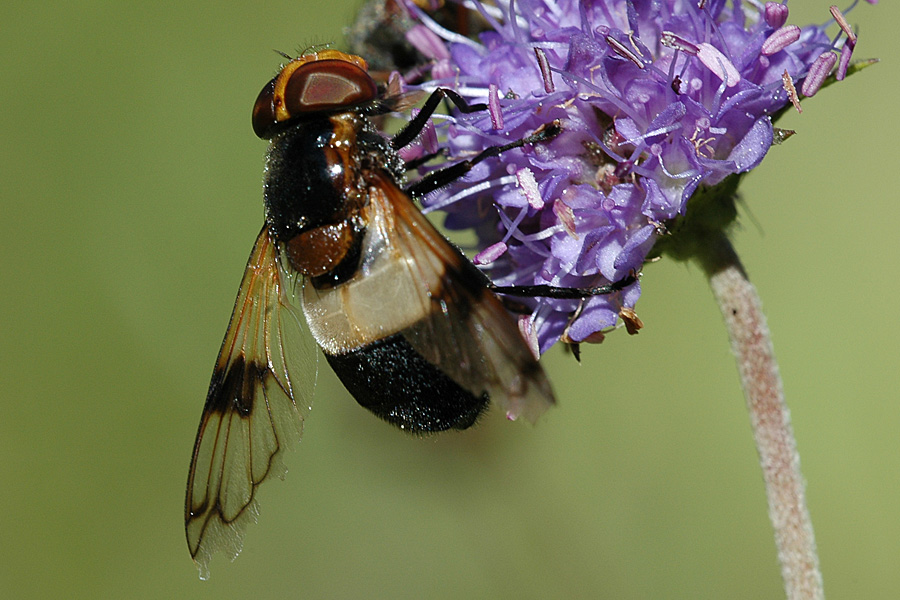
- Volucella pellucens

Scientific classification
- Kingdom: Animalia
- Phylum: Arthropoda
- Clade: Pancrustacea
- Class: Insecta
- Order: Diptera
- Family: Syrphidae
- Tribe: Volucellini
- Genus: Volucella; Geoffroy, 1762

Species
- See text

Synonyms
- Macrostoma Swinderen, 1822

= Volucella =

Genus of flies

Volucella is a genus of large, broad-bodied, dramatic hover-flies. They have distinctive plumose aristae and the face is extended downward. They are strongly migratory and males are often territorial. Adults feed on nectar of flowers and are often seen sunning on leaves. The larvae of most species live in nests of bumblebees and social wasps, where they are detritivores and larval predators.

== Selected species ==
- Volucella abdita Violovich, 1978
- Volucella anastasia Hull, 1946
- Volucella arctica Johnson, 1916
- Volucella bombylans (Linnaeus, 1758)
- Volucella dracaena Curran
- Volucella elegans Loew, 1862
- Volucella eugenia Williston, 1887
- Volucella evecta Walker, 1852
- Volucella facialis Williston, 1882
- Volucella flavizona Cheng, 2012
- Volucella galbicorpus Cheng, 2012
- Volucella inanis (Linnaeus, 1758)
- Volucella inflata (Fabricius, 1794)
- Volucella jeddona Bigot, 1875
- Volucella latifasciata Cheng, 2012
- Volucella linearis Walker, 1849
- Volucella liquida Erichson in Wagner, 1841
- Volucella lutzi Curran, 1930
- Volucella matsumurai Han & Choi, 2001
- Volucella nigricans Coquillett, 1898
- Volucella nigropicta Portschinsky, 1884
- Volucella pellucens (Linnaeus, 1758)
- Volucella plumatoides Hervé-Bazin, 1923
- Volucella suzukii Matsumura, 1916
- Volucella tau Bigot, 1883
- Volucella unipunctata Curran, 1926
- Volucella zonaria (Poda, 1761)

== Gallery ==
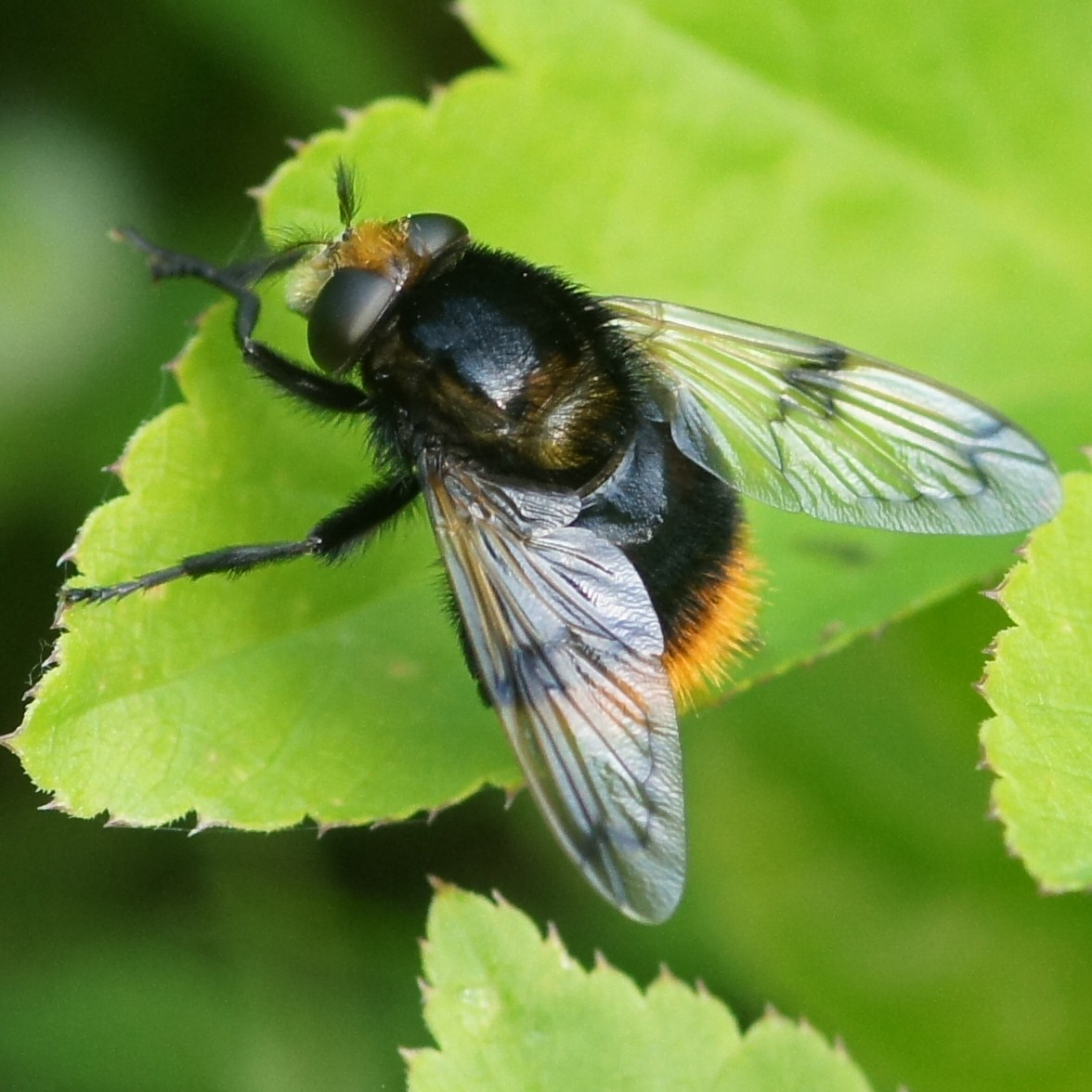
Volucella bombylans var. bombylans female

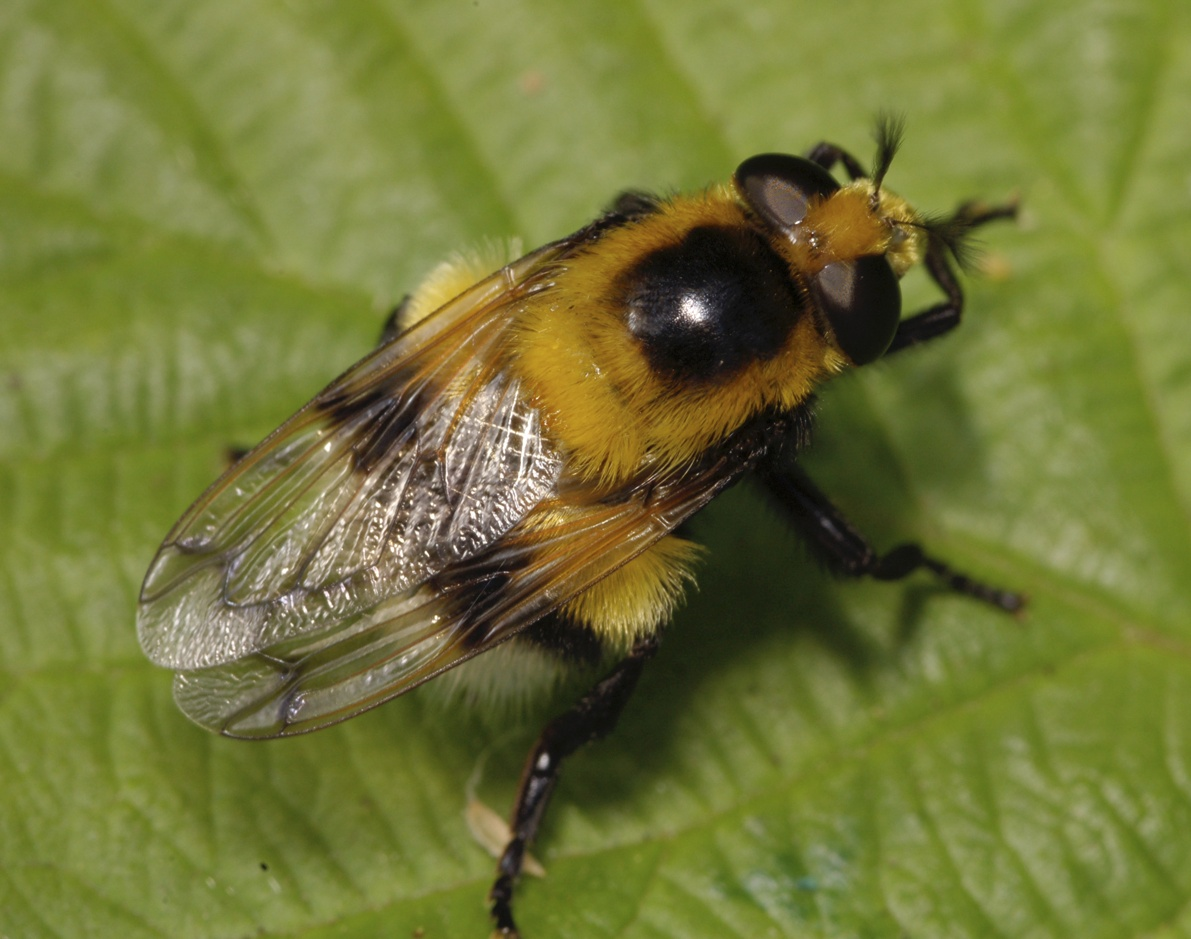
Volucella bombylans var. plumata female

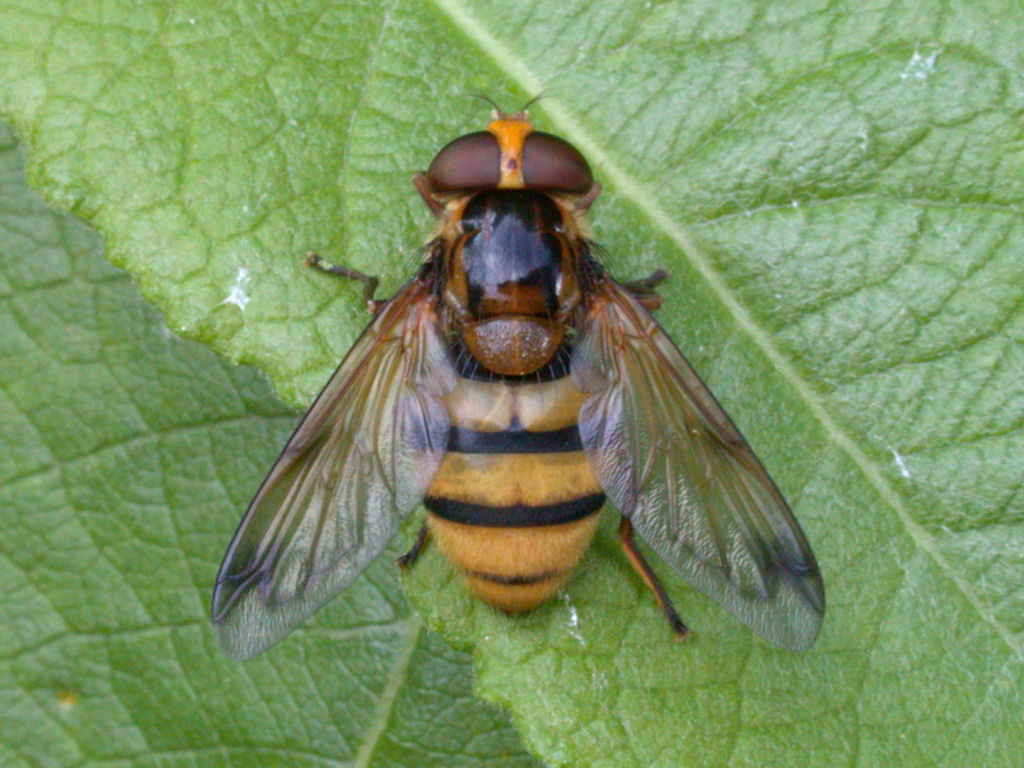
Volucella inanis female

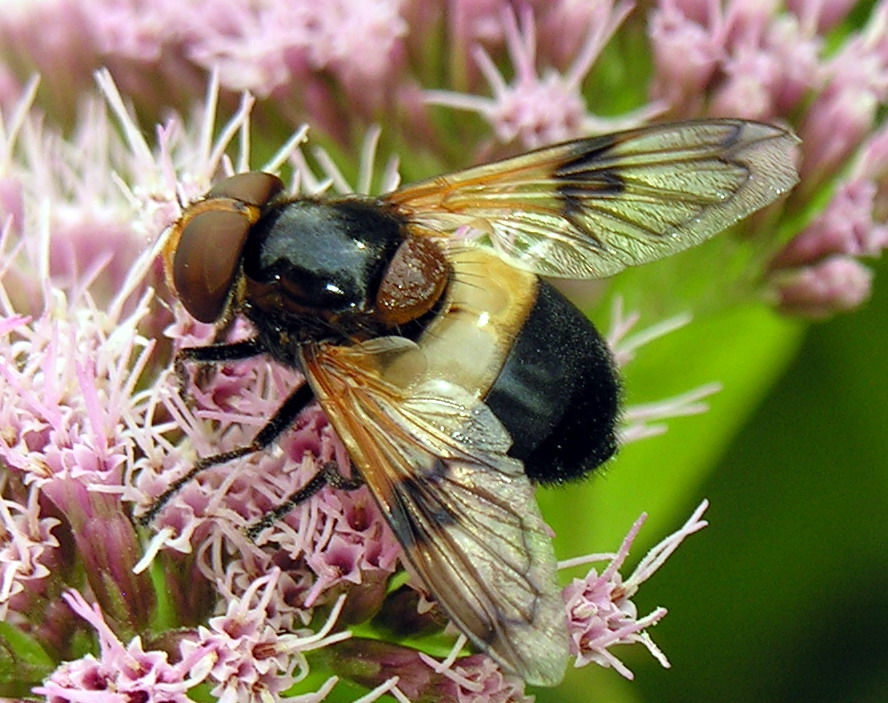
Volucella pellucens female

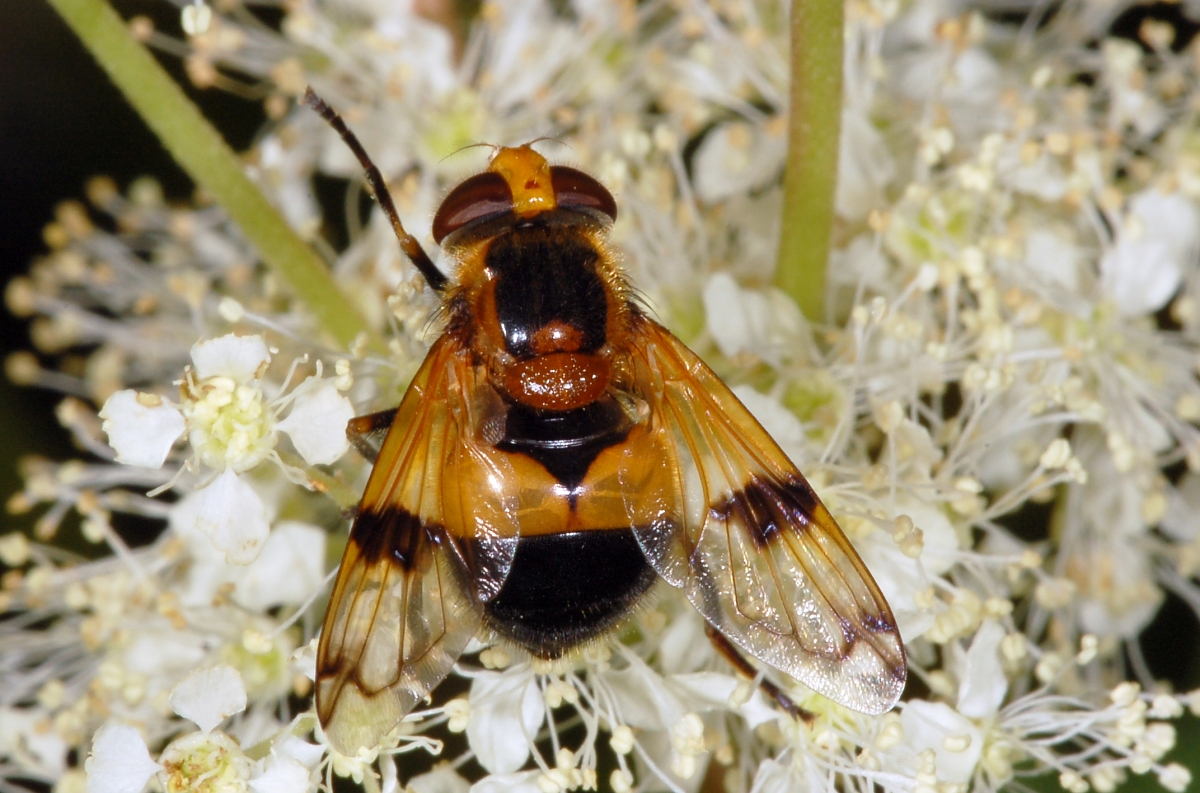
Volucella inflata female

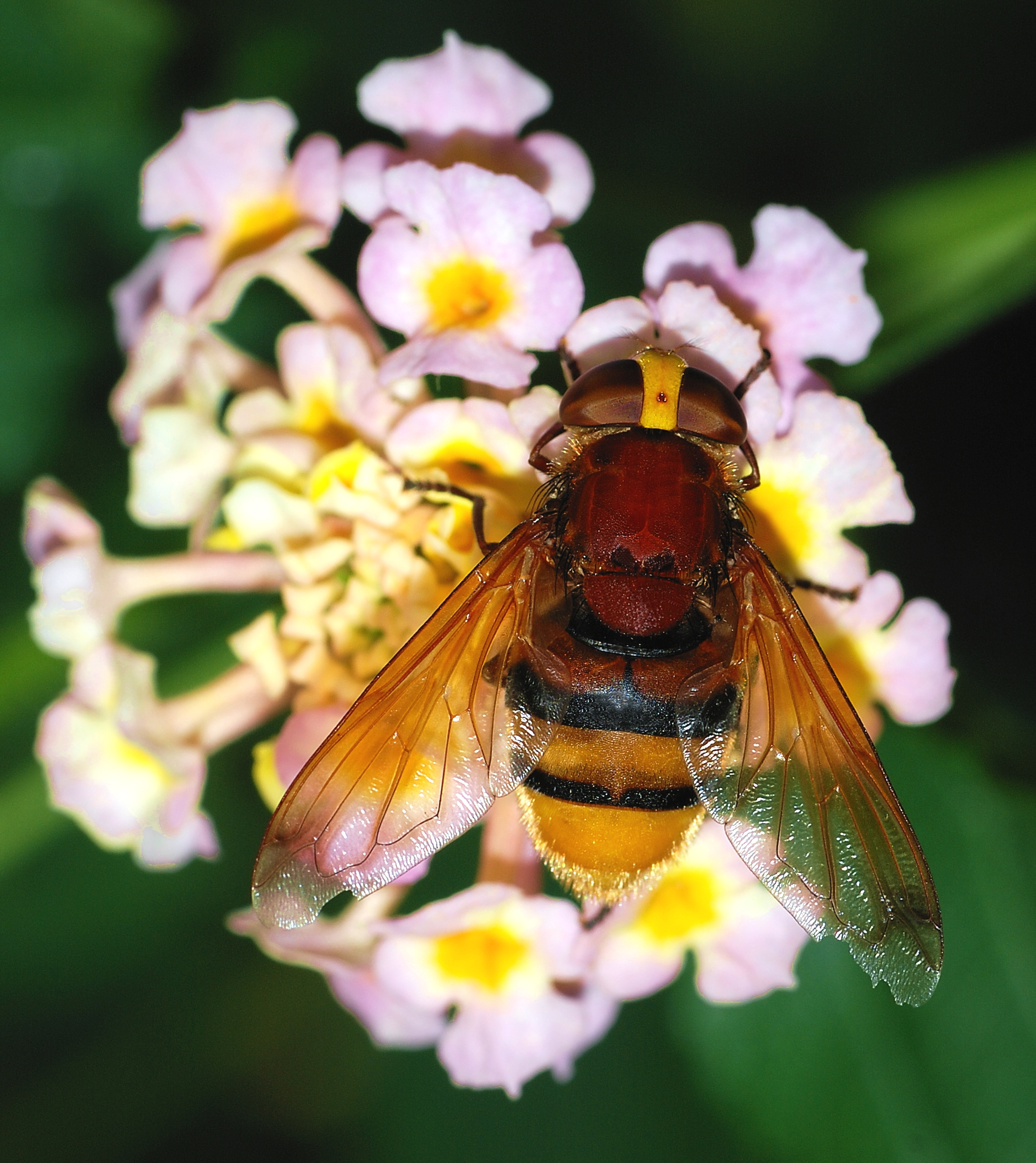
Volucella zonaria female
