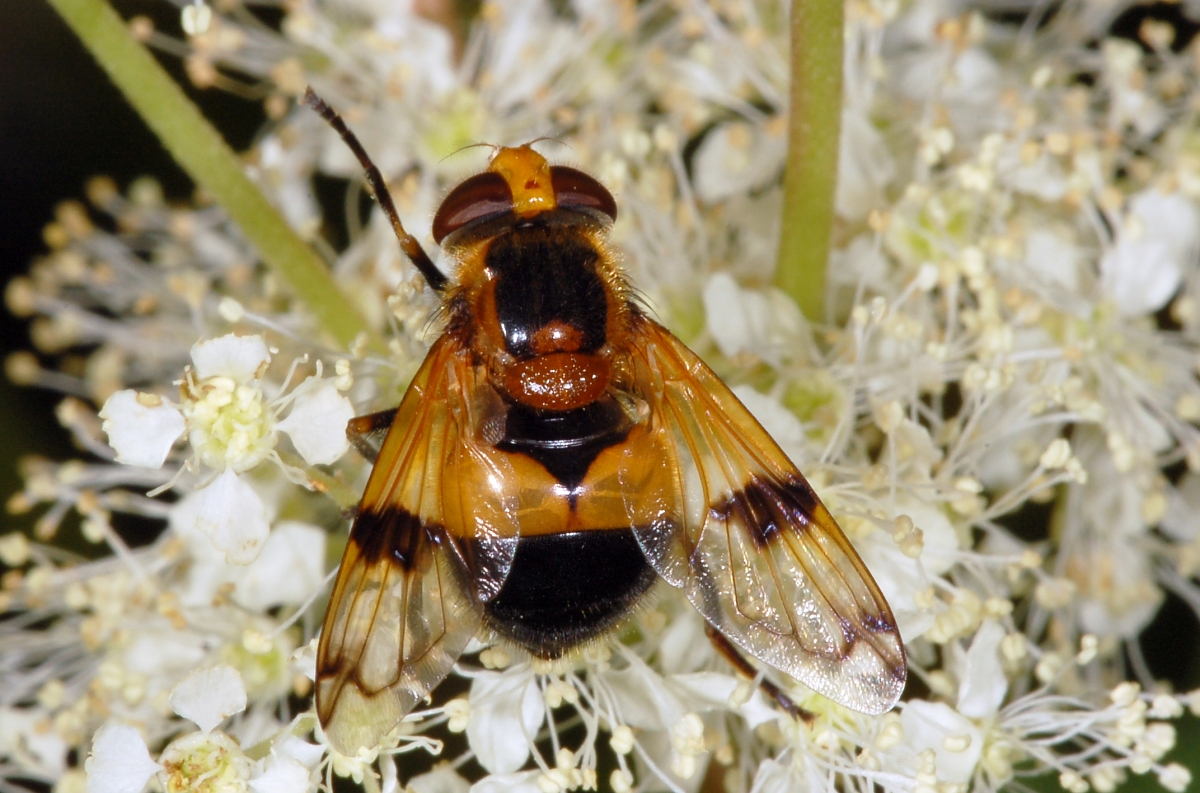

Scientific classification
- Kingdom: Animalia
- Phylum: Arthropoda
- Class: Insecta
- Order: Diptera
- Family: Syrphidae
- Genus: Volucella
- Species: V. inflata

Binomial name
- Volucella inflata (Fabricius, 1794)

Synonyms
- Syrphus inflata Fabricius, 1794

= Volucella inflata =

Species of fly

Volucella inflata is a large species of European hoverfly.

== Description ==
V. inflata is a large, short-haired fly. Though a little smaller than most European species of Volucella, typical body length is 12–15 mm and wing length is 11–13 mm. The thorax is black with orange margins, and the scutellum is orange with light-coloured hairs at the apex. The abdomen is largely black, with the exception of dark orange brown patches on the second tergite.

== Biology ==
It is found mostly in deciduous forests with mature trees, though has been known to venture into domestic gardens. Adults fly from May to July and feed on nectar from flowers, mostly from umbellifers. Larvae inhabit social insect nests.

== Distribution ==
This fly is very local over much of Europe, being found from Sweden and northern Germany, the Pyrenees and northern Spain, Britain, eastwards through Central Europe into European Russia and the Caucasus, and the former Yugoslavia and Bulgaria.
