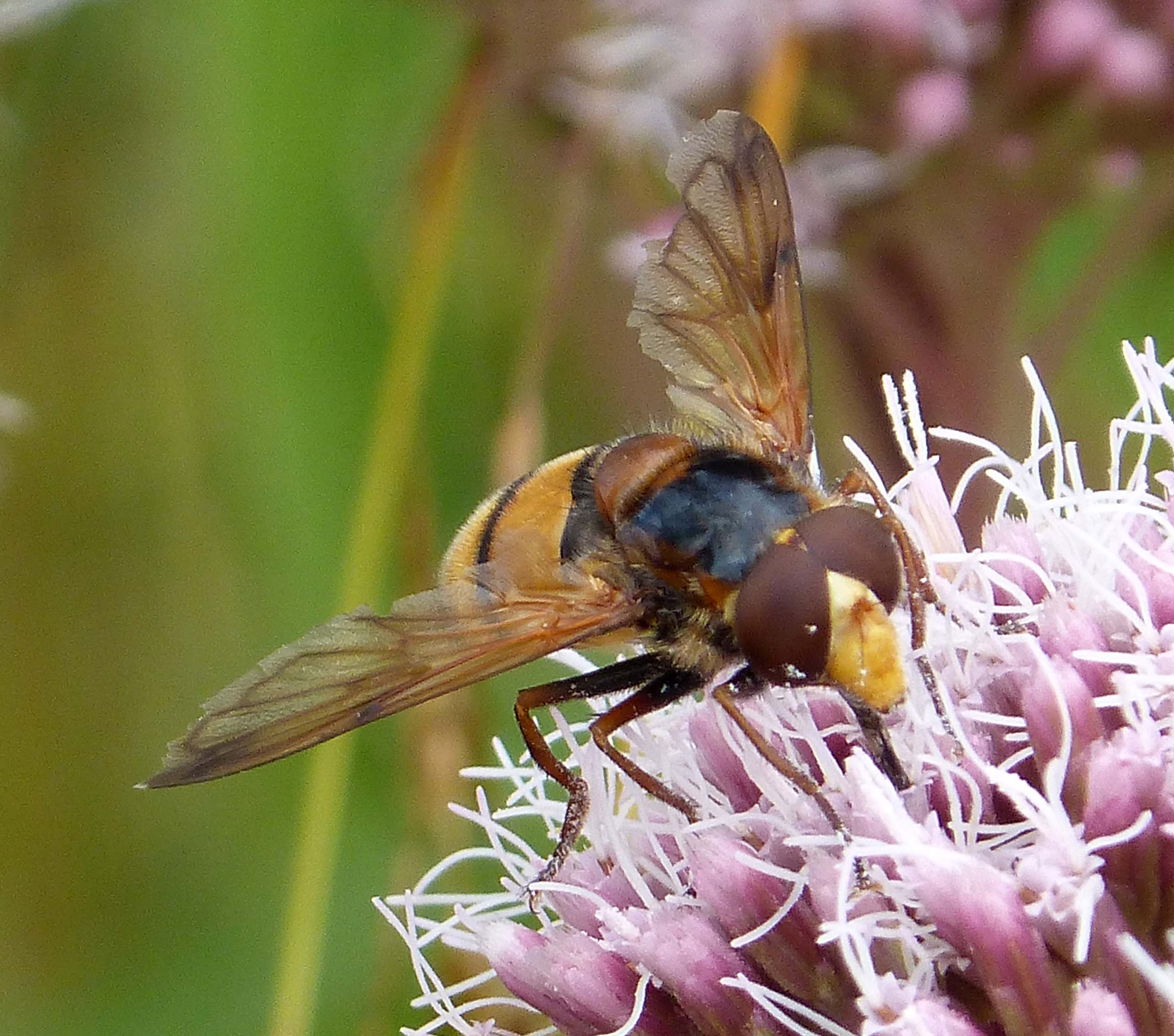
- Male
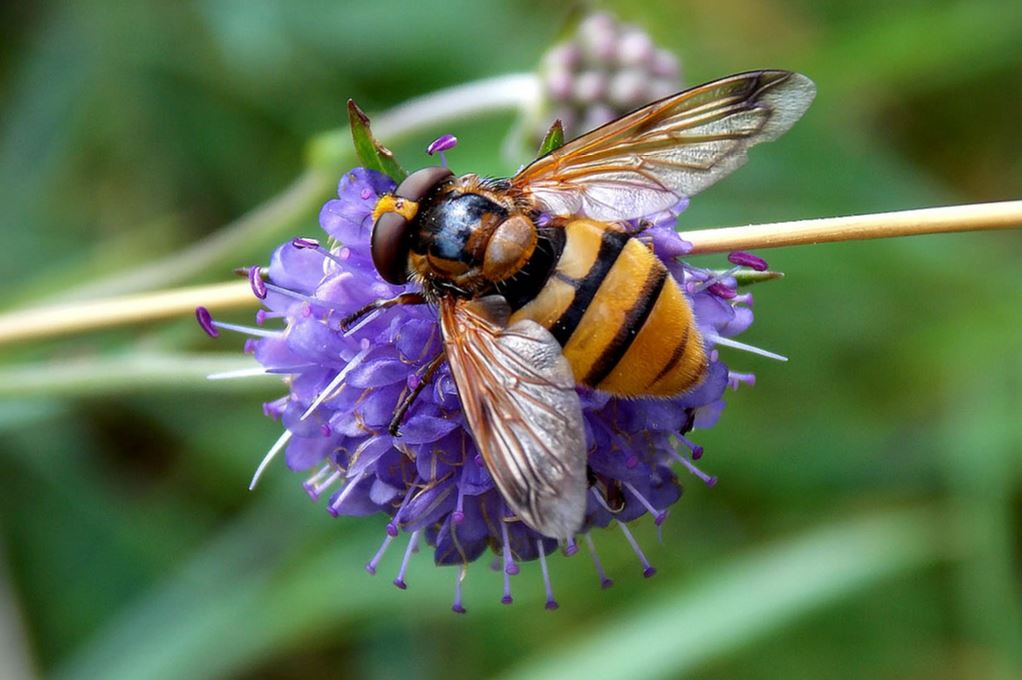
- Female on Succisa pratensis

Scientific classification
- Kingdom: Animalia
- Phylum: Arthropoda
- Class: Insecta
- Order: Diptera
- Family: Syrphidae
- Genus: Volucella
- Species: V. inanis

Binomial name
- Volucella inanis (Linnaeus, 1758)

Synonyms
- Musca inanis Linnaeus, 1758; Musca annulata Harris, 1776; Volucella annulata (Harris, 1776)

= Volucella inanis =

Species of fly

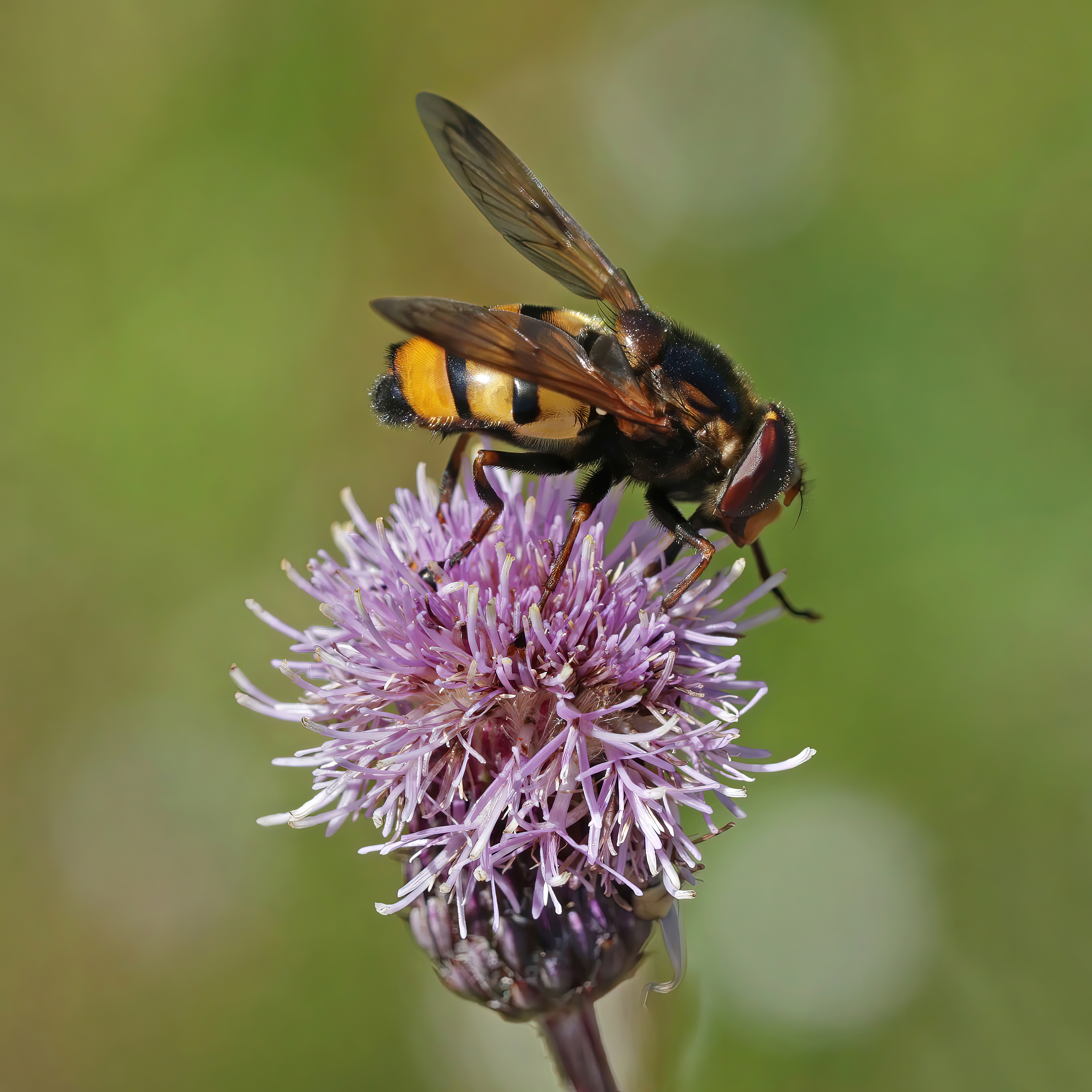
female

Volucella inanis is a species of hoverfly belonging to the family Syrphidae.

== Distribution ==
This species is present in most of Europe, in eastern Palearctic realm, in the Near East and in North Africa.

== Description ==
The adults reach 15–17 mm (0.59–0.67 in) long. They have three yellow bands on an otherwise black abdomen and thus closely resemble wasps in a form of mimicry. The first two bands are completely or partially interrupted by a black wedge. The head has feather-like antennae and the wings have darkened patches in the middle and on the tip.

== Biology ==
Volucella inanis can be encountered from early July to early September, feeding on flowers of species such as yarrow (Achillea millefolium), dill (Anethum graveolens), heather (Erica species), thistles (genera Carduus, Cirsium, and Onopordum) and Buddleja davidii.

The female lays eggs in the nests of social wasps and hornets (Vespa crabro, Vespula germanica, etc.). The larvae of this hoverfly are ectoparasites of larvae of the wasps.
