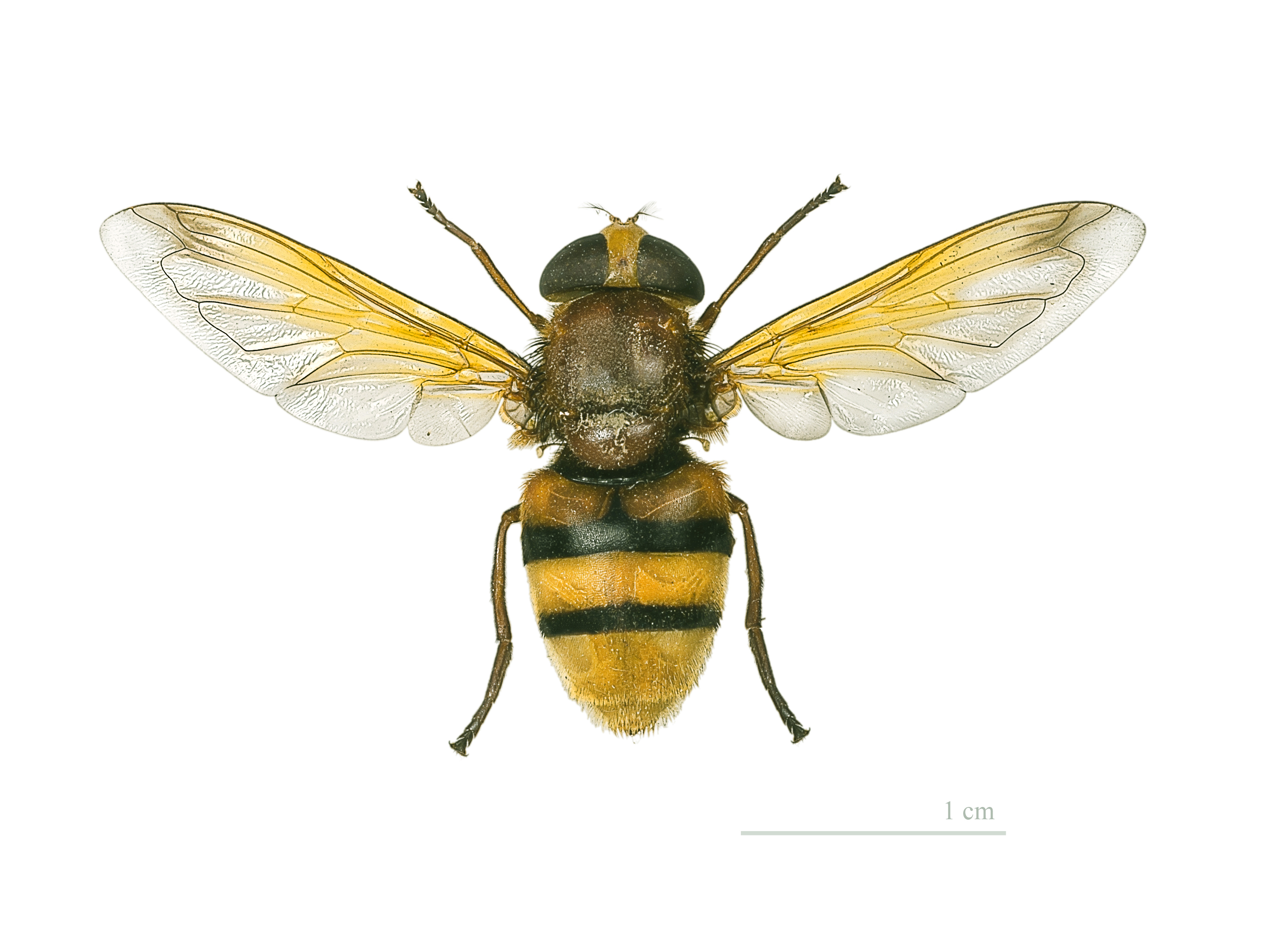
- Volucella zonaria ♀ specimen, dorsal perspective

Scientific classification
- Kingdom: Animalia
- Phylum: Arthropoda
- Clade: Pancrustacea
- Class: Insecta
- Order: Diptera
- Family: Syrphidae
- Subfamily: Eristalinae

Tribes
- See text

Synonyms
- Cheilosiinae (Williston) Wirth & Stone, 1956; Cheilosinae (Williston) Curran, 1928; Chilosiinae (Williston) Malloch, 1922; Chilosinae Williston, 1885; Eristaliinae (Newman) Malloch, 1922; Eristalina (Newman) Rondani, 1856; Eristalinae (Newman) Rondani, 1857; Eristalites Newman, 1834; Eristaliti (Newman) Lioy, 1864; Eristilinae (Newman) Shannon, 1922

= Eristalinae =

Subfamily of Syrphidae

Eristalinae (or Milesiinae) are one of the four subfamilies of the fly family Syrphidae, or hoverflies. A well-known species included in this subfamily is the common drone fly, Eristalis tenax.

Species in this subfamily are often mistaken for bees due to their exceptional Batesian mimicry, especially to resemble Honeybees (family Apidae). The best strategy for proper identification is to look at their eyes and wings and compare with fly morphology, to determine membership of family Syrphidae or of order Hymenoptera.

== Taxonomy ==
This subfamily consists of the following tribes:

- Brachyopini
- Callicerini
- Cerioidini
- Eristalini
- Merodontini
- Milesiini
- Rhingiini
- Sericomyiini
- Volucellini

== Gallery ==
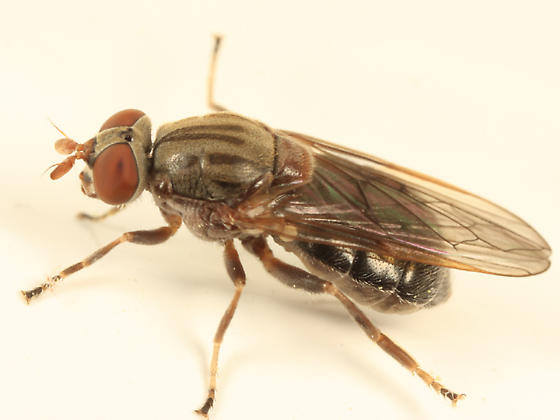
Brachyopa daeckei actual size 6.1–6.9 mm (1/4–9/32 in)

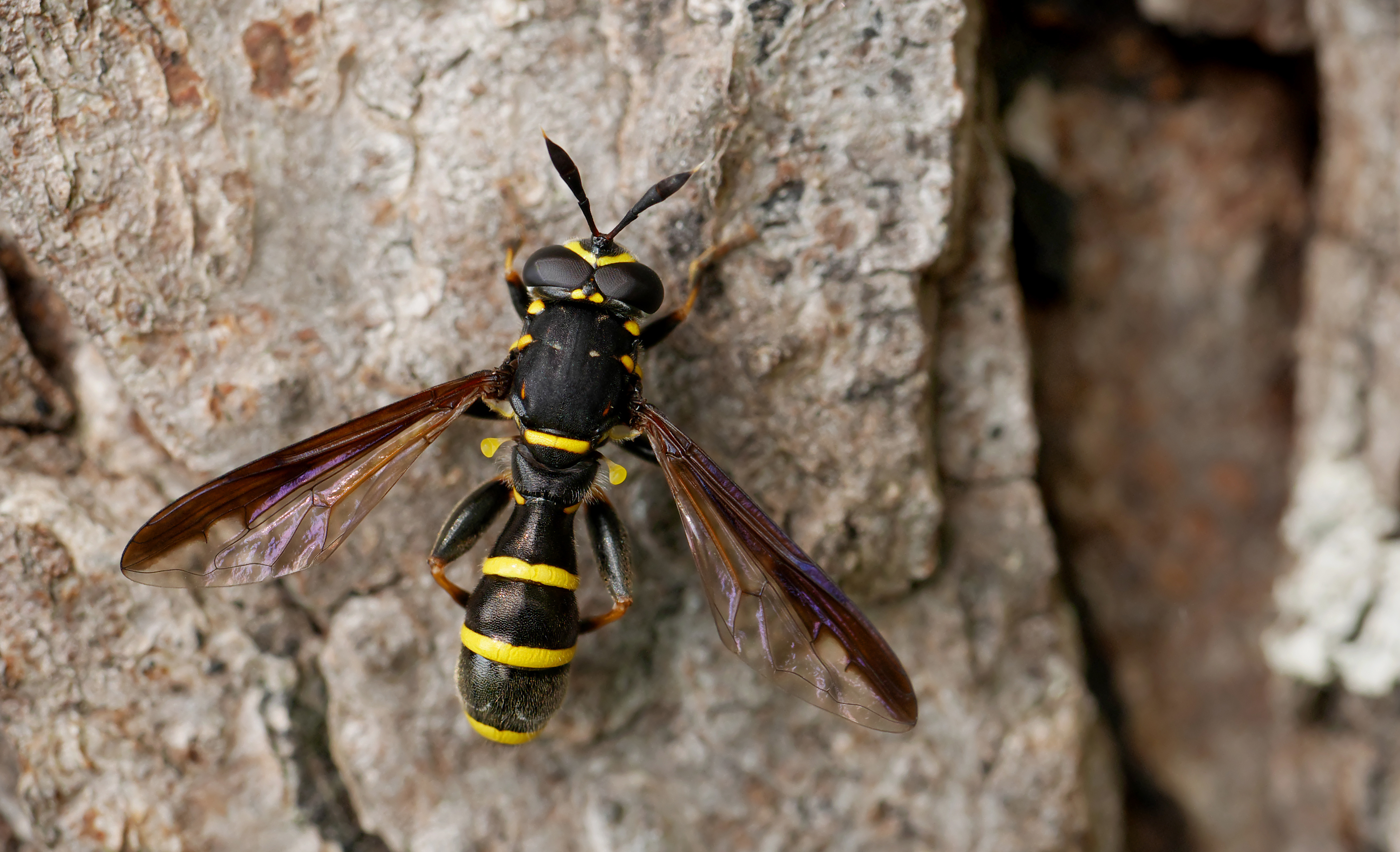
Sphiximorpha subsessilis

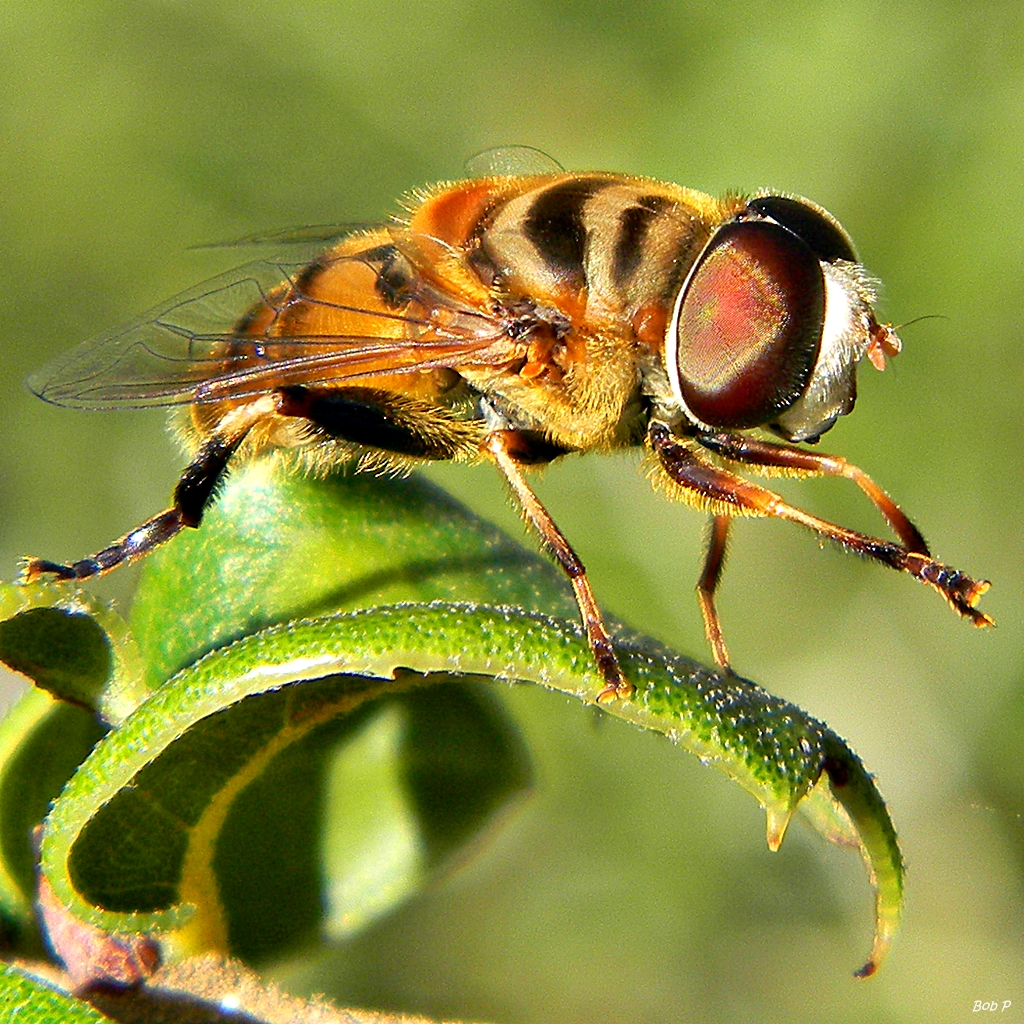
Palpada sp.

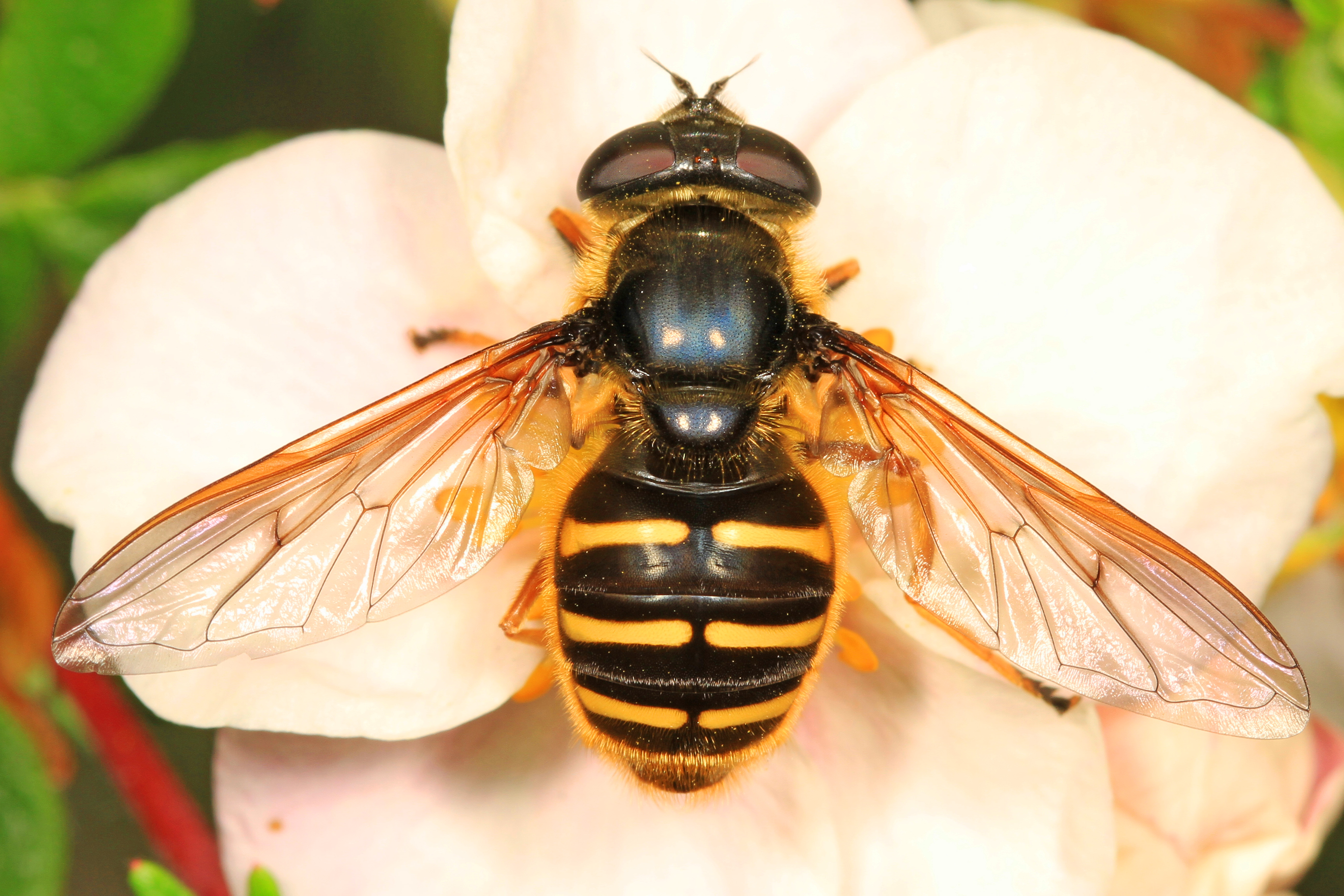
Sericomyia chalcopyga

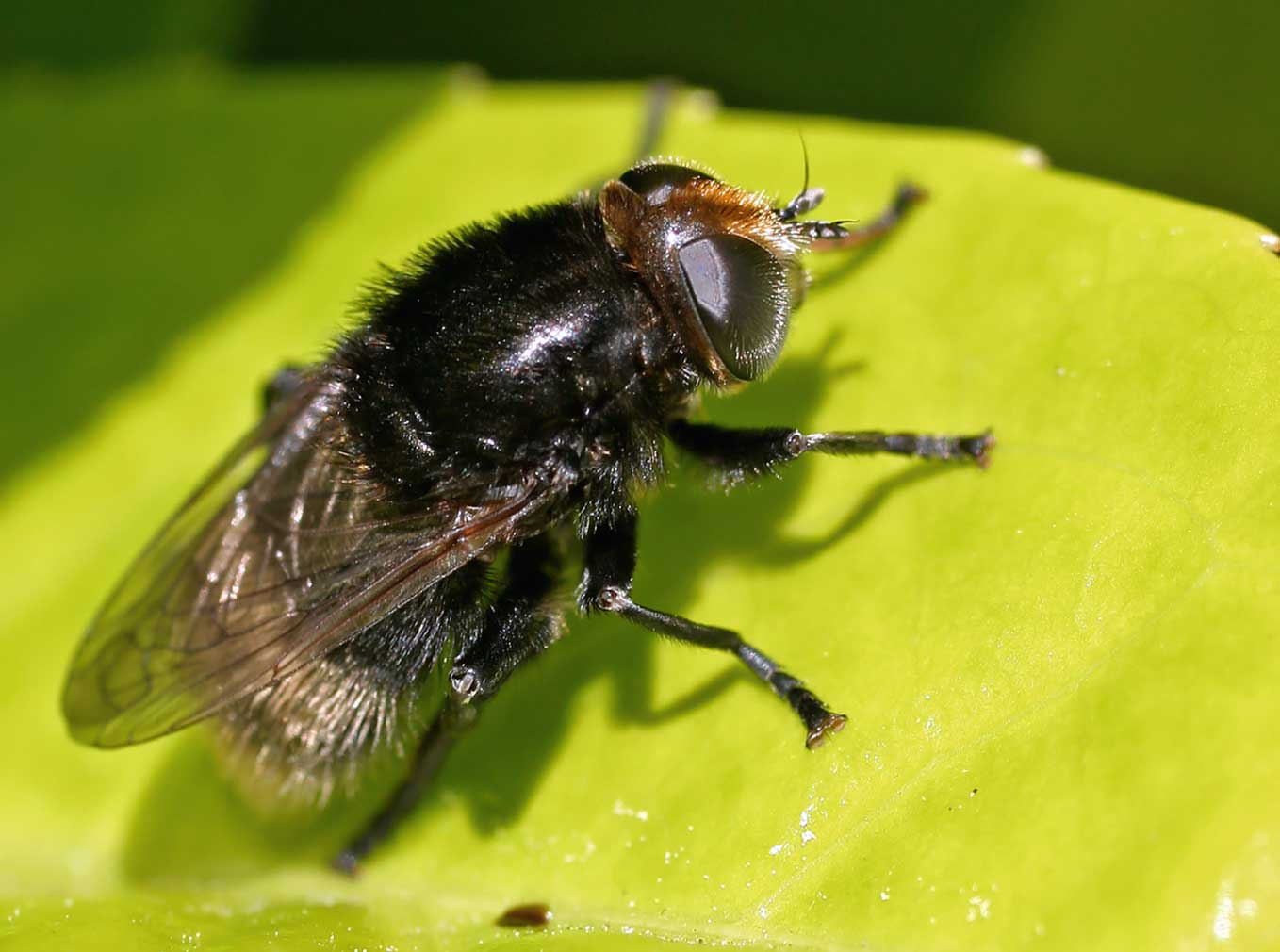
Merodon equestris actual size 12.3–17.2 mm (1/2–5/8 in)

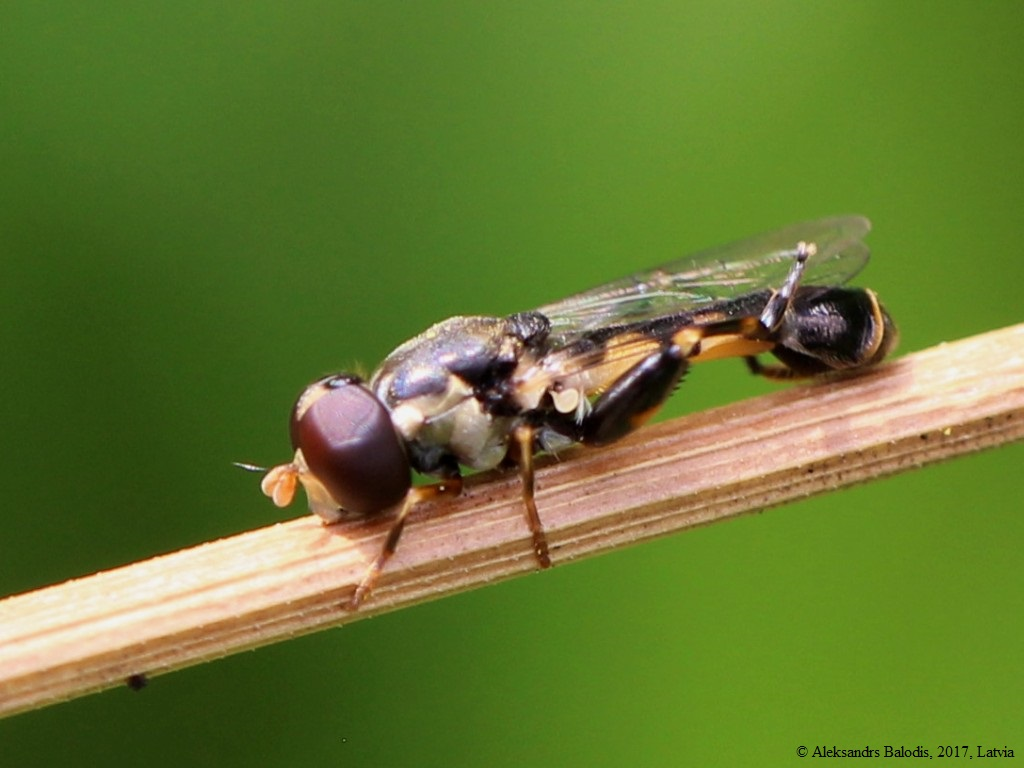
Syritta pipiens actual size 6.5–9.5 mm (1/4–3/8 in)

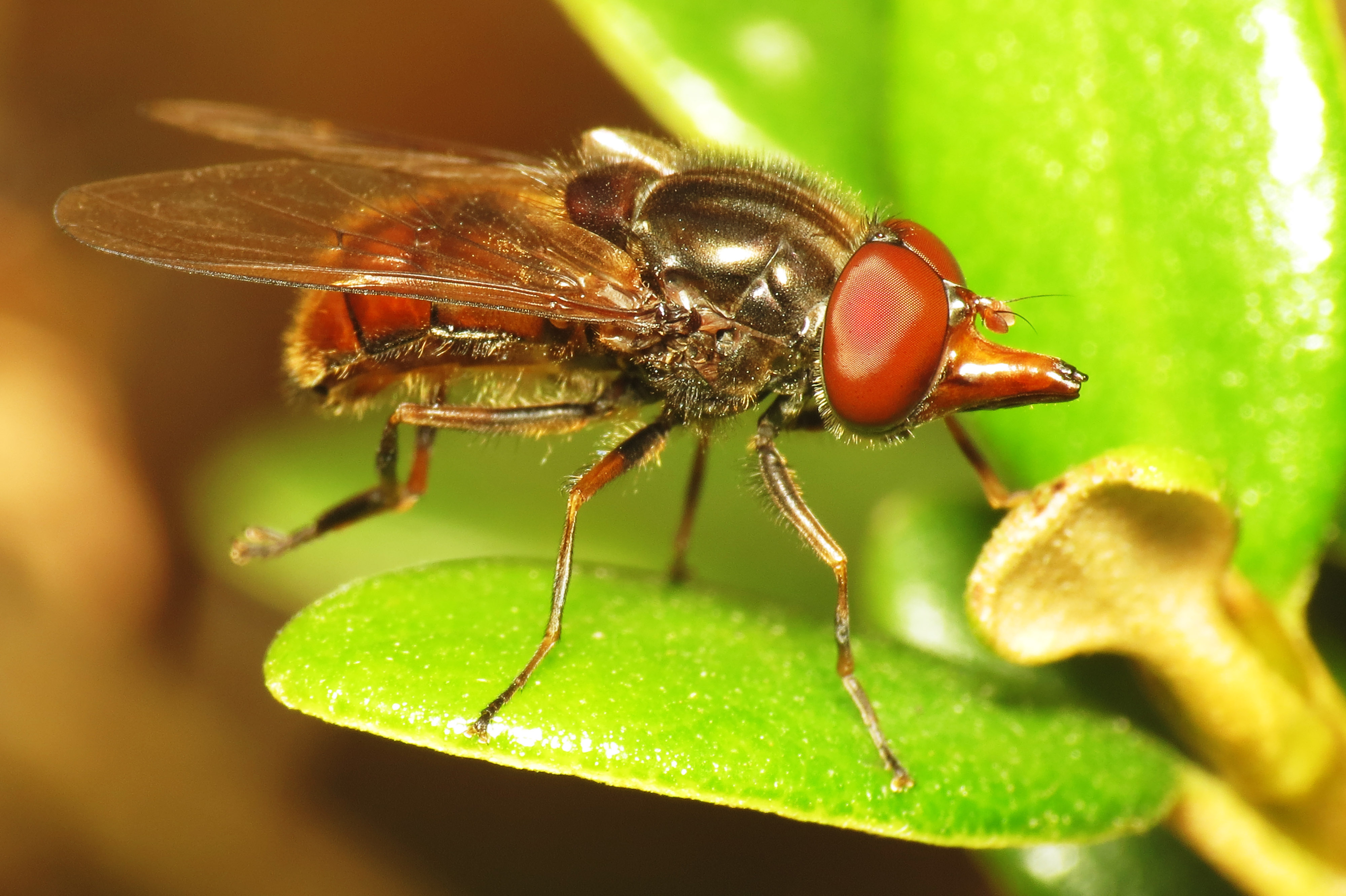
Rhingia campestris actual size 6.0–9.0 mm (1/4–3/8 in)

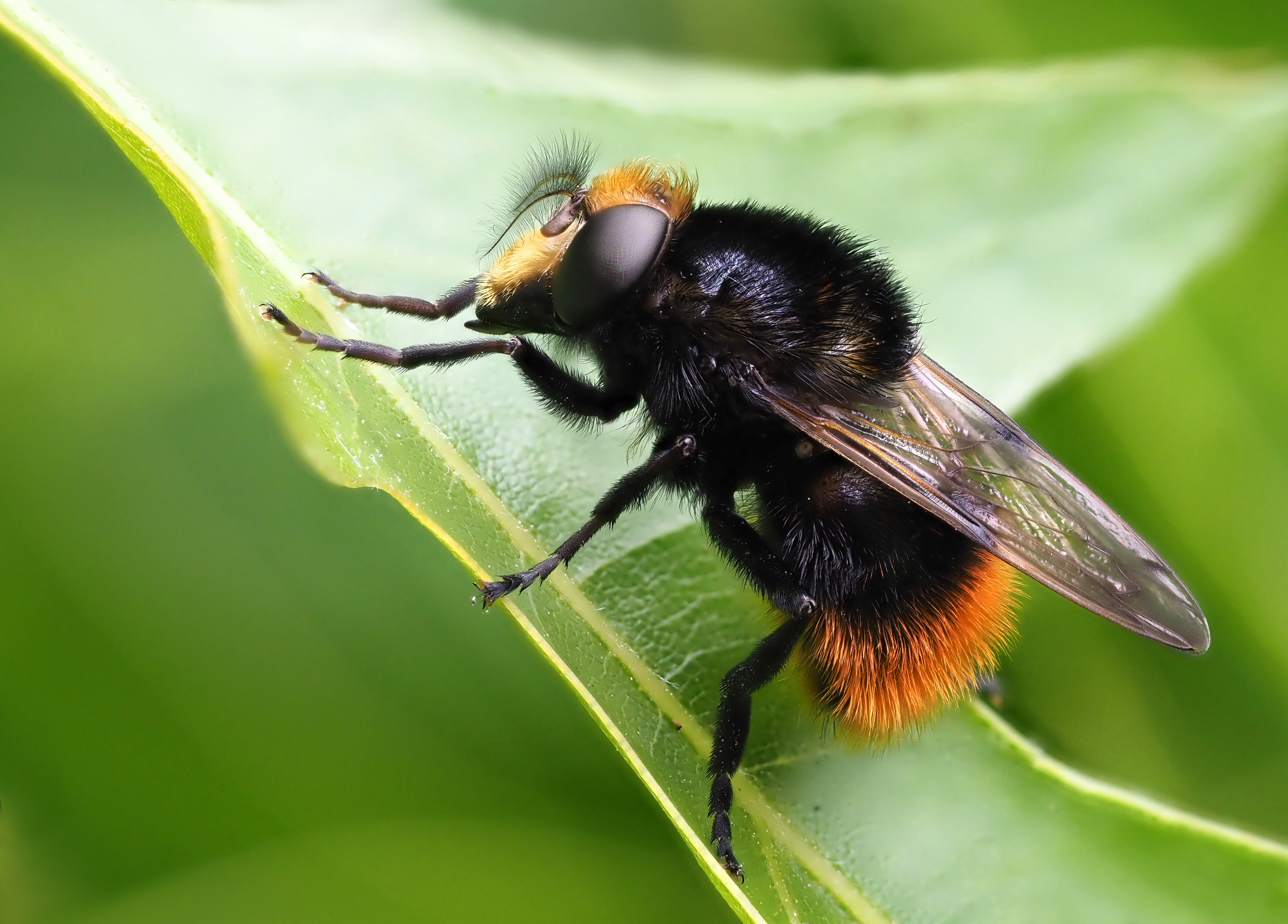
Volucelle bourdon actual size 11–17 mm (3/8–5/8 in)

== Ecology ==
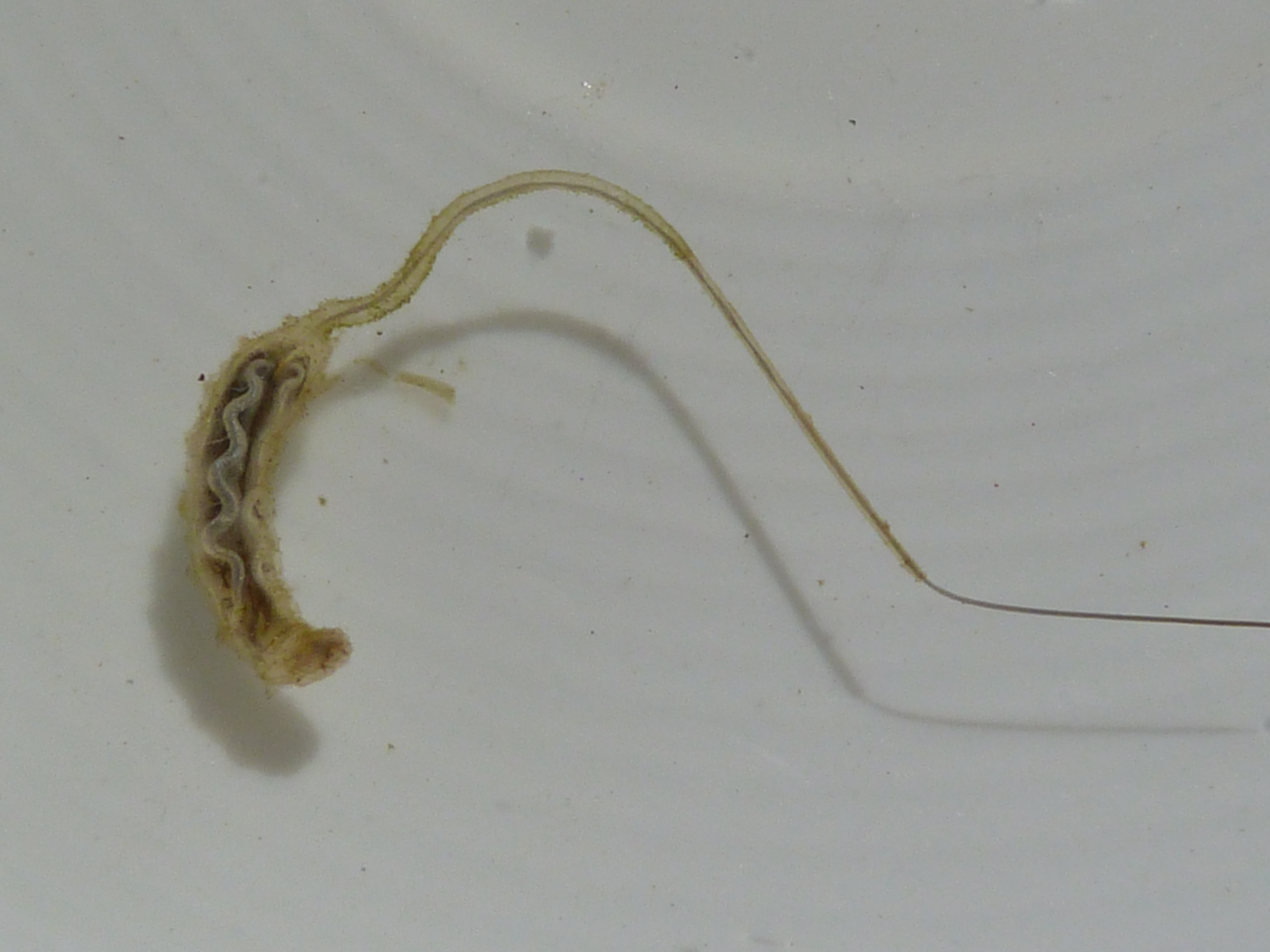
Rat-tailed maggot, the larva of the Drone fly (Eristalis tenax).

Larvae of the subfamily Eristalinae respire through a pair of posterior spiracular lobes, which are fused to form a single elongated breathing tube, characteristic of the Syrphidae. This subfamily exhibits the greatest diversity of larval habitats within the hoverflies, occurring in sap runs, under bark, rot holes, decaying organic matter such as dung and compost, and in shallow aquatic environments. Most larvae feed on decomposing organic material and act as filter feeders, helping to purify water by consuming microorganisms and detritus. In some species, such as the drone fly and rat-tailed maggot, the breathing tube functions as a fully extendable snorkel. A few species also feed on plant bulbs and may be regarded as garden pests.

Certain species in Eristalinae live as scavengers and take shelter in the remains of other insects, while others, like Volucella, are parasitoids and live in wasp or bee nests. Some other species are found to be leaf miners and tunnel inside the stems and roots of plants. Additionally, males of this subfamily typically employ dual mate-seeking strategies to find females, most commonly patrolling blossoms and waiting near potential sites where females could lay eggs.
