= Nikolaus Poda von Neuhaus =

Austrian entomologist (1723-1798)

Nikolaus Poda von Neuhaus (October 4, 1723 – April 29, 1798) is best known for his work in the field of entomology in the middle to late 18th-century.

Born October 4, 1723, in Vienna, Austria, to a noble family of Austrian descent, Nikolaus Poda von Neuhaus studied across his home country for years before working as a professor at multiple universities in both Hungary and Austria until his death on April 29, 1798.

Alongside his time as an entomologist, Nikolaus Poda von Neuhaus, also referred to as "Poda", served as a Jesuit priest as well as a mineralogist. Before working as a mathematics professor in Linz, Austria as well as Graz, Austria he joined the Jesuits in 1740. While serving as a professor of mathematics at the Jesuiten University of Graz, he facilitated the opening of the natural history museum of Austria, now called Universalmuseum Joanneum. In addition to his contribution to the Museum of Natural History, he took on the role of director of the Graz Observatory where he worked until 1760.

Following his time in his home country of Austria, Nikolaus Poda von Neuhaus relocated to Hungary where he taught at the Academy of Mining. Here, Poda worked as a professor for 13 years before returning to his home in Vienna. Shortly after his move to Hungary to work as a professor in 1761, Nikolaus Poda von Neuhaus published his novel Insecta musei Graecensis, where he described several species of insects that had never been known to science before. His contribution to entomological studies includes the discovery and naming of several species of insects, including Sphex hortensis, Sphex disparis, Vespa minima, and Apis minima, all of which were described in his book. While Nikolaus Poda von Neuhaus worked as a professor of mechanics and mathematics at the Academy of Mining in Hungary, he published several papers detailing the intricacies of machines used in local mines, though this information was forbidden by the Hungarian government to be published. The publishing of these documents resulted in Poda's early retirement from the academy of mining. Upon his retirement, he returned to his home country of Austria where he continued to work as a university professor.

After his return to Austria, he began working as a professor at the Mining Academy of Selmecbánya. During his time as a professor at the Selmecbánya in Austria, Von Neuhaus published a color-coded system in conjunction with a fellow professor, Giovanni Antonio Scopoli. This color system would later be used frequently in the field of entomology to standardize hues of colors. Other scientific uses of this color hue wheel include "the elucidation of the effects of successive contrast", or the phenomena wherein an individual observes an image is projected against a white background for an extended amount of time, the image is removed, resulting in the perception by the viewer of the same image, but in a different hue. This sort of standardization would be imperative to accurately depicting different species of flowers as well as other uses for the scientific community.

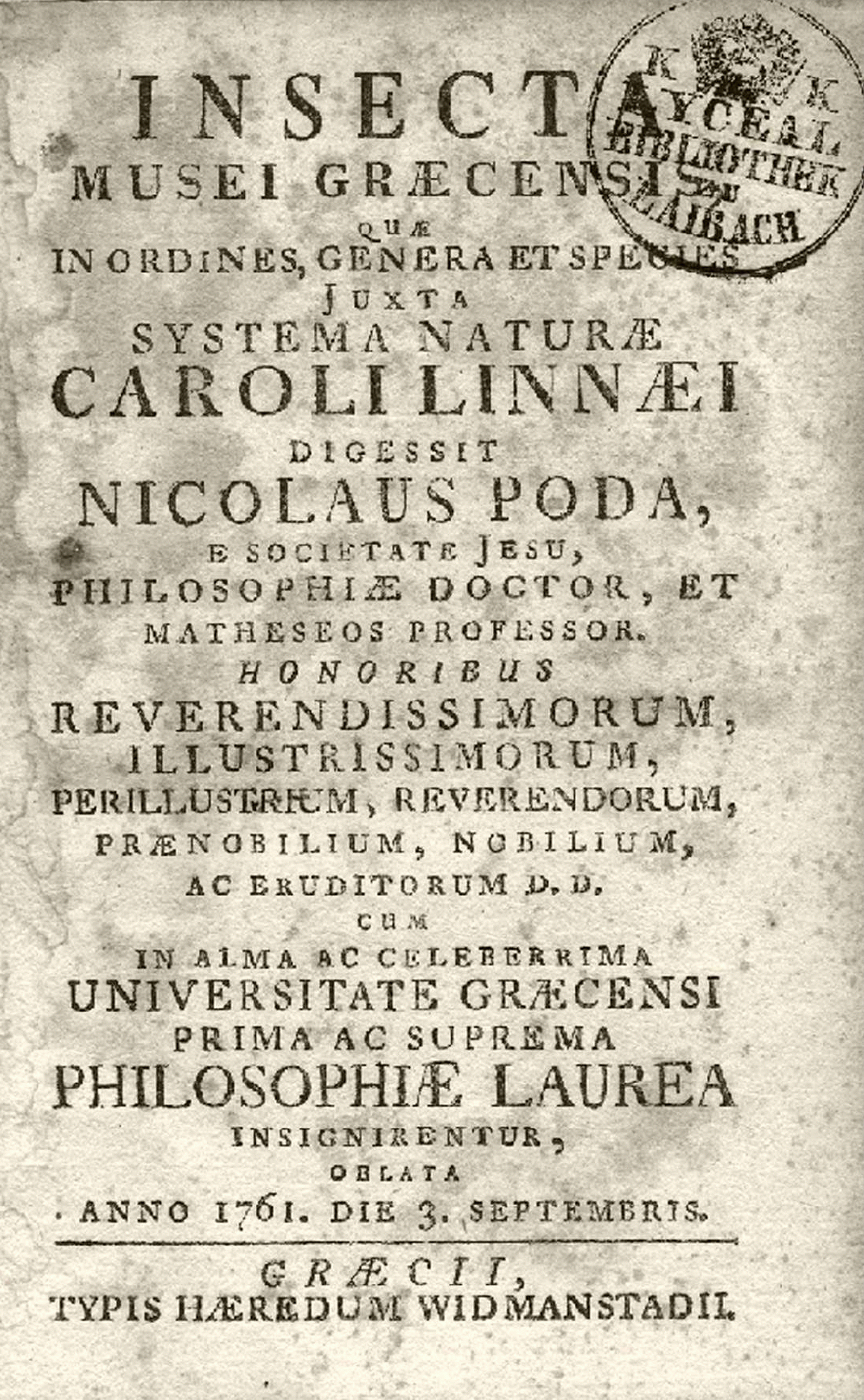
Title page of Poda's Insecta Musei Graecensis
