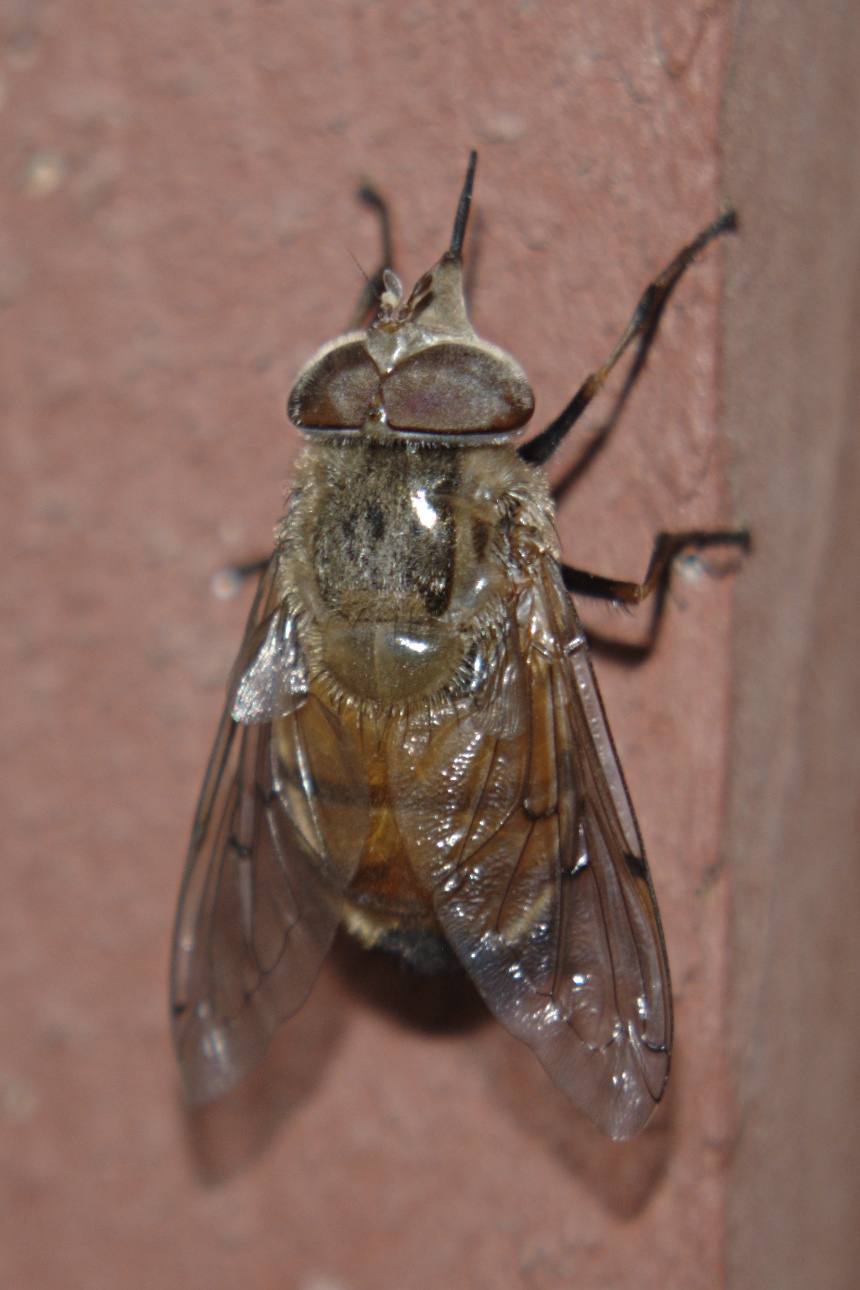
- Copestylum - Copestylum haagei

Scientific classification
- Kingdom: Animalia
- Phylum: Arthropoda
- Class: Insecta
- Order: Diptera
- Family: Syrphidae
- Subfamily: Eristalinae
- Tribe: Volucellini

= Volucellini =

Tribe of flies

The Volucellini is a tribe of hoverflies.

== List of genera ==
- Copestylum Macquart, 1846
- Graptomyza Wiedemann, 1820
- Ornidia Lepeletier & Serville, 1828
- Volucella Geoffroy, 1762
