= Diptera in the 10th edition of Systema Naturae =

Linnaean classification of flies

In the 10th edition of Systema Naturae, Carl Linnaeus classified the arthropods, including insects, arachnids and crustaceans, among his class "Insecta". Insects with simply two wings (true flies) were brought together under the name Diptera.

== Oestrus (botflies) ==
- Oestrus bovis – Hypoderma bovis
- Oestrus tarandi – Hypoderma tarandi
- Oestrus nasalis – Gasterophilus nasalis
- Oestrus haemorrhoidalis – Gasterophilus haemorrhoidalis, nose bot
- Oestrus ovis – Oestrus ovis, sheep botfly

== Tipula (craneflies) ==
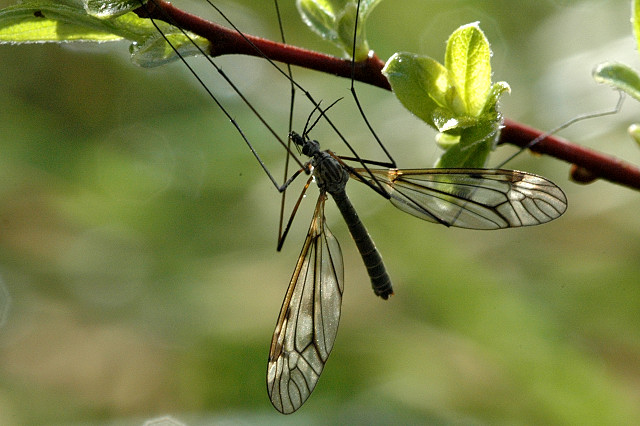
Tipula hortorum was so named in 1758.

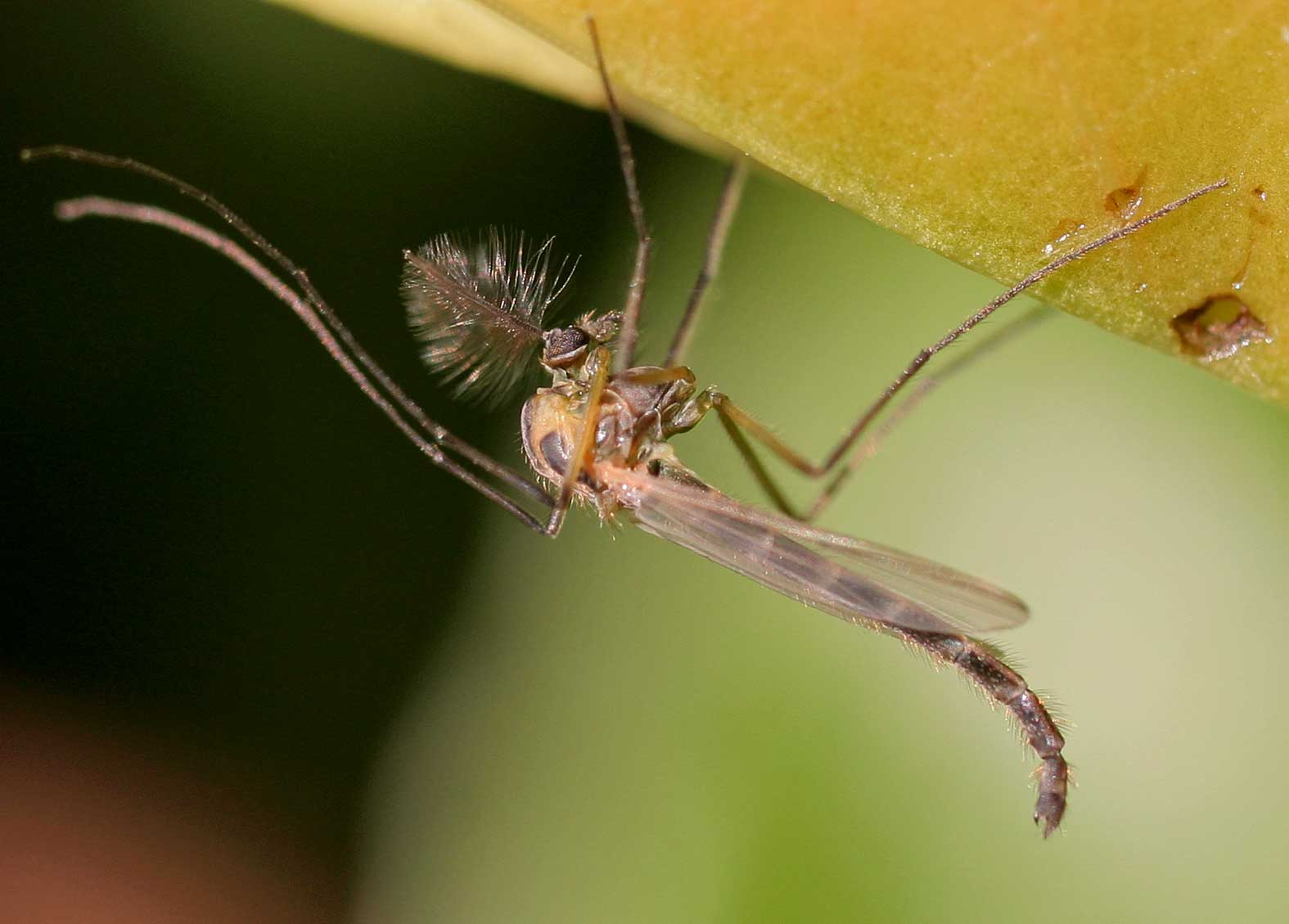
Chironomus plumosus was named Tipula plumosus in 1758.

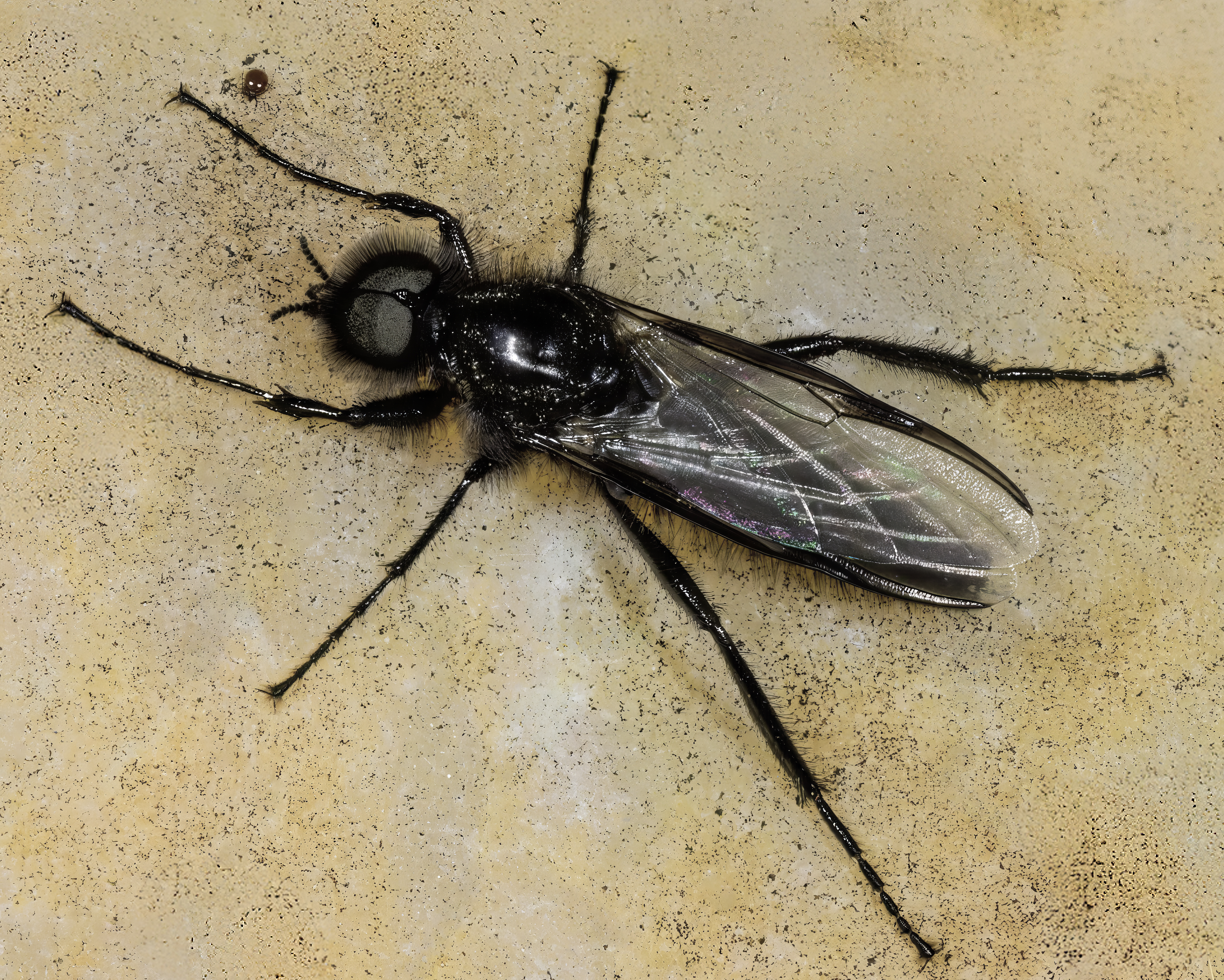
Bibio marci was named Tipula marci in 1758.

- Tipula pectinicornis – Ctenophora pectinicornis
- Tipula rivosa – Pedicia rivosa
- Tipula crocata – Nephrotoma crocata
- Tipula oleracea – Tipula oleracea
- Tipula hortorum – Tipula hortorum
- Tipula variegata – nomen oblitum for Tipula vernalis Meigen, 1804
- Tipula contaminata – Ptychoptera contaminata
- Tipula lunata – Tipula lunata
- Tipula pratensis – Nephrotoma pratensis
- Tipula terrestris – Limonia stigma (Meigen, 1818)
- Tipula cornicina – Nephrotoma cornicina
- Tipula nigra – Nigrotipula nigra
- Tipula atrata – Tanyptera atrata
- Tipula maculata – nomen oblitum for Dictenidia bimaculata (Linnaeus, 1761)
- Tipula annulata – Limonia annulata
- Tipula flavescens – Nephrotoma flavescens
- Tipula regelationis – Trichocera regelationis
- Tipula replicata – Phalacrocera replicata
- Tipula plumosa – Chironomus plumosus
- Tipula littoralis – [nomen dubium] in Chironomus
- Tipula motatrix – Cricotopus motatrix
- Tipula vibratoria – Cricotopus sylvestris
- Tipula tremula – Cricotopus tremulus
- Tipula monilis – Ablabesmyia monilis
- Tipula macrocephala – [nomen dubium]
- Tipula marci & Tipula brevicornis – Bibio marci
- Tipula putris – [nomen dubium]
- Tipula febrilis – Dilophus febrilis
- Tipula florilega – [nomen dubium]
- Tipula hortulana – Bibio hortulanus
- Tipula phalaenoides – Psychoda phalaenoides
- Tipula notata – Scatopse notata
- Tipula juniperina – Oligotrophus juniperinus
- Tipula palustris – Cecidomyia palustris
- Tipula longicornis – [nomen dubium]
- Tipula pinnicornis – [nomen dubium]

== Musca (houseflies & hoverflies) ==
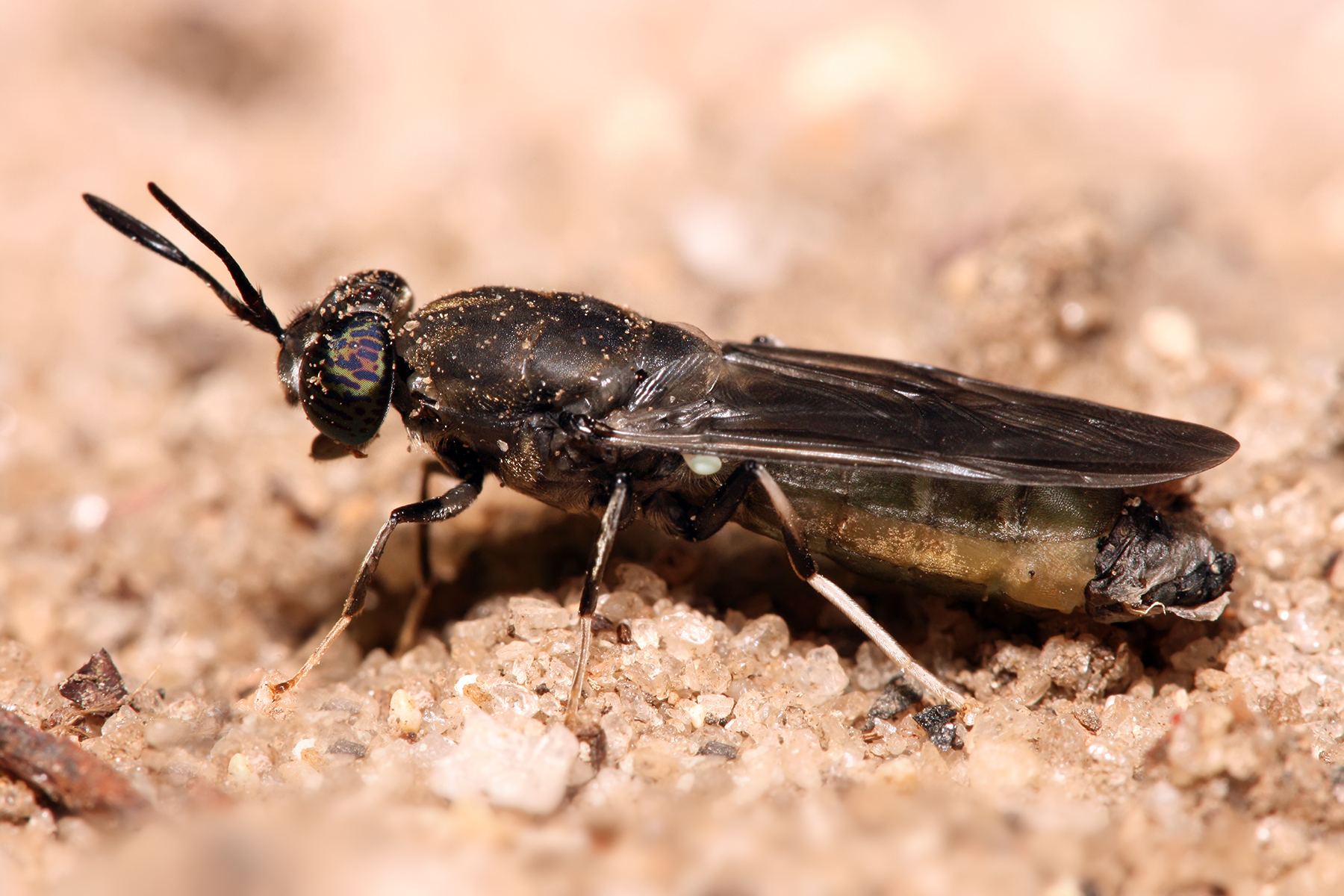
Hermetia illucens was named Musca illucens in 1758.

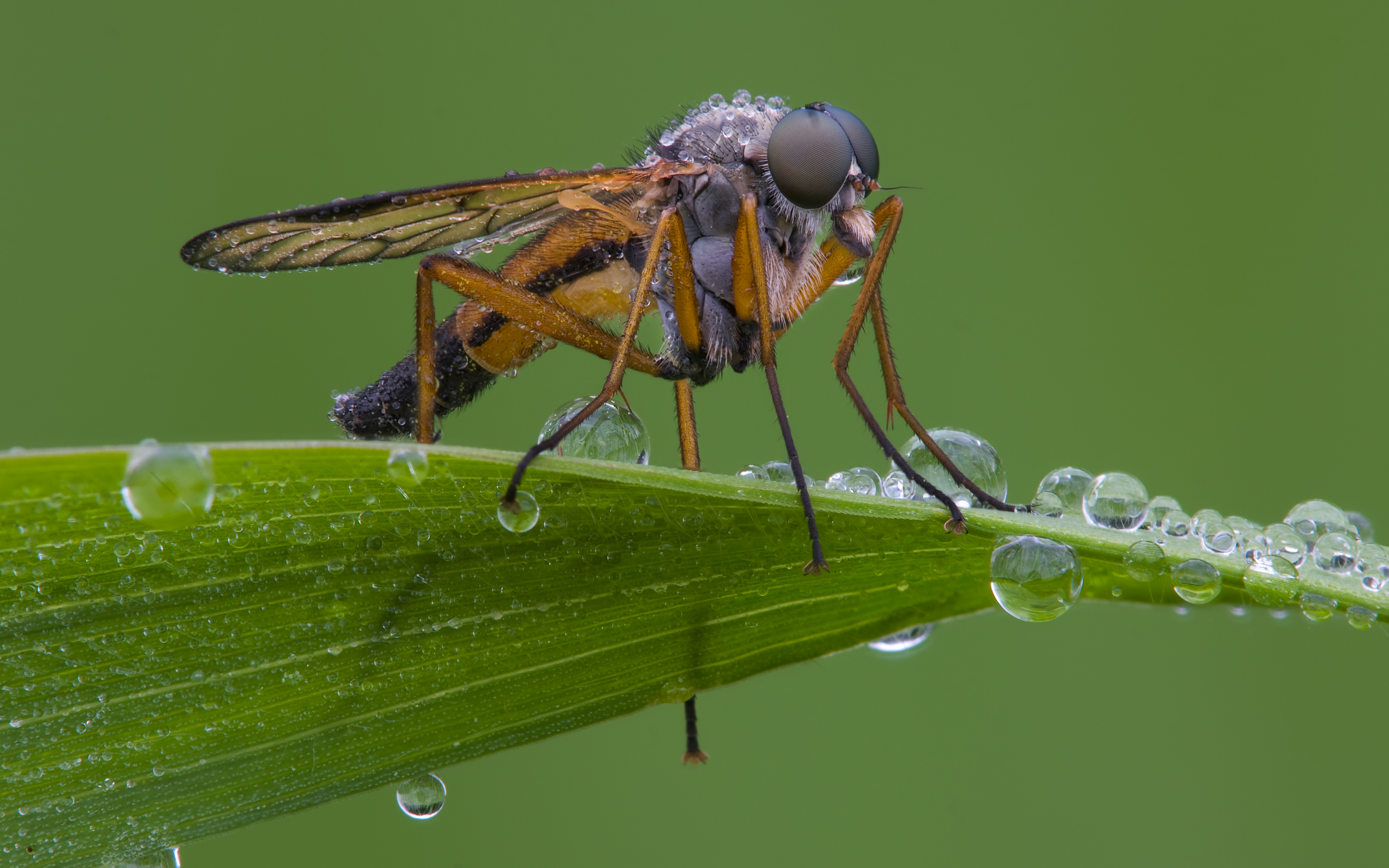
Rhagio scolopaceus was named Musca scolopacea in 1758.

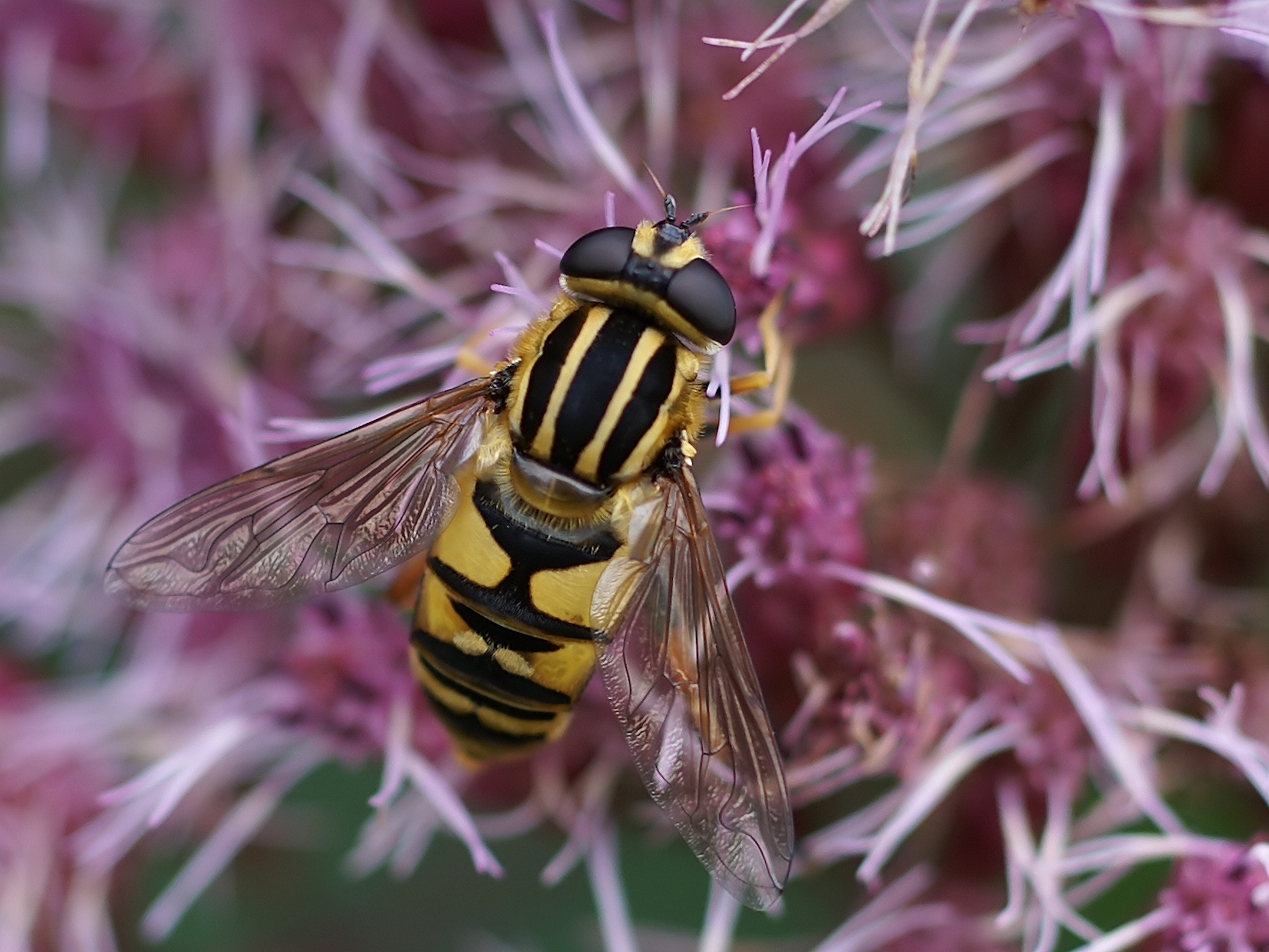
Helophilus pendulus was named Musca pendula in 1758.

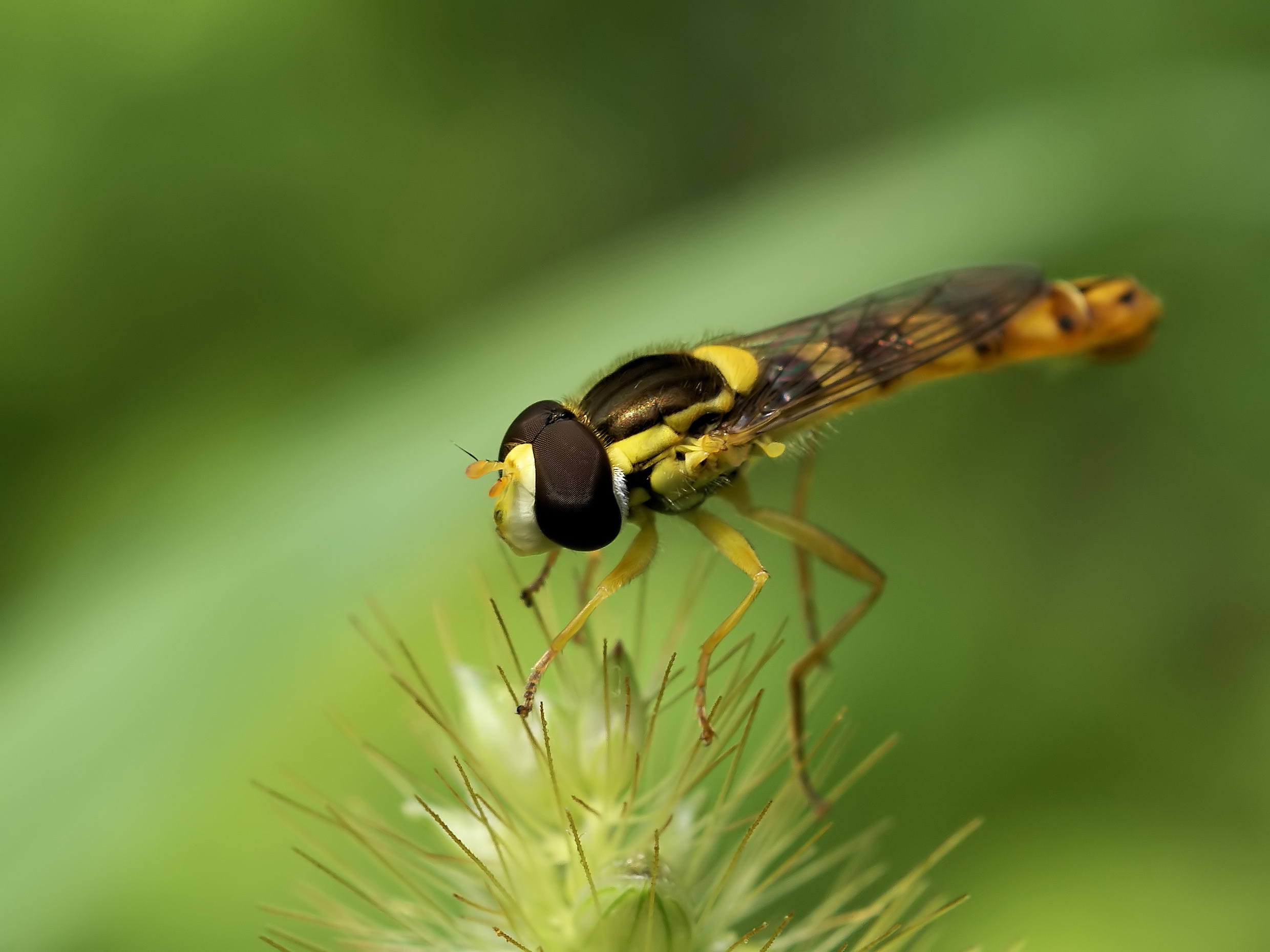
Sphaerophoria scripta was named Musca scripta in 1758.

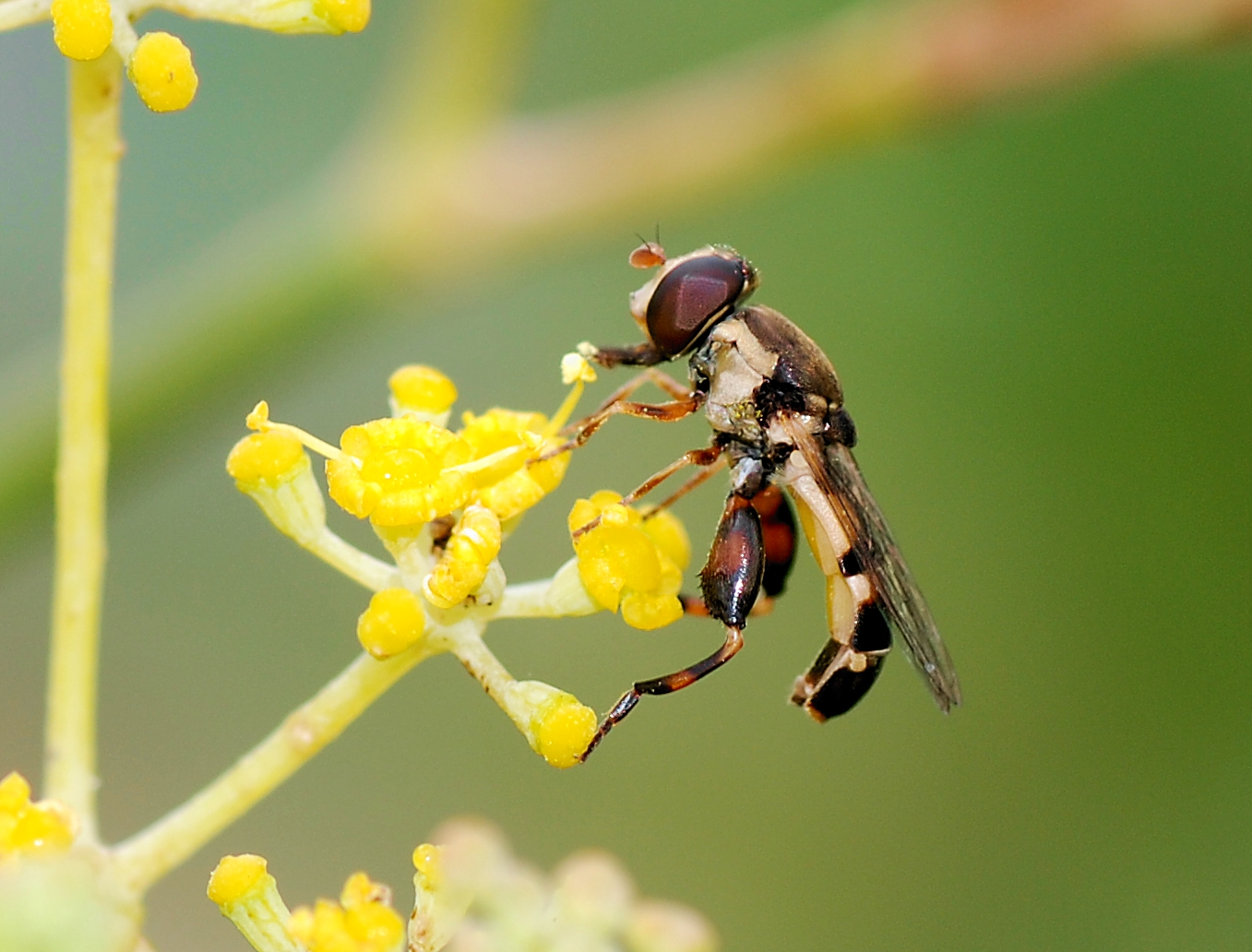
Syritta pipiens was named Musca pipiens in 1758.

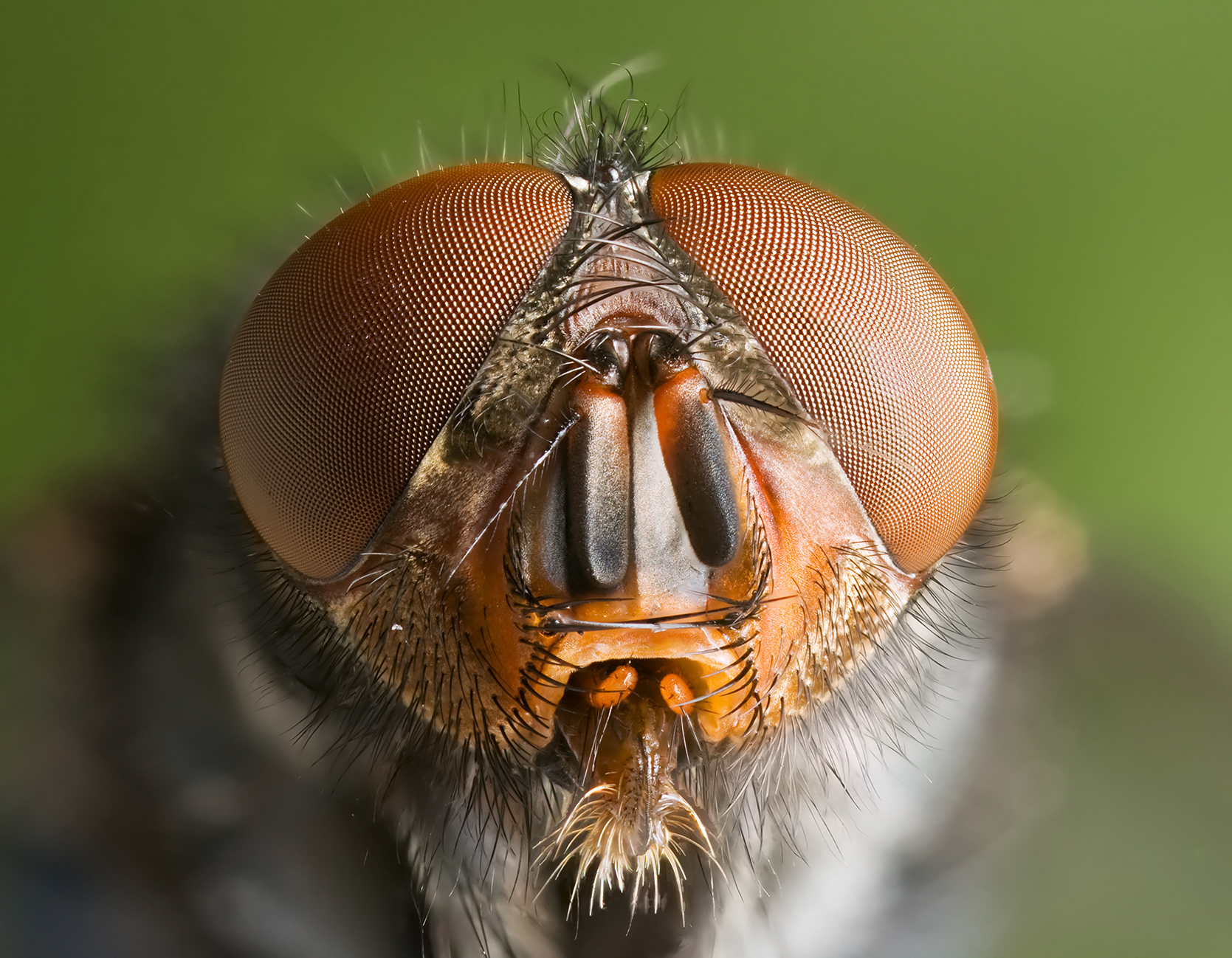
Calliphora vomitoria was named Musca vomitoria in 1758.

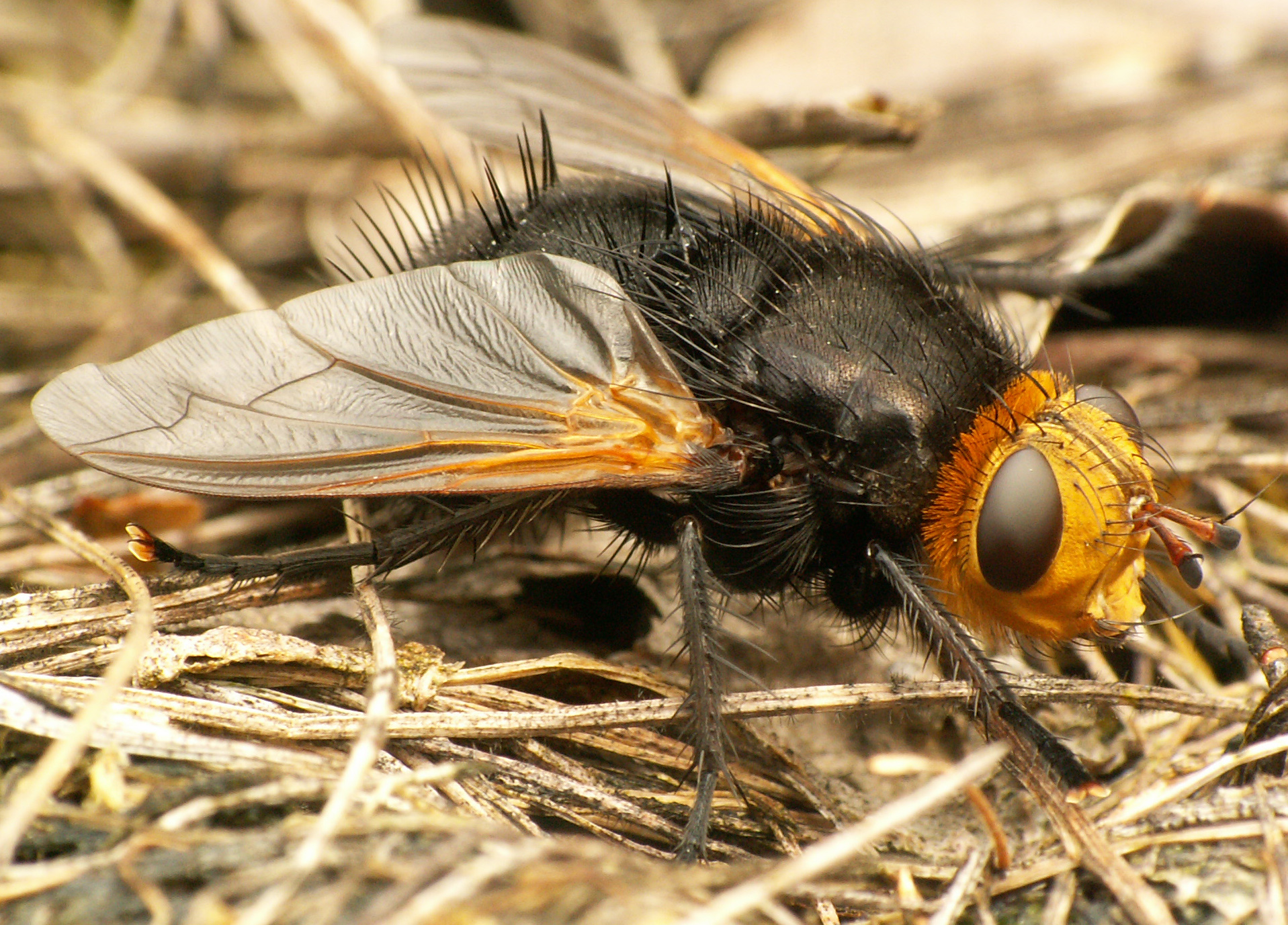
Tachina grossa was named Musca grossa in 1758.

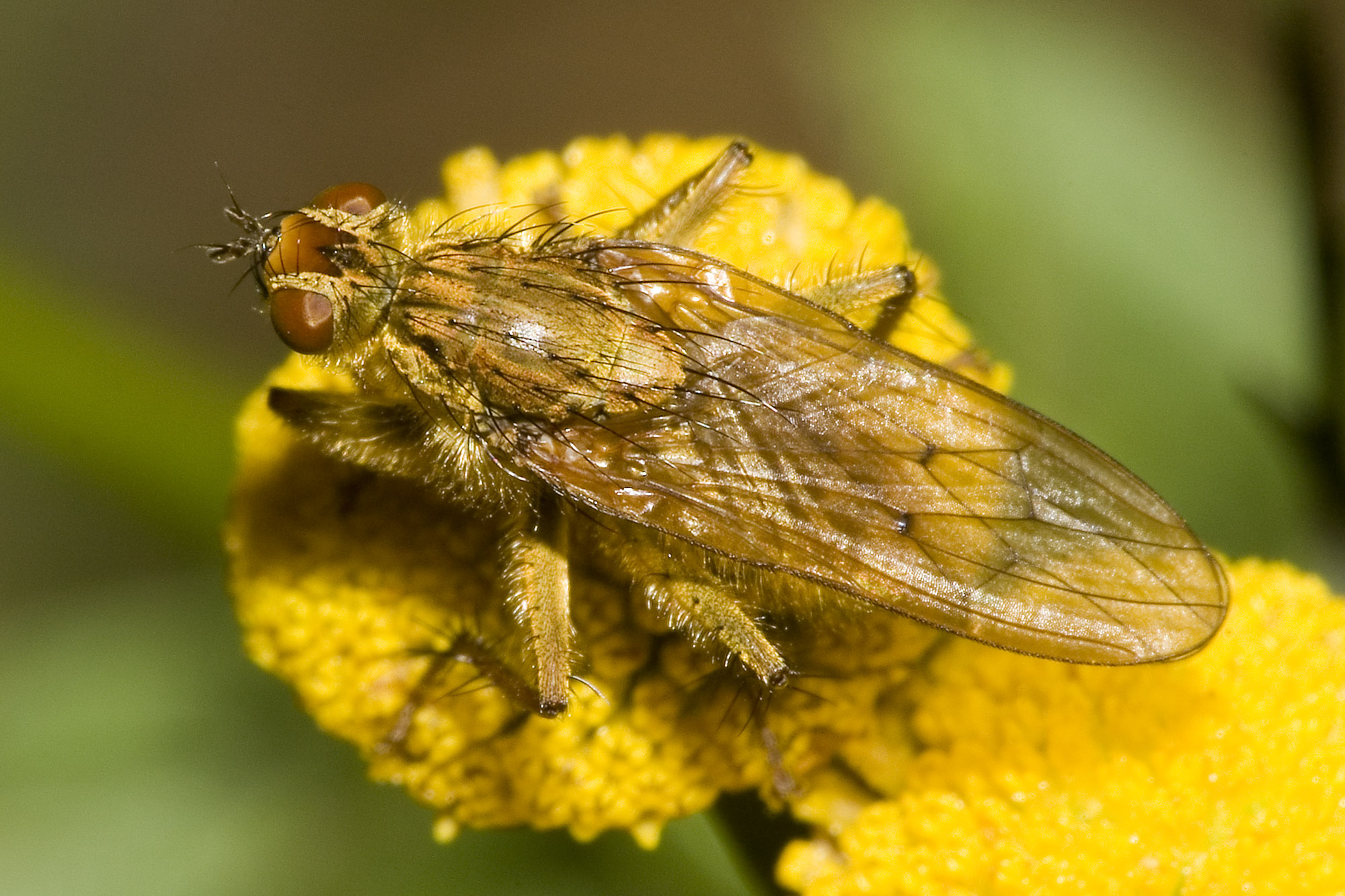
Scathophaga stercoraria was named Musca stercoraria in 1758.

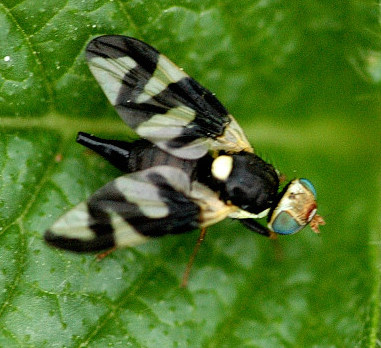
Urophora cardui was named Musca cardui in 1758.

- Musca plebeja – Thereva plebeja
- Musca illucens – Hermetia illucens
- Musca chamaeleon – Stratiomys chamaeleon, clubbed general
- Musca microleon – Odontomyia microleon
- Musca hydroleon – Odontomyia hydroleon
- Musca pantherina – Nemotelus pantherinus
- Musca morio – Hemipenthes morio
- Musca maura – Hemipenthes maura
- Musca hottentotta – Villa hottentotta
- Musca scolopacea – Rhagio scolopaceus, downlooker snipe fly
- Musca vermileo – Vermileo vermileo
- Musca tringaria – Rhagio tringarius
- Musca conopsoides – Ceriana conopsoides
- Musca bombylans – Volucella bombylans
- Musca mystacea – Mesembrina mystacea
- Musca lappona – Sericomyia lappona
- Musca pendula – Helophilus pendulus
- Musca florea – Myathropa florea
- Musca nemorum – Eristalis nemorum
- Musca arbustorum – Eristalis arbustorum
- Musca tenax – Eristalis tenax, drone fly
- Musca intricaria – Eristalis intricaria
- Musca oestracea – Eristalis oestracea
- Musca fallax – Blera fallax, pine hover fly
- Musca lucorum – Leucozona lucorum
- Musca sylvarum – Xylota sylvarum
- Musca bicincta – Chrysotoxum bicinctum
- Musca arcuata – Chrysotoxum arcuatum
- Musca mutabilis – Microdon mutabilis
- Musca ichneumonea – Loxocera ichneumonea
- Musca diophthalma – Spilomyia diophthalma
- Musca vespiformis – Temnostoma vespiforme
- Musca festiva – Chrysotoxum festivum
- Musca erratica – Megasyrphus erraticus
- Musca glaucia – Leucozona glaucia
- Musca noctiluca – Pipiza noctiluca
- Musca gibbosa – Ogcodes gibbosus
- Musca ribesii – Syrphus ribesii
- Musca pyrastri – Scaeva pyrastri
- Musca transfuga – Anasimyia transfuga
- Musca menthastri – Sphaerophoria menthastri
- Musca scripta – Sphaerophoria scripta
- Musca mellina – Melanostoma mellinum
- Musca pipiens – Syritta pipiens, thick-legged hoverfly
- Musca segnis – Xylota segnis
- Musca femorata – Chalcosyrphus femoratus
- Musca inanis – Volucella inanis
- Musca pellucens – Volucella pellucens
- Musca meridiana – Mesembrina meridiana, noon fly
- Musca caesar – Lucilia caesar, common green bottle
- Musca cadaverina – Pyrellia cadaverina
- Musca vomitoria – Calliphora vomitoria, blue bottle fly
- Musca carnaria – Sarcophaga carnaria, common flesh fly
- Musca domestica – Musca domestica, housefly
- Musca sepulchralis – Eristalinus sepulchralis
- Musca grossa – Tachina grossa, giant tachinid fly
- Musca rotundata – Gymnosoma rotundatum
- Musca larvarum – Exorista larvarum
- Musca radicum – Delia radicum, cabbage fly
- Musca lateralis – Fannia canicularis, lesser house fly
- Musca cemiteriorum – Chrysogaster cemiteriorum
- Musca pluvialis – Anthomyia pluvialis
- Musca fenestralis – Scenopinus fenestralis
- Musca roralis & Musca grossificationis – Melanophora roralis
- Musca serrata – Heleomyza serrata
- Musca cellaris – nomen oblitum of Drosophila melanogaster
- Musca meteorica – Hydrotaea meteorica
- Musca putris – Themira putris
- Musca frit – Oscinella frit
- Musca leprae – Hippelates leprae
- Musca cupraria – Sargus cuprarius
- Musca polita – Microchrysa polita
- Musca viduata – Pipizella viduata
- Musca pubera – Cordilura pubera
- Musca petronella – Calobatella petronella
- Musca ungulata – Dolichopus ungulatus
- Musca aequinoctialis – [nomen dubium]
- Musca cibaria – Compsobata cibaria
- Musca scybalaria – Scathophaga scybalaria
- Musca stercoraria – Scathophaga stercoraria, common yellow dung fly
- Musca fimetaria – Psila fimetaria
- Musca parietina – Oxyna parietina
- Musca umbrarum – Dictya umbrarum
- Musca saltuum – Palloptera saltuum
- Musca vibrans – Seioptera vibrans
- Musca cynipsea – Sepsis cynipsea
- Musca flava – Chyromya flava
- Musca aestuans – [nomen dubium]
- Musca serratulae – Terellia serratulae
- Musca arnicae – Tephritis arnicae
- Musca hyoscyami – Tephritis hyoscyami
- Musca germinationis – Opomyza germinationis
- Musca urticae – Ceroxys urticae
- Musca cerasi – Rhagoletis cerasi, cherry fruit fly
- Musca heraclii – Euleia heraclei
- Musca cardui – Urophora cardui, Canada thistle gall fly
- Musca solstitialis – Urophora solstitialis
- Musca florescentiae – dubious synonym of Terellia ruficauda (Fabricius, 1794)
- Musca frondescentiae – Herina frondescentiae

== Tabanus (horse flies) ==
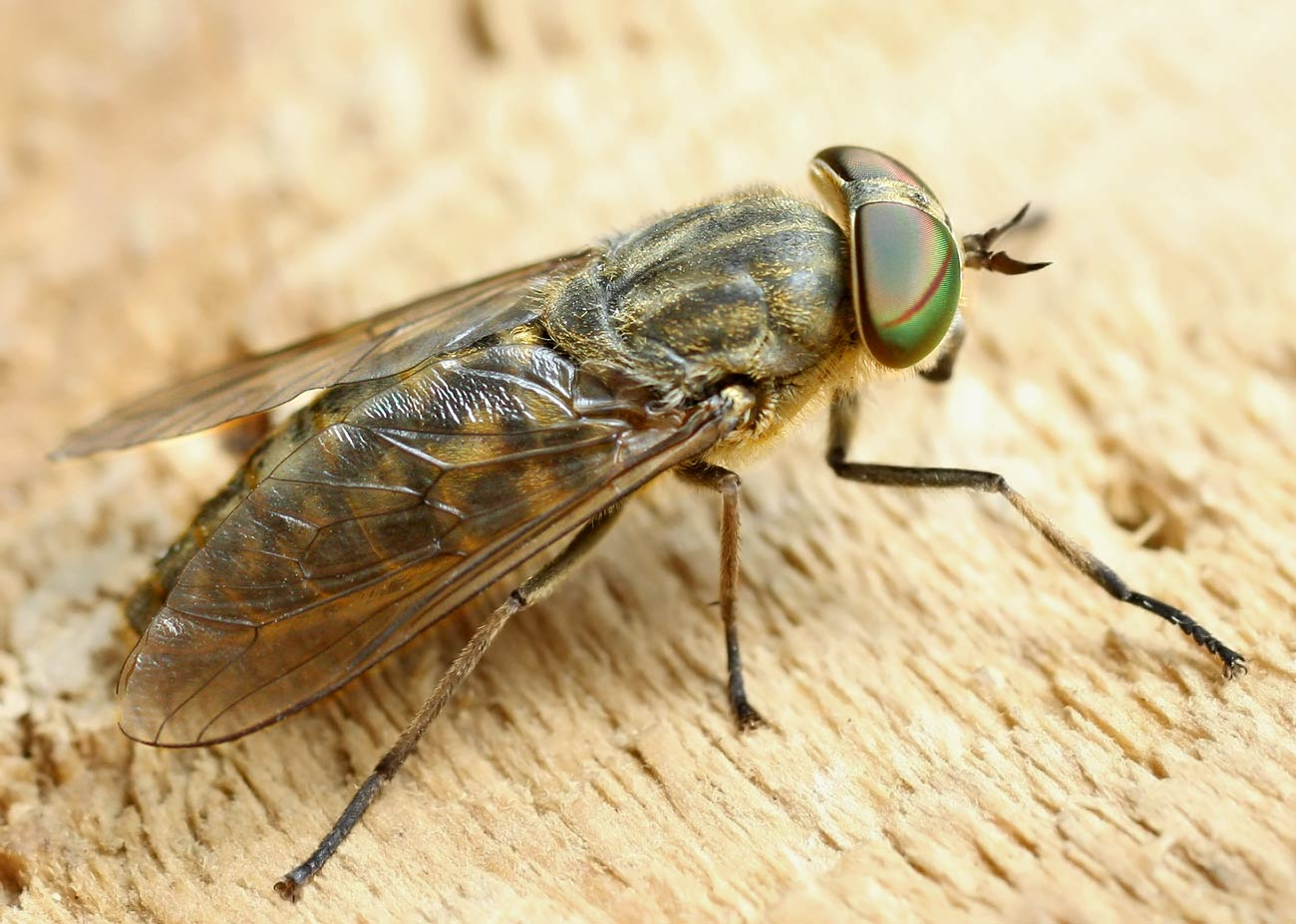
Tabanus bromius was so named in 1758.

- Tabanus bovinus – Tabanus bovinus
- Tabanus calens – Tabanus calens
- Tabanus tarandinus – Hybomitra tarandina
- Tabanus exaestuans – Leucotabanus exaestuans
- Tabanus fervens – Phaeotabanus fervens
- Tabanus mexicanus – Chlorotabanus mexicanus
- Tabanus bromius – Tabanus bromius, band-eyed brown horsefly
- Tabanus occidentalis – Tabanus occidentalis
- Tabanus tropicus – Hybomitra tropica
- Tabanus antarcticus – Tabanus antarcticus
- Tabanus pluvialis – Haematopota pluvialis
- Tabanus caecutiens – Chrysops caecutiens

== Culex (mosquitoes) ==
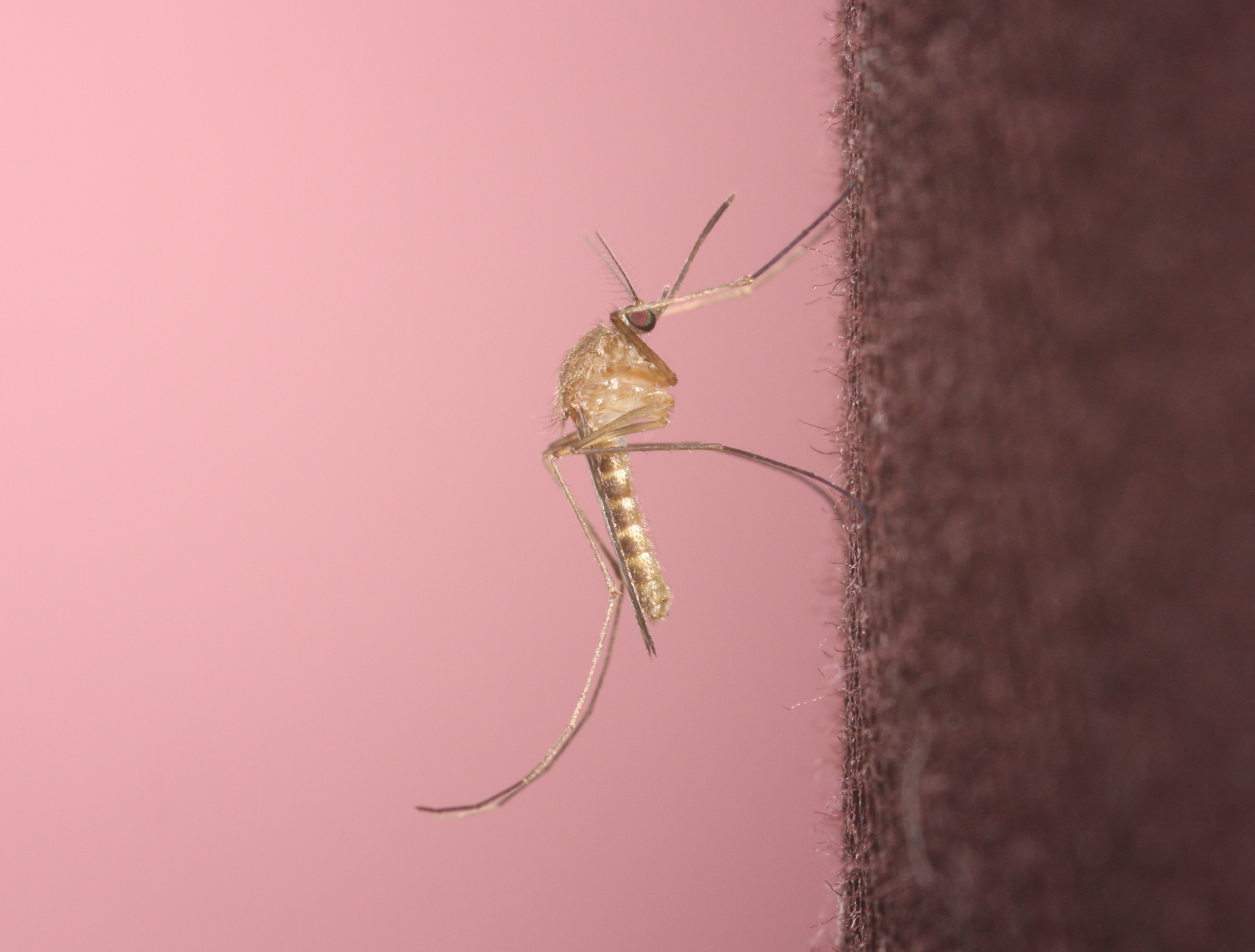
Culex pipiens was named Culex pipens and Culex bifurcatus in 1758.

- Culex pipiens & Culex bifurcatus – Culex pipiens, northern house mosquito
- Culex pulicaris – Culicoides pulicaris
- Culex reptans – Simulium reptans
- Culex equinus – Simulium equinum
- Culex stercoreus – [nomen dubium]

== Empis (dance flies) ==
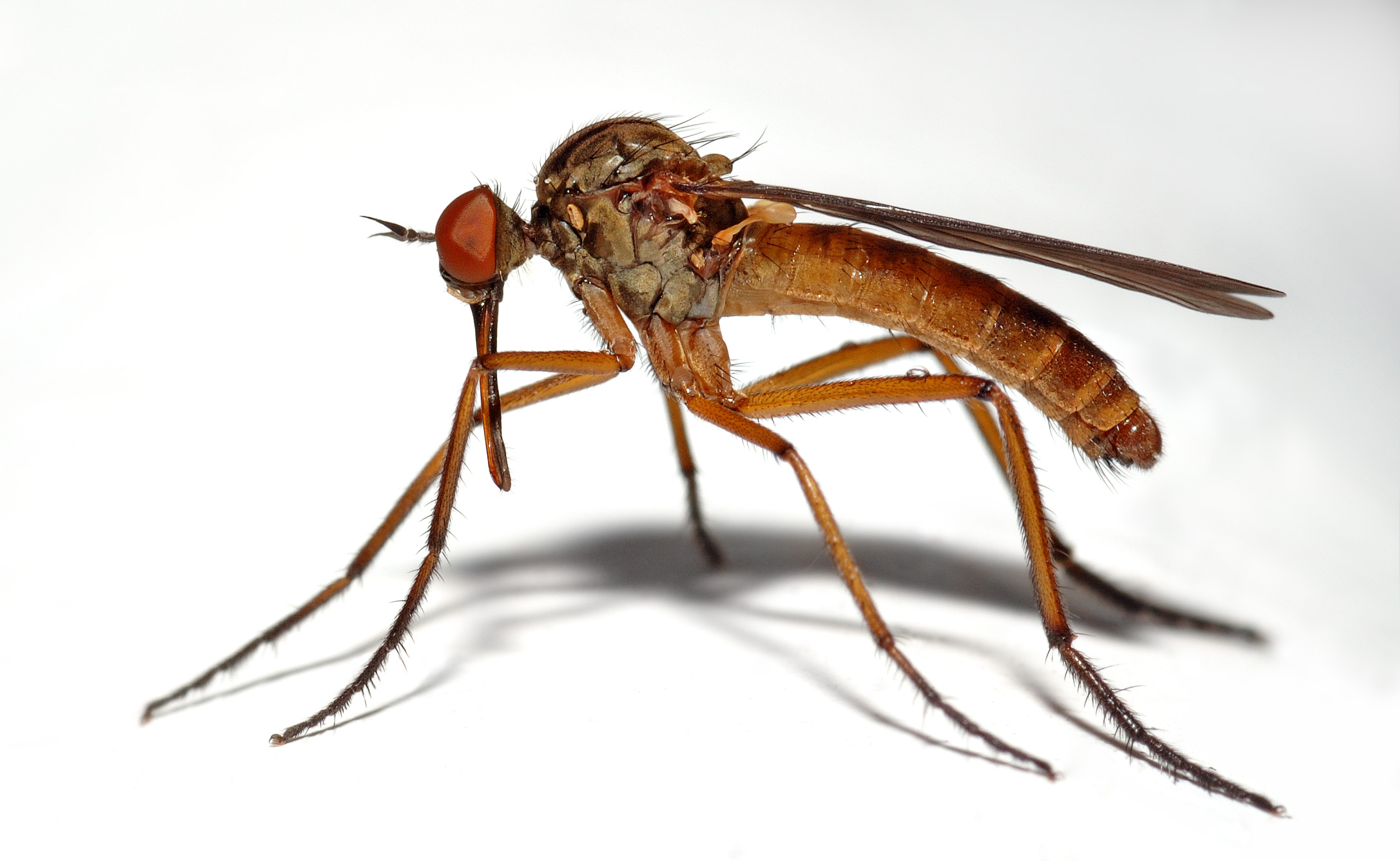
Empis livida was named Empis livida and Asilus tipuloides in 1758.

- Empis borealis – Empis borealis
- Empis pennipes – Empis pennipes
- Empis livida – Empis livida

== Conops (thick-headed flies) ==
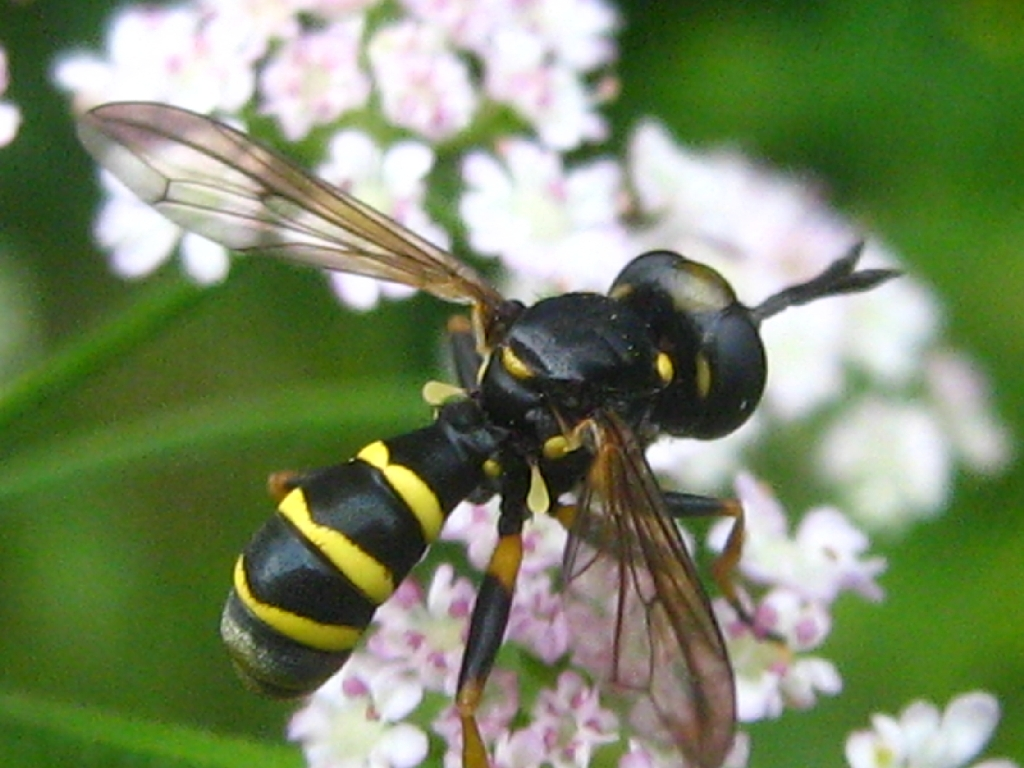
Conops flavipes was so named in 1758.

- Conops rostrata – Rhingia rostrata
- Conops calcitrans – Stomoxys calcitrans, stable fly
- Conops irritans – Haematobia irritans, horn fly
- Conops macrocephala – Physocephala nigra
- Conops flavipes – Conops flavipes
- Conops buccata – Myopa buccata

== Asilus (robber flies) ==
- Asilus maurus – [nomen dubium]
- Asilus barbarus – Asilus barbarus
- Asilus crabroniformis – Asilus crabroniformis
- Asilus gibbosus – Laphria gibbosa
- Asilus ater – Andrenosoma atrum
- Asilus gilvus – Choerades gilva
- Asilus marginatus – Choerades marginata
- Asilus germanicus – Pamponerus germanicus
- Asilus forcipatus – dubious synonyms of Dysmachus picipes (Meigen, 1820)
- Asilus tipuloides – synonym of Empis livida Linnaeus, 1758
- Asilus oelandicus – Dioctria oelandica
- Asilus morio – [nomen dubium]

== Bombylius (bee flies) ==
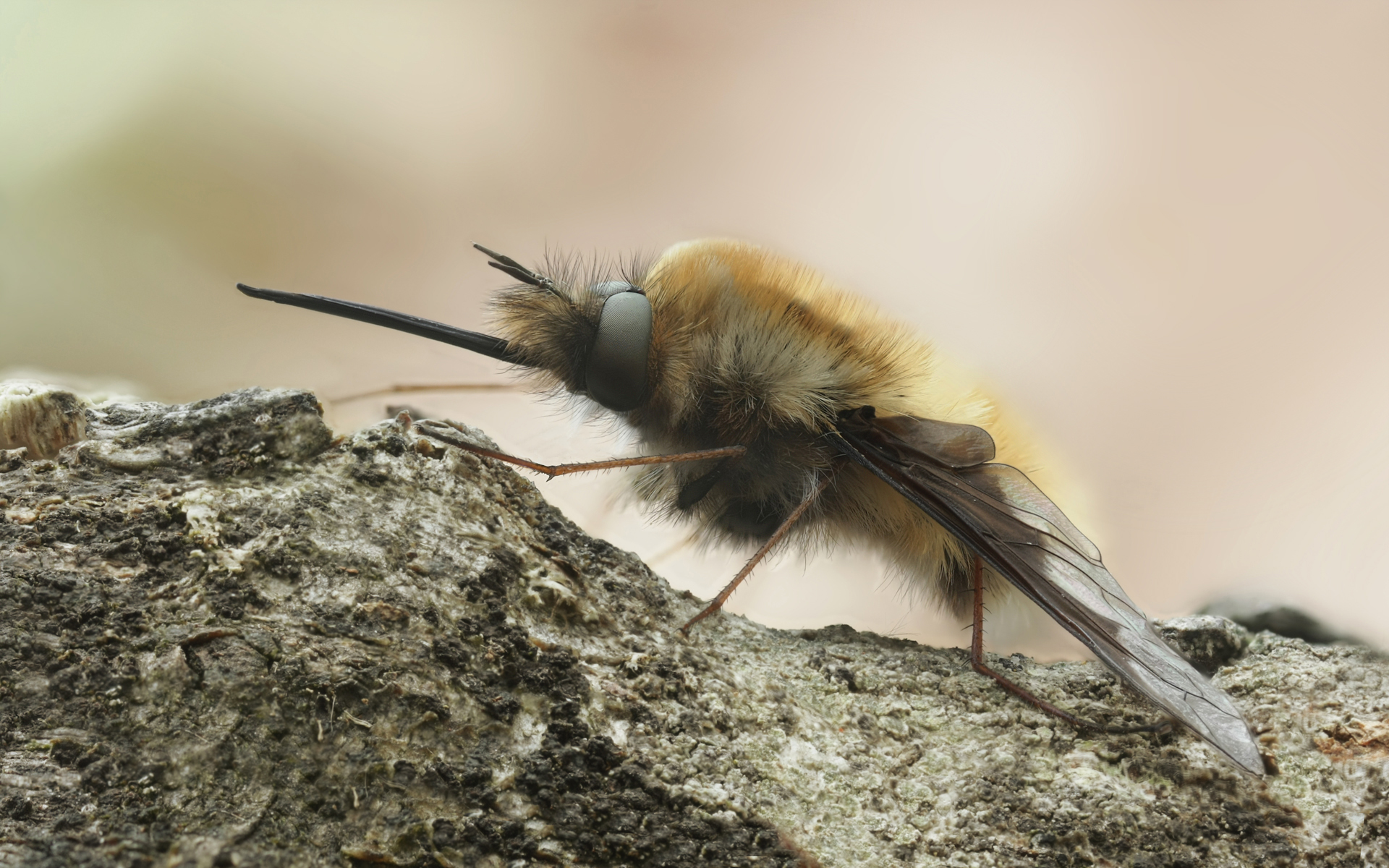
Bombylius major was so named in 1758.

- Bombylius major – Bombylius major, large beefly
- Bombylius medius – Bombylius medius
- Bombylius minor – Bombylius minor

== Hippobosca (louse flies) ==
- Hippobosca equina – Hippobosca equina, forest fly
- Hippobosca avicularia – Ornithomya avicularia
- Hippobosca hirundinis – Crataerina hirundinis
- Hippobosca ovina – Melophagus ovinus, sheep ked
