= Insecta in the 10th edition of Systema Naturae =

In the 10th edition of Systema Naturae of 1758–1759, Carl Linnaeus classified the arthropods, including insects, arachnids and crustaceans, among his class "Insecta". He described the Insecta as:

A very numerous and various class consisting of small animals, breathing through lateral spiracles, armed on all sides with a bony skin, or covered with hair; furnished with many feet, and moveable antennae (or horns), which project from the head, and are the probable instruments of sensation.

Linnaean Characteristics

- Heart: 1 auricle, 0 ventricles. Cold, pus-like blood.
- Spiracles: lateral pores
- Jaw: lateral
- Penis: penetrates
- Organs of Sense: tongue, eyes, antennae on head, no brain, no ears, no nostrils
- Covering: a bony coat of mail
- Supports: feet, and in some, wings. Skips on dry ground and buzzes

== Orders ==
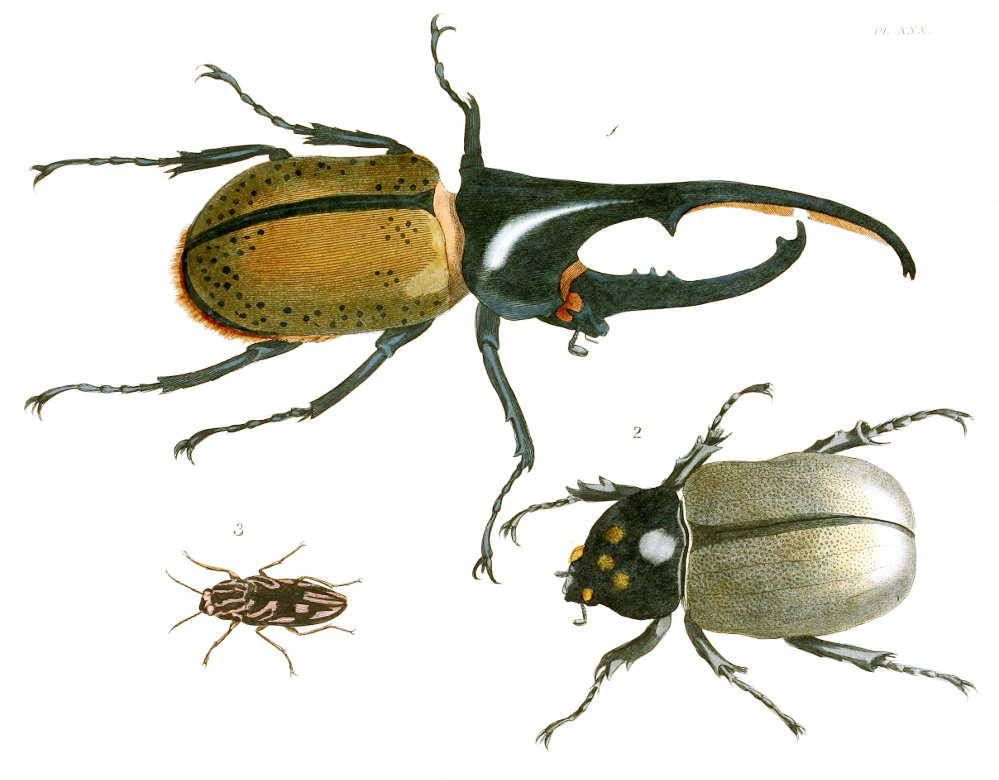
Scarabaeus hercules (now Dynastes hercules) was the first species in Linnaeus' class "Insecta".

Linnaeus divided the class Insecta into seven orders, based chiefly on the form of the wings. He also provided a key to the orders:

- 4 wings

- pairs dissimilar

- forewings fully hardened: Coleoptera
- forewings partly hardened: Hemiptera

- pairs similar

- wings covered with flat scales: Lepidoptera
- wings membranous

- Tail unarmed: Neuroptera
- Tail bearing a sting: Hymenoptera

- 2 wings: Diptera
- 0 wings: Aptera

Despite this key, however, Linnaeus grouped insects together that shared other affinities. His genus Coccus, containing the scale insects, he placed among the 4-winged Hemiptera, along with aphids and other plant-attacking insects, even though females have no wings, and males have two wings. Similarly, the sheep ked Hippobosca ovina (now Melophagus ovinus) was correctly placed among the Diptera, despite being wingless.

== Genera ==
- Coleoptera: Scarabaeus (scarab beetles), Dermestes (larder beetles), Hister (clown beetles), Attelabus (leaf-rolling weevils), Curculio (true weevils), Silpha (carrion beetles), Coccinella (ladybirds or ladybugs), Cassida (tortoise beetles), Chrysomela (leaf beetles), Meloe (blister beetles), Tenebrio (darkling beetles), Mordella (tumbling flower beetles), Staphylinus (rove beetles), Cerambyx (longhorn beetles), Cantharis (soldier beetles), Elater (click beetles), Cicindela (ground beetles), Buprestis (jewel beetles), Dytiscus (Dytiscidae), Carabus, Necydalis (necydaline beetles), Forficula (earwigs), Blatta (cockroaches) and Gryllus (other orthopteroid insects)
- Hemiptera: Cicada (cicadas), Notonecta (backswimmers), Nepa (water scorpions), Cimex (bedbugs), Aphis (aphids), Chermes (woolly aphids), Coccus (scale insects) and Thrips (thrips)
- Lepidoptera: Papilio (butterflies), Sphinx (hawk moths), Phalaena (moths)
- Neuroptera: Libellula (dragonflies and damselflies), Ephemera (mayflies), Phryganea (caddisflies and stoneflies), Hemerobius (lacewings), Panorpa (scorpionflies) and Raphidia (snakeflies)
- Hymenoptera: Cynips (Gall wasps), Tenthredo (sawflies), Ichneumon (ichneumon wasps), Sphex (digger wasps), Vespa (hornets), Apis (bees), Formica (ants) and Mutilla (velvet ants)
- Diptera: Oestrus (botflies), Tipula (crane flies), Musca (house flies), Tabanus (horse flies), Culex (mosquitoes), Empis (dance flies), Conops (thick-headed flies), Asilus (robber flies), Bombylius (bee flies) and Hippobosca (louse flies)
- Aptera: Lepisma (silverfish), Podura (springtails), Termes (termites), Pediculus (lice), Pulex (fleas), Acarus (mites and ticks), Phalangium (harvestmen), Aranea (spiders), Scorpio (scorpions), Cancer (crabs, lobsters and kin), Monoculus (water fleas and kin), Oniscus (woodlice), Scolopendra (centipedes) and Julus (millipedes)
