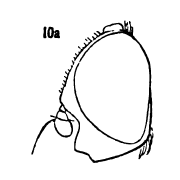
- male

Scientific classification
- Kingdom: Animalia
- Phylum: Arthropoda
- Clade: Pancrustacea
- Class: Insecta
- Order: Diptera
- Family: Syrphidae
- Subfamily: Eristalinae
- Tribe: Brachyopini
- Subtribe: Brachyopina
- Genus: Chrysogaster
- Species: C. antitheus

Binomial name
- Chrysogaster antitheus Walker, 1849

Synonyms
- Chrysogaster greeni Shannon, 1916; Chrysogaster nigripes Loew, 1863; Chrysogaster ontario Curran, 1925; Chrysogaster ruficornis Harris, 1835; Chrysogaster texana Shannon, 1916; Orthoneura ustulata Loew, 1869

= Chrysogaster antitheus =

Species of fly

Chrysogaster antitheus (Walker, 1849), the Short-haired Wrinkle Fly, is a fairly common species of syrphid fly found in North America. Hoverflies get their names from the ability to remain nearly motionless while in flight. The adults are also known as flower flies for they are commonly found around and on flowers, from which they get both energy-giving nectar and protein-rich pollen. The larvae in this genus are aquatic rat-tailed larvae.

== Description ==
For terminology see Speight key to genera and glossary

Size

7–8 mm (0.28–0.31 in)

Head

The head is completely shiny, except for a strip across the face beneath the antennae. Sometimes, the head is a deep cobalt blue. The frontal triangle is large and swollen, with a longitudinal depression. The frons of the female, is broad and long, is heavily wrinkled on the sides, with a narrow smooth area in the middle. When viewed from the side, the face has a gently concave shape and is noticeably bumpy below the center. The epistoma, the area between the frons and the mouth, is not prominent. The antennae are very small, with the first two segments being short and reddish yellow, and the third segment being round or slightly oval, also reddish yellow with a darker upper edge. In females, the third segment of the antennae is much larger than in males. The eyes are a single color, and they are holoptic.

Thorax

The dorsum of thorax is opaque black, sometimes deep cobalt blue, with numerous small, greenish, more shining spots, which on the sides become confluent, forming stripes.

Wings

The wings extend well beyond the abdomen. The wings are a little blackish, more nearly hyaline near the base and posterior part and more or less clouded on the outer part, especially in the end of the marginal, sub-marginal, and first posterior cells. (r1, r2_3 and r4+5); The stigma is dilutely brownish. the last section of the fourth vein (M1) very oblique, a little convex outward near the angle, and then more broadly concave, the tip joining the third vein ( R4+5) in a right angle. Vein M2 is prominent as a spur off of M1. The wings may almost wholly lack the blackish clouds. The last section of R4+5+M longer than crossvein h and usually longer than crossvein r-m The crossvein r-m is located before the middle of the discal cell.

external image gbif.org

LEGS

The legs are wholly greenish black

ABDOMEN
The disk of abdomen is dark opaque black, with brassy green margins. Dorsum of abdomen subopaque, the sides bright steel blue.

== Distribution ==
Canada, United States.
