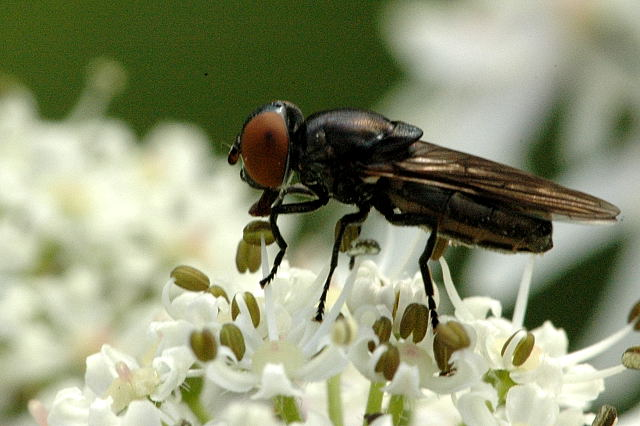
- Chrysogaster solstitialis

Scientific classification
- Kingdom: Animalia
- Phylum: Arthropoda
- Clade: Pancrustacea
- Class: Insecta
- Order: Diptera
- Family: Syrphidae
- Subfamily: Eristalinae
- Tribe: Brachyopini
- Subtribe: Brachyopina
- Genus: Chrysogaster; Meigen, 1803

Type species
- Musca cemiteriorum Linnaeus, 1758

Synonyms
- Chrysogaster Meigen, 1800; Lardaria Gistel, 1848; Melanogaster Rondani, 1857; Crysogaster Rondani, 1865; Chrisogaster Rondani, 1868; Liochrysogaster Stackelberg, 1924; Ighboulomyia Kassebeer, 1999

= Chrysogaster =

Genus of flies

Chrysogaster is a genus of small hoverflies in the subfamily Eristalinae. They are dark or black with shiny colourful reflections and can often be seen visiting flowers in damp marshy areas where the aquatic larvae live. Species in the related genera Melanogaster, Orthonevra, Lejogaster and Riponnensia were formerly treated as members of Chrysogaster.

== Species ==
- Chrysogaster aerosa Loew, 1843
- Chrysogaster africana Hull, 1944
- Chrysogaster aliniensis Mutin, 1999
- Chrysogaster antitheus Walker, 1849
- Chrysogaster apicalis Bezzi, 1920
- Chrysogaster atlasi Kassebeer, 1999
- Chrysogaster basalis Loew, 1857
- Chrysogaster cemiteriorum (Linnaeus, 1758)
- Chrysogaster curvistylus (Vujić & Stuke, 1998)
- Chrysogaster formosana Shiraki, 1930
- Chrysogaster hirtella Loew, 1843
- Chrysogaster inflatifrons Shannon, 1916
- Chrysogaster jaroslavensis Stackelberg, 1922
- Chrysogaster kirgisorum Stackelberg, 1952
- Chrysogaster laevigata Bezzi, 1915
- Chrysogaster lindbergi Kassebeer, 1999
- Chrysogaster lucida Scopoli, 1763
- Chrysogaster mediterraneus Vujić, 1999
- Chrysogaster ocularia Hervé-Bazin, 1914
- Chrysogaster parumplicata Loew, 1840
- Chrysogaster pilocapita Hull, 1944
- Chrysogaster poecilophthalma Bezzi, 1908
- Chrysogaster poecilops Bezzi, 1915
- Chrysogaster pollinifacies Violovitsh, 1956
- Chrysogaster proserpina Hull, 1944
- Chrysogaster quinquestriata Szilády, 1942
- Chrysogaster rondanii Maibach & Goeldlin de Tiefenau, 1995
- Chrysogaster semiopaca Matsumura, 1916
- Chrysogaster simplex Loew, 1843
- Chrysogaster sinensis Stackelberg, 1952
- Chrysogaster solstitialis (Fallén, 1817)
- Chrysogaster spiloptera Bezzi, 1915
- Chrysogaster stackelbergi Violovitsh, 1978
- Chrysogaster tadzhikorum Stackelberg, 1952
- Chrysogaster tumescens Loew, 1873
- Chrysogaster virescens Loew, 1854
