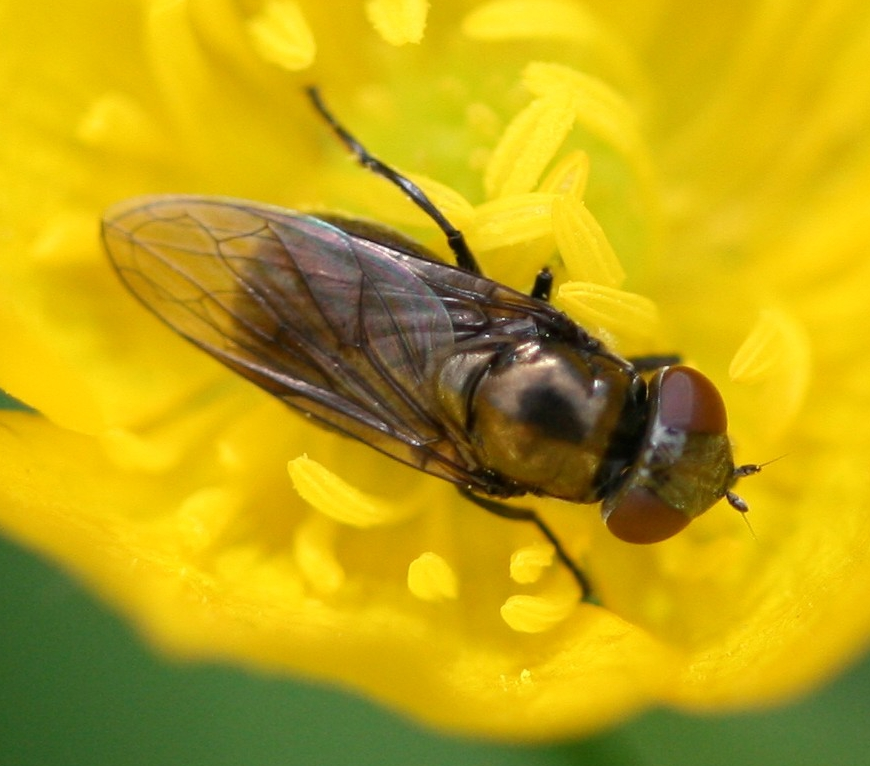
- female

Scientific classification
- Kingdom: Animalia
- Phylum: Arthropoda
- Class: Insecta
- Order: Diptera
- Family: Syrphidae
- Subfamily: Eristalinae
- Tribe: Brachyopini
- Subtribe: Brachyopina
- Genus: Chrysogaster
- Species: C. virescens

Binomial name
- Chrysogaster virescens Loew, 1854

Synonyms
- Chrysogaster inornata Loew, 1854

= Chrysogaster virescens =

Species of fly

Chrysogaster virescens is a European species of hoverfly.

== Description ==
External images For terms see Morphology of Diptera

Wing length 5·75-6·75 mm. Antennae partly red. Face twice as wide as maximum width of an eye. Wings at most tinged brown on anterior part. Pleurae not pruinose. Male face with central knob small. The male genitalia are figured by Maibach, A. & Goeldlin de Tiefenau (1994) .

== Distribution ==
South Finland, Ireland, Britain and the Atlantic seaboard of Europe from Denmark to the Pyrenees and northern Spain. Also in Switzerland in Central Europe.

== Biology ==
Habitat: Woodland and wetland; fen carr, areas with flushes and streams in deciduous forest. Alnus Salix carr and poorly-drained scrub, streamsides in woodland. Flowers visited include white umbellifers, Filipendula, Ilex, Iris, Ranunculus. The flight period is end of April to mid July.
