= Chrysogaster aerosa =

Scientific classification
- Kingdom: Animalia
- Phylum: Arthropoda
- Class: Insecta
- Order: Diptera
- Family: Syrphidae
- Subfamily: Eristalinae
- Tribe: Brachyopini
- Subtribe: Brachyopina
- Genus: Chrysogaster
- Species: C. aerosa

Binomial name
- Chrysogaster aerosa

Species of fly

Chrysogaster aerosa is a European species of hoverfly.

== Distribution ==
Poland.
