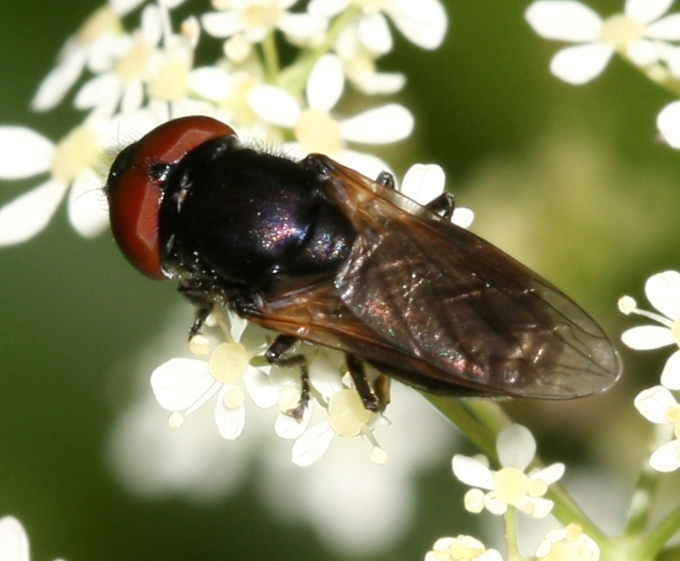
- male
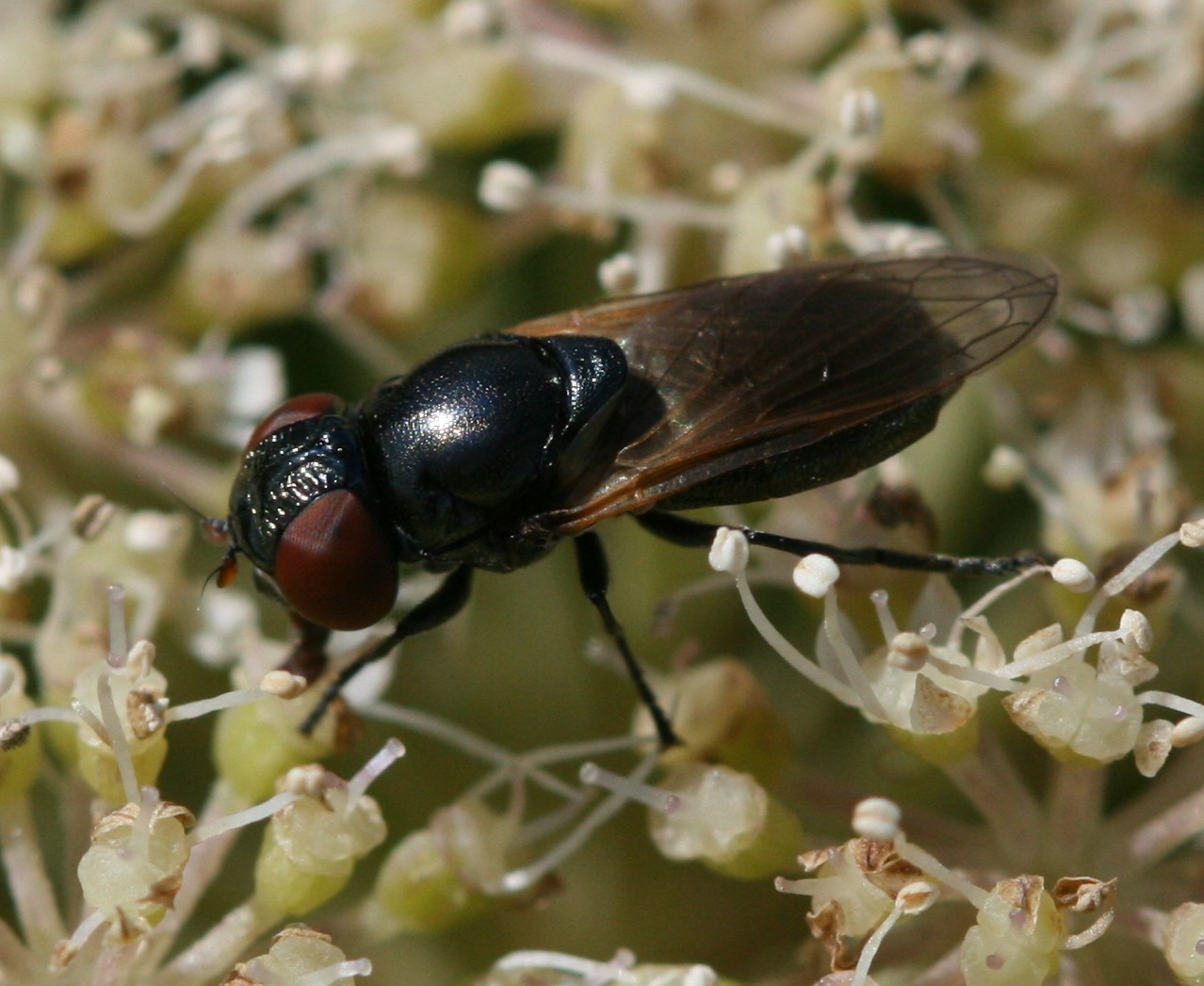
- female

Scientific classification
- Kingdom: Animalia
- Phylum: Arthropoda
- Class: Insecta
- Order: Diptera
- Family: Syrphidae
- Subfamily: Eristalinae
- Tribe: Brachyopini
- Subtribe: Brachyopina
- Genus: Chrysogaster
- Species: C. cemiteriorum

Binomial name
- Chrysogaster cemiteriorum (Linnaeus, 1758)

Synonyms
- Musca cemiteriorum Linnaeus, 1758; Musca coemiteriorum Müller, 1775; Chrysogaster chalybeata Meigen, 1822; Chrysogaster australis Macquart, 1855; Chrysogaster chalybeata var. azurea Szilády, 1935; Chrysogaster chalybeata var. coerulea Strobl, 1909; Chrysogaster chalybeata var. nigricans Szilády, 1935; Chrysogaster coenotaphii Meigen, 1830; Chrysogaster cupraria Macquart, 1829; Musca caemeteriorum Turton, 1801; Musca lineolata Gmelin, 1790; Musca speculifera Villers, 1789; Syrphus coemitoriorum Fabricius, 1787

= Chrysogaster cemiteriorum =

Species of fly

Chrysogaster cemiteriorum is a European species of hoverfly which can be found feeding on umbelliferous flowers wetlands and damp meadows.

== Description ==
For terms see Morphology of Diptera
Anterior lower part of mesopleuron (above and posterior to coxa) and hypopleuron covered with grey coating. Face in male very broad and the surstyli obtuse. A large Chrysogaster with a body length body of 6.0 to 8.0.mm.

See references for determination.

== Distribution ==
The Palearctic. Scandinavia South to the Mediterranean basin; Ireland East through Europe (including the Alps) into European Russia, Siberia and the Russian Far East.

== Habitat ==
Fen, valley bog and taiga.

== Biology ==
Flies over and among fen and damp meadow vegetation from June to September. Flowers visited include white umbellifers and Sambucus ebulus.
