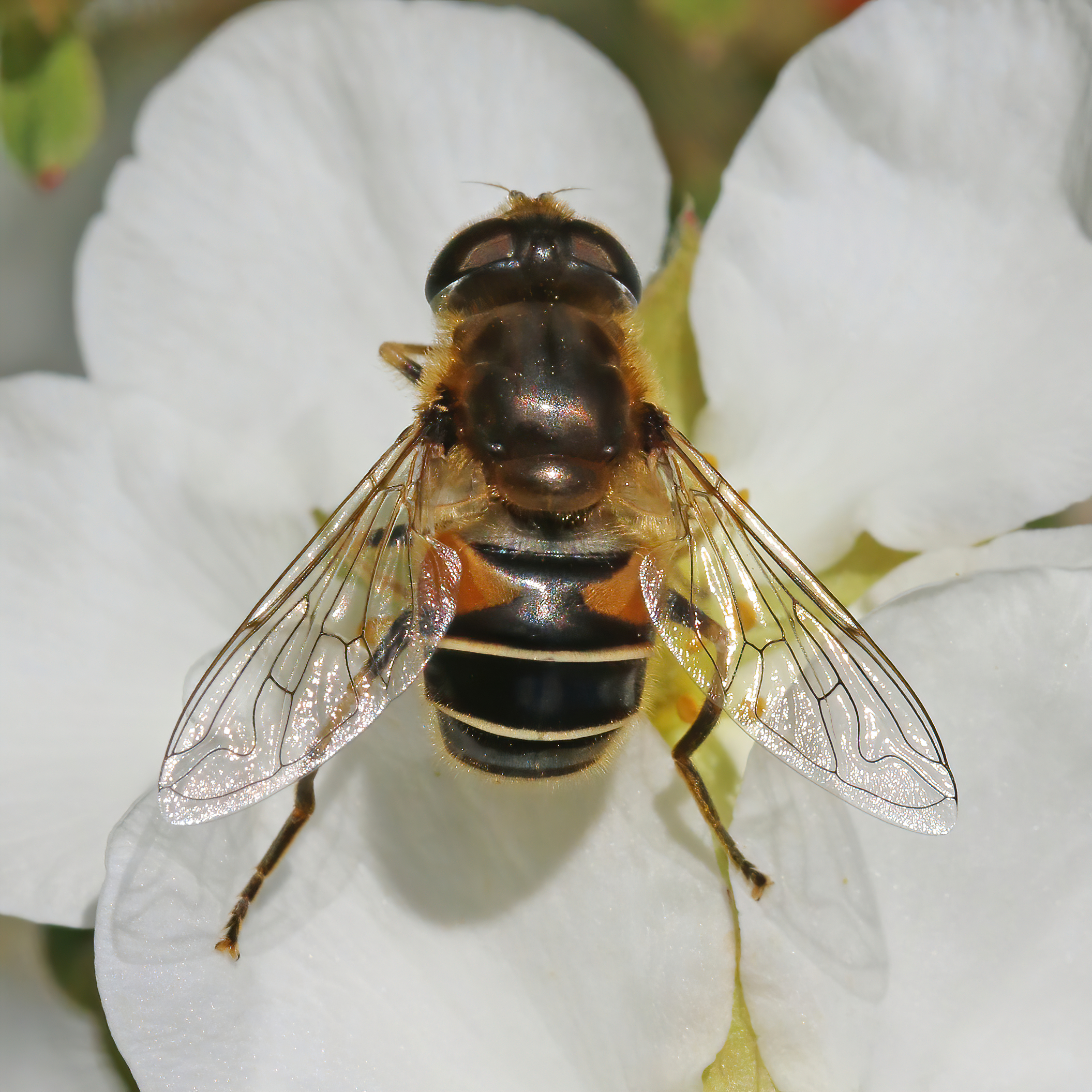
- female

Scientific classification
- Kingdom: Animalia
- Phylum: Arthropoda
- Clade: Pancrustacea
- Class: Insecta
- Order: Diptera
- Family: Syrphidae
- Genus: Eristalis
- Species: E. nemorum

Binomial name
- Eristalis nemorum (Linnaeus, 1758)

Synonyms
- Musca nemorum Linnaeus, 1758; Conops interruptus Poda, 1761; Eristalis interrupta (Poda, 1761); Musca lineolae Harris, 1776; Eristalis lineolae (Harris, 1776)

= Eristalis nemorum =

Species of fly

Eristalis nemorum is a species of hoverfly. It is found in the Palearctic (Fennoscandia South to Iberia, the Balkans and Italy, Ireland eastwards through Central Europe into Turkey and Russia and on into the Russian Far East, Siberia and Japan) and in the Nearctic (Quebec south to Colorado).

== Technical description ==
External images For terms, see: Morphology of Diptera.

Wing length: 8.25–10.5 mm (0.325–0.413 in). All tarsi are extensively black. Body-hairs are short. Arista plumose basal half. Densely dusted face has a black shining stripe. Hind femora are black in male. Wings are hyaline with quadrate brownish pterostigma (basal to merge of vein sc with costa). Body is yellow-haired. Hind metatarsi are darkened. The male genitalia are figured by Hippa et al. (2001). The larva is figured by Hartley (1961).

== Biology ==
The larvae are aquatic, and of the Rat-tailed maggot type. Adults are often seen visiting flowers. Flight period in the United Kingdom is from April to October, peaking around July and August. The males show a characteristic courtship display, hovering above a foraging female for minutes.

Animation: speed reduced 3x slower

When many males are present two or more males may hover above one female.

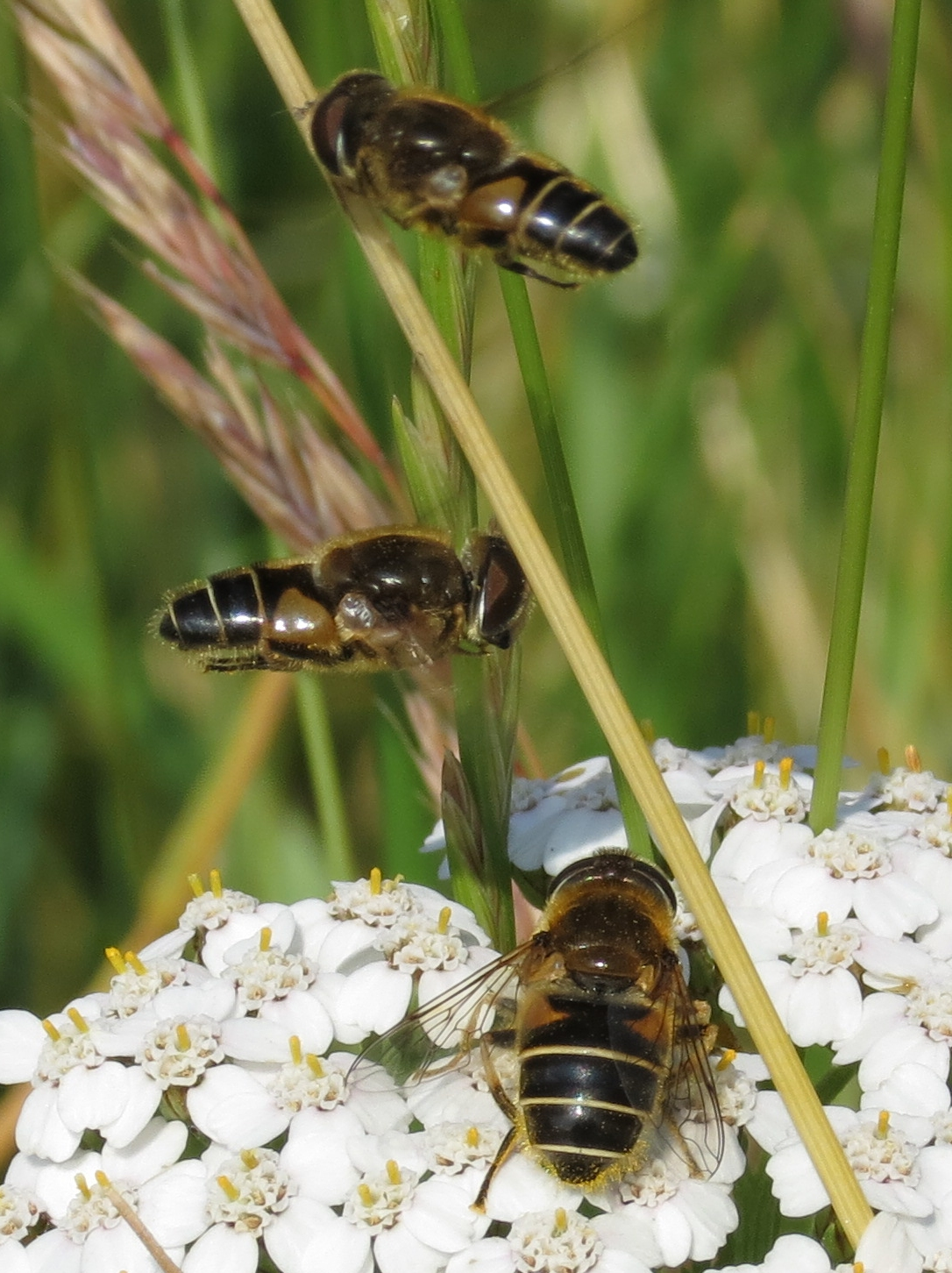
Two males hovering above one female.

Adult habitat is streamsides, fen meadow and poorly-drained pasture. Flowers visited include yellow composites, umbellifers, Cakile, Calluna vulgaris, Caltha, Cardamine, Cirsium, Crataegus, Eupatorium, Euphorbia, Filipendula, Malus, Menyanthes, Mentha, Parnassia, Prunus, Ranunculus, Rubus fruticosus, Salix, Sorbus, Succisa.
