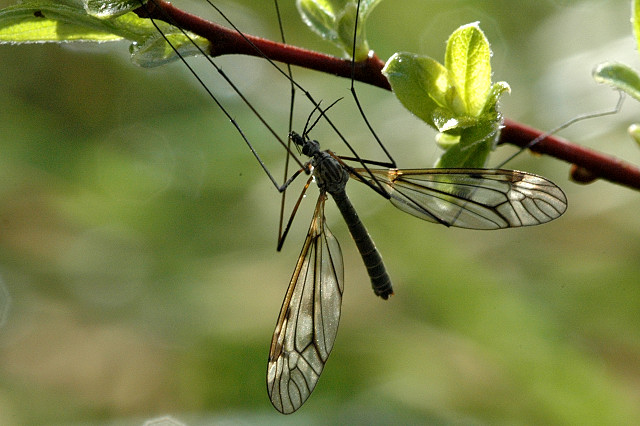
- Tipula hortorum male

Scientific classification
- Kingdom: Animalia
- Phylum: Arthropoda
- Clade: Pancrustacea
- Class: Insecta
- Order: Diptera
- Family: Tipulidae
- Genus: Tipula
- Subgenus: Vestiplex
- Species: T. hortorum

Binomial name
- Tipula hortorum Linnaeus, 1758

Synonyms
- Tipula nubeculosa Schummel, 1833 misident.; Tipula submarmorata misident.; Tipula meigeni misident.

= Tipula hortorum =

Species of fly

Tipula hortorum is a species of cranefly which is widespread throughout the West Palaearctic. It is a woodland species.

== Identification ==
See
