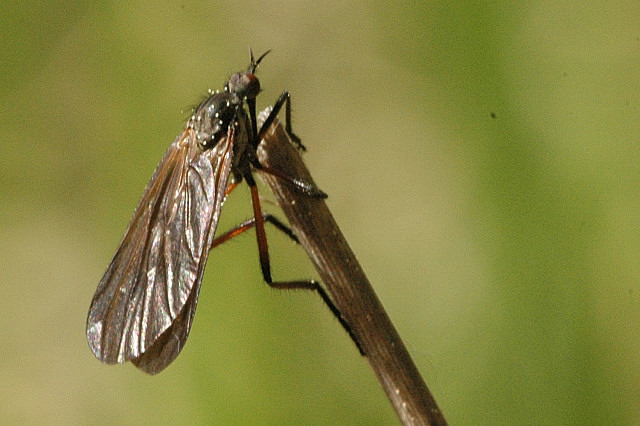

Scientific classification
- Kingdom: Animalia
- Phylum: Arthropoda
- Clade: Pancrustacea
- Class: Insecta
- Order: Diptera
- Family: Empididae
- Genus: Empis
- Subgenus: Platyptera
- Species: E. borealis

Binomial name
- Empis borealis Linnaeus, 1758

Synonyms
- Empis pagana Collin, 1961

= Empis borealis =

Species of fly

Empis borealis is a species of dance flies in the fly family Empididae. It is found in most of Europe, except the Balkan Peninsula, the Baltic Region and the Iberian Peninsula. The brown wings of the female are very broad, while the male fly’s wings are narrower.

This particular species of fly exhibits sex-role reversal in its mating process, with female flies aggregating in swarms to compete for male choice. Female fly swarms change their flying behavior in the presence of males, who present nuptial gifts to females before mating.

== Description ==
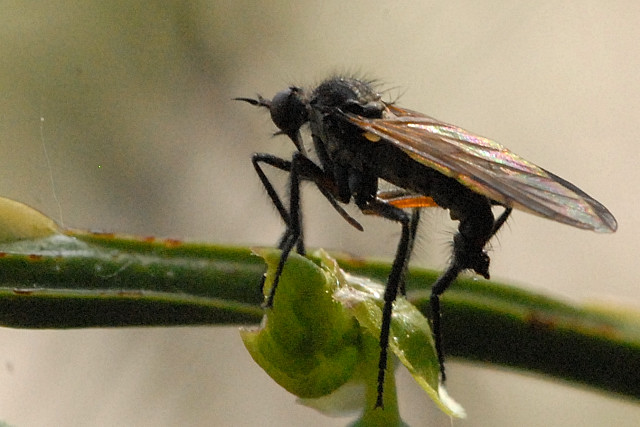
E. borealis

Empis borealis are empidids, commonly known as dance or balloon flies. Adult E. borealis are small- to medium-sized flies, about 6 to 8 mm long, with dark brown wings. The species exhibits sexual dimorphism in several attributes. Firstly, the fly's wing size depends on whether the fly is male or female. Females have broad wings, about 60% larger than those of the males. Males and females also differ in abdomen tip shape. Females have a pointed tip, while males have a larger tip with a hypopygium, or abdominal segment, that supports the copulatory structure. The species can be easily identified in the field because it is the only empidid species present during May.

One of the species’ common names is the balloon fly, which refers to the male flies’ practice of bringing nuptial gifts in a woven silk abdominal “balloon” to the females before mating. With their prey caught in these "balloons", male flies approach a swarm of females for mating.

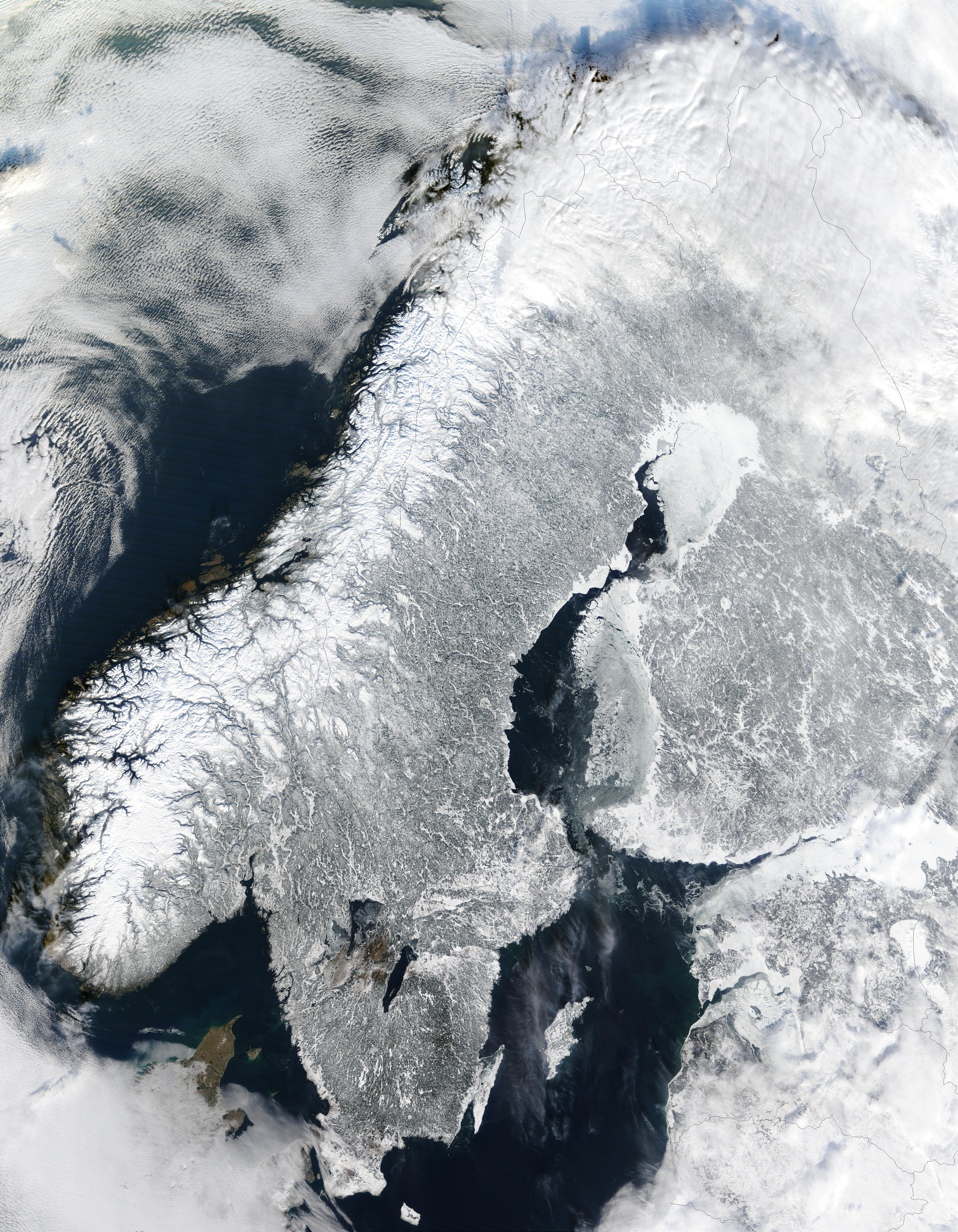
Scandinavia

== Distribution ==
Empis borealis is reported to be the most common empidid species in the colder parts of Scandinavia, though the fly’s distribution ranges east to west from western Siberia to Great Britain and north to south from Scandinavia to the Alps.

== Food resources ==
Adult E. borealis consume both nectar and smaller insects. Male flies tend to prey on soft-bodied insects. In one study, female flies only consumed prey during mating.

== Mating ==
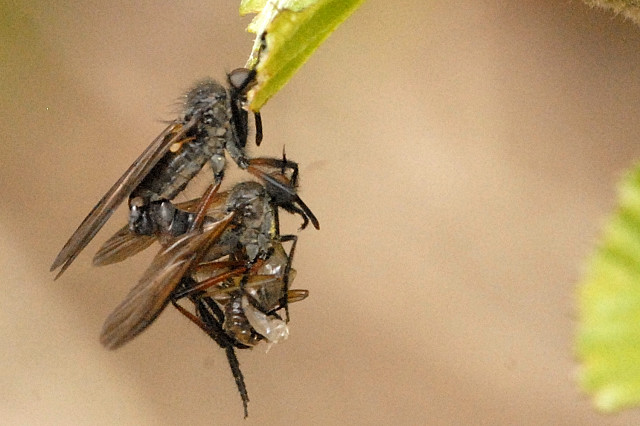
E. borealis mating

Empis borealis exhibits sex-role reversal, with females aggregating in swarms to compete for male choice, and males offering nuptial gifts to potential female mates.

=== Swarming ===
Female flies usually swarm together in groups of about five to ten flies, with some containing up to 40 flies. Swarming occurs near bushes or trees, from about 8:00am to 7:30pm. Female swarming depends highly on the weather. If conditions were windy or cloudy, researchers observed females resting until the weather improved. After one or two females began swarming again, the rest of the females would follow suit.

Researchers have observed a continuous equilibrium between the number of females resting and swarming at each swarm site. At any given time, the number of females at a swarm site consists of both those swarming and those resting. The total number of females at a swarm site then includes both the swarming and resting female flies.

Swarms generally range from 0.5 to 1.5 m in diameter, with the swarms being 0.5 to 6 m above the ground.

==== Swarm sites ====
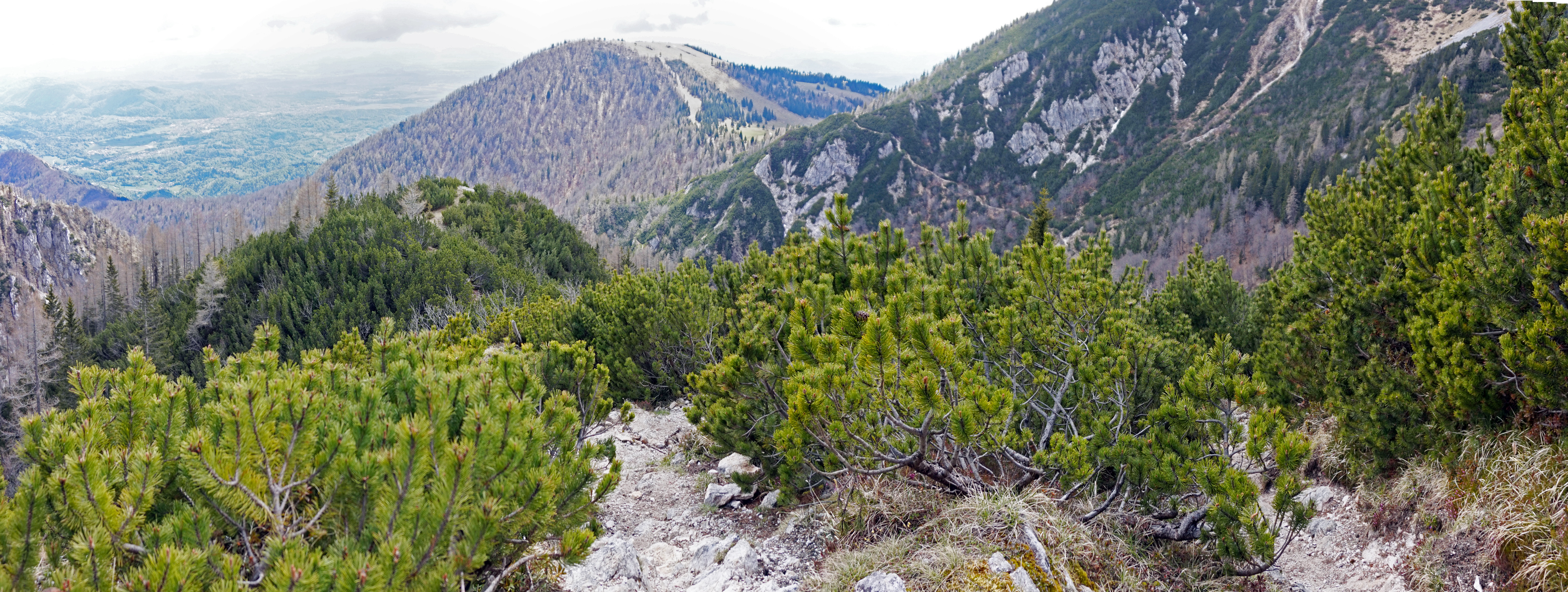
Coniferous trees

The position of E. borealis swarm sites varies throughout the day. As the day progresses, females seek sunnier sites as their current sites turn to shade. The largest swarms have been found during high daytime near coniferous trees in a mixed forest habitat.

===== Swarm site fidelity =====
This species of fly in particular has shown evidence of fidelity towards swarm sites; female flies continue to use the same sites that females have used in the past for mating. One study found that the number of females using various swarm sites across a period of four years was consistent. Although the number of females among different swarm sites varied, it did remain relatively similar across multiple mating seasons. Some sites are known to have been used for up to 18 years.

==== Female flight behavior ====
Female flying patterns vary depending on the presence or absence of male flies. When males are absent, female E. borealis exhibit slow, cruising flight or hovering with sudden up-down movements. However, in the presence of male flies, female flight behavior becomes erratic and has much more rapid movement. If a male with prey enters the swarm, the number of females in the swarm increases. Females that were previously resting at the swarm site landmarks would take off and join the swarm.

If males approach a swarm site with all the females resting, females usually take off and begin to swarm. However, if the female flies do not begin to fly, male flies make a few quick circles around the landmark where the females are resting. This action by the male generally incites swarming in the female flies.

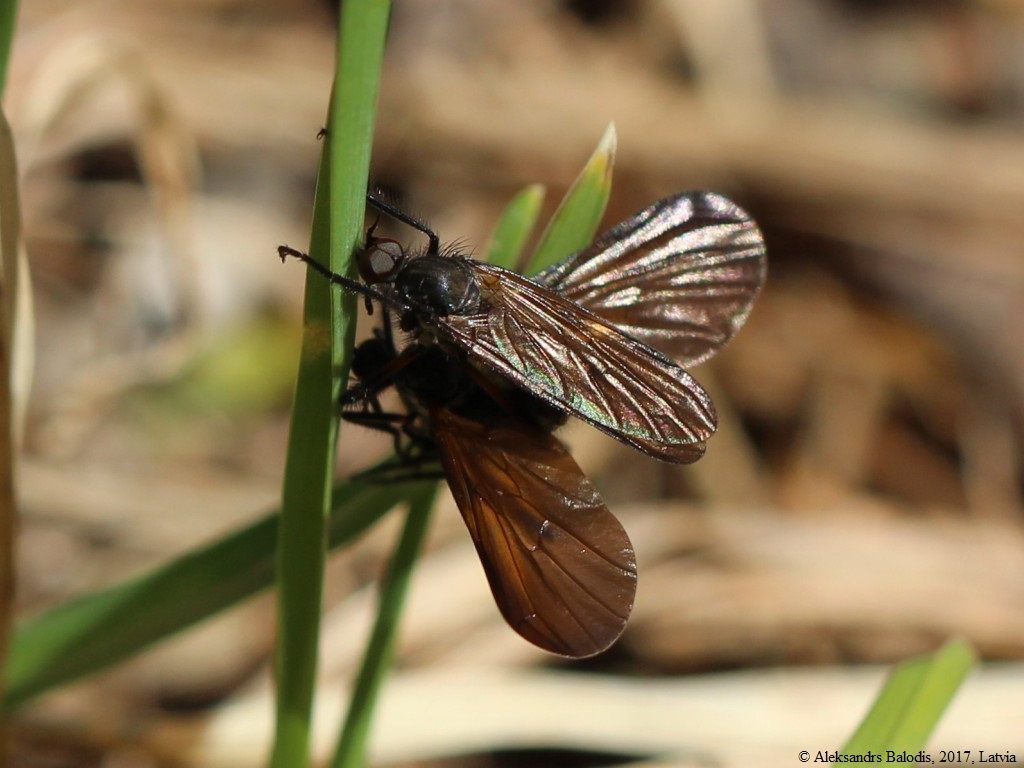
E. borealis mating

=== Nuptial gifts ===
Adult male E. borealis are known to present females with gifts before mating. Researchers have determined that there is a positive correlation between gift size and duration of copulation. When the nuptial gift that males brought was larger, the female would spend more time eating the gift, which prolonged the time of copulation. There were some instances in which prey size was large but copulation time was short. In these cases, the female fly’s spermatheca may have already been filled with sperm, rendering the male unable to transmit any of his own sperm, or prey volume may have been decreased from male consumption or use in a previous mating.

=== Male choice ===
Female flies compete for male choice, and researchers have observed that male E. borealis do discriminate among potential female mates at swarm sites. In one study, female flies with larger wings participated disproportionately in copulations at each swarm site, but male size and the size of nuptial gifts did not show a correlation with the size of the mating female. Moreover, male flies spent more time in large swarms and were more likely to leave smaller swarms without mating than larger swarms.
