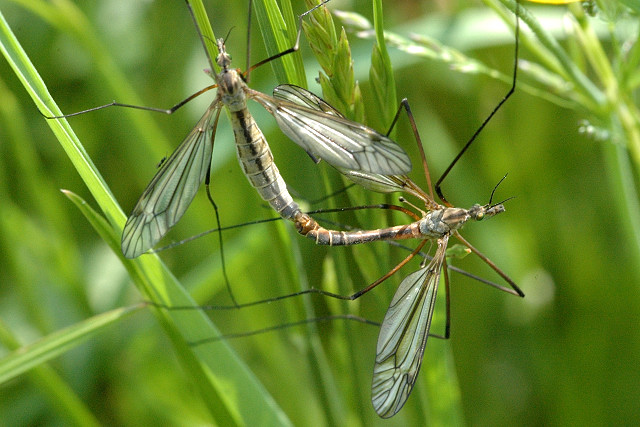

Scientific classification
- Kingdom: Animalia
- Phylum: Arthropoda
- Clade: Pancrustacea
- Class: Insecta
- Order: Diptera
- Family: Tipulidae
- Genus: Tipula
- Subgenus: Lunatipula
- Species: T. vernalis

Binomial name
- Tipula vernalis Meigen, 1804

Synonyms
- Tipula pendens Harris, 1776; Tipula ineola Meigen, 1818; Tipula breviterebrata Macquart, 1826; Tipula lactipennis Lindemann, 1846; Tipula nigricornis Strobl, 1910; Tipula hochhuthi Gimmerthal, 1927

= Tipula vernalis =

Species of fly

Tipula vernalis is a species of cranefly found in the West Palaearctic.
