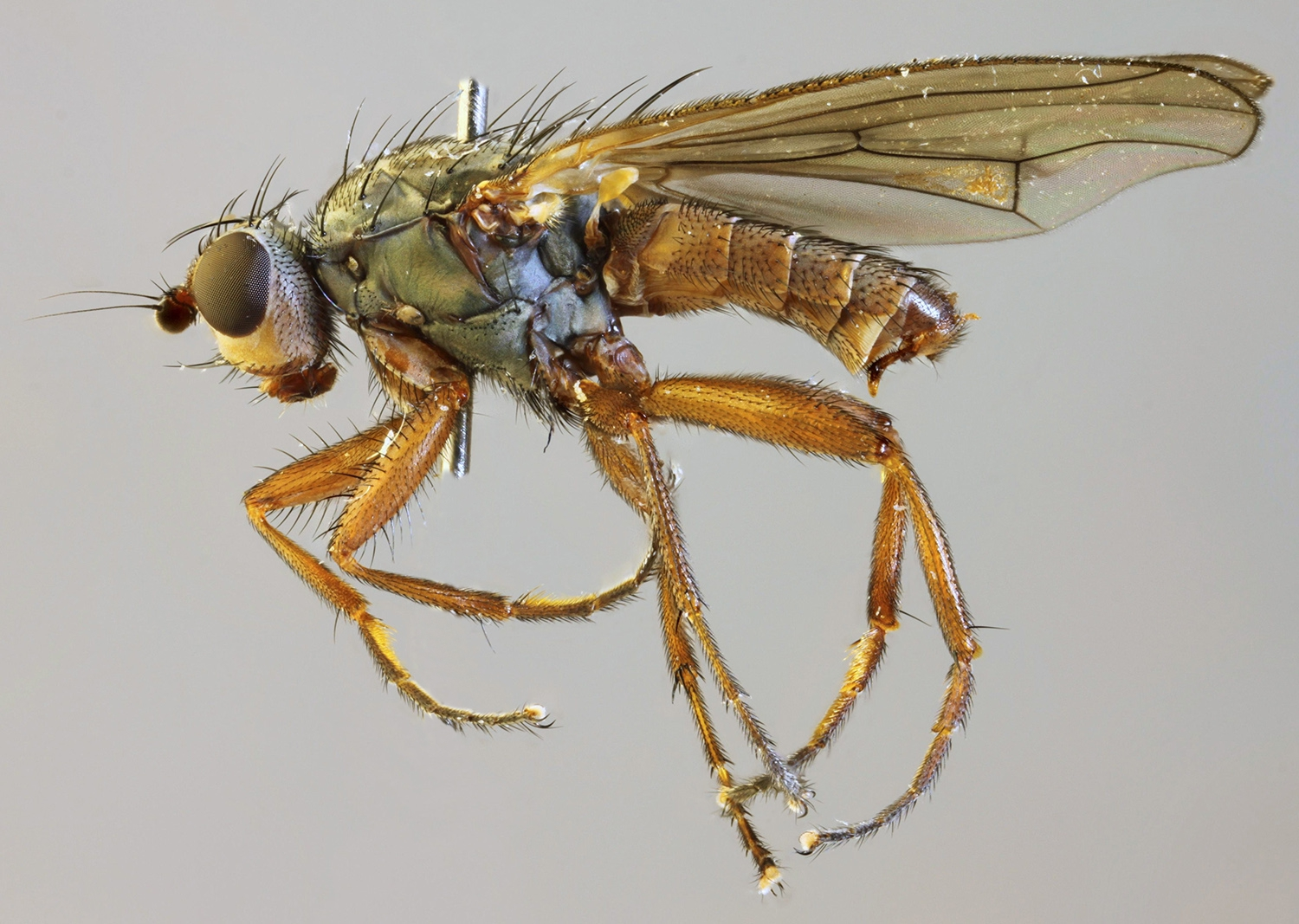
- Heleomyza serrata North Wales

Scientific classification
- Kingdom: Animalia
- Phylum: Arthropoda
- Class: Insecta
- Order: Diptera
- Family: Heleomyzidae
- Genus: Heleomyza
- Species: H. serrata

Binomial name
- Heleomyza serrata (Linnaeus, 1758)

= Heleomyza serrata =

Species of fly

Heleomyza serrata is a species of fly in the family Heleomyzidae. It is found in the Palearctic.

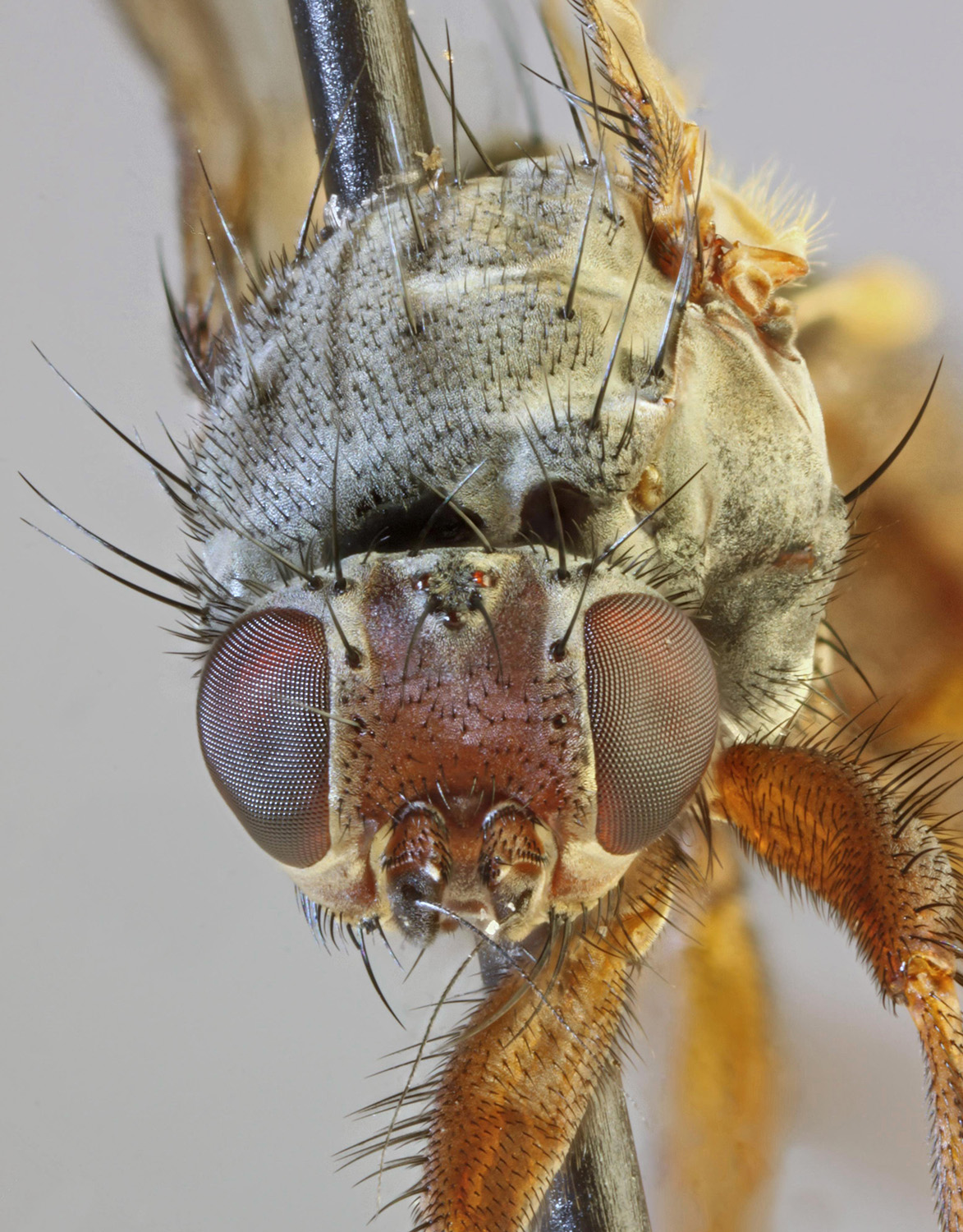

The body length is 3 to 7 mm. It is characterized by the presence of setae on the propleura, several pairs of setae on the prothorax and at most one hair on the mesopleura . The male's reproductive organs are characterized byrudimentary aedes, an unexpanded base of the epandrium, and surstyles that are much longer than the epandrium and are evenly curved along the entire length.For terms see Morphology of Diptera.

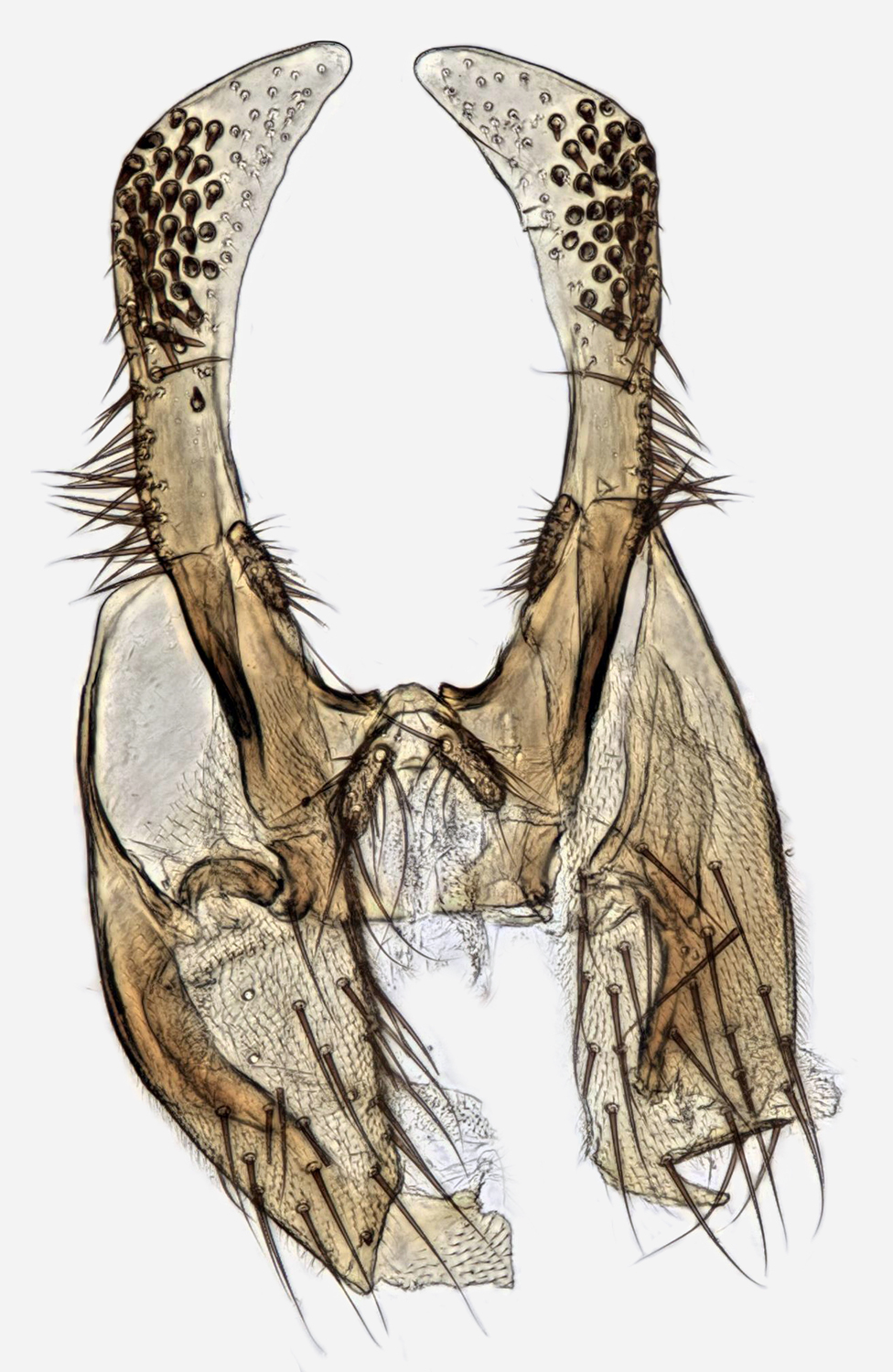

Heleomyza serrata is known from Spain, Iceland, Ireland, Great Britain, France, Belgium, the Netherlands, Germany, Denmark, Norway, Sweden, Finland, Switzerland, Austria, Poland, the Czech Republic, Slovakia, Ukraine, Romania, Bulgaria, Russia (in including the northern Caucasus and Siberia), Kazakhstan and North America
