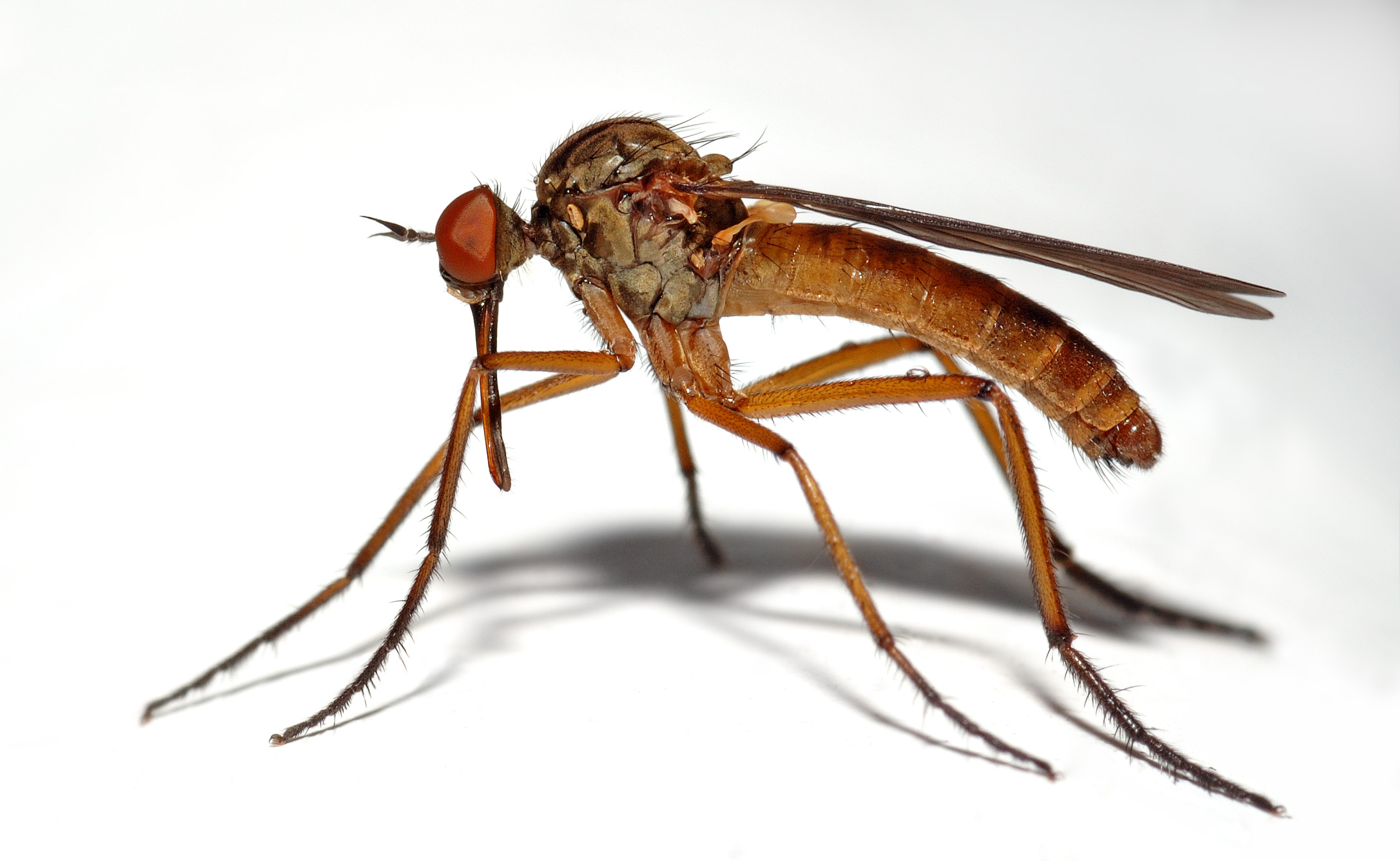
- Male Empis livida

Scientific classification
- Kingdom: Animalia
- Phylum: Arthropoda
- Clade: Pancrustacea
- Class: Insecta
- Order: Diptera
- Family: Empididae
- Genus: Empis
- Subgenus: Kritempis
- Species: E. livida

Binomial name
- Empis livida Linnaeus, 1758

Synonyms
- Asilus tipuloides Linnaeus, 1758; Empis constans Harris, 1780; Empis fugeo Harris, 1780; Empis tipuloides (Linnaeus, 1758)

= Empis livida =

Species of fly

Empis livida is a species of fly in the Empididae family. It is included in the subgenus Kritempis of the genus Empis. Males range from 7.5 to 9.3 millimetres (0.30 to 0.37 in), females 7.5 to 10.2 millimetres (0.30 to 0.40 in). The male's abdomen is brownish and its wings appear faintly brown and clouded. The female's abdomen is gray and its wings are clear. E. livida lives in hedgerows, feeding on the nectar of several species of Rosaceae, several species of Asteraceae, and Heracleum sphondylium nectar; they also feed on other insects. They live all across temperate and Northern Europe, the only species with such a wide distribution. E. livida larvae are also carnivorous and live in damp soil and leaf litter. Adults fly in between April and July.
