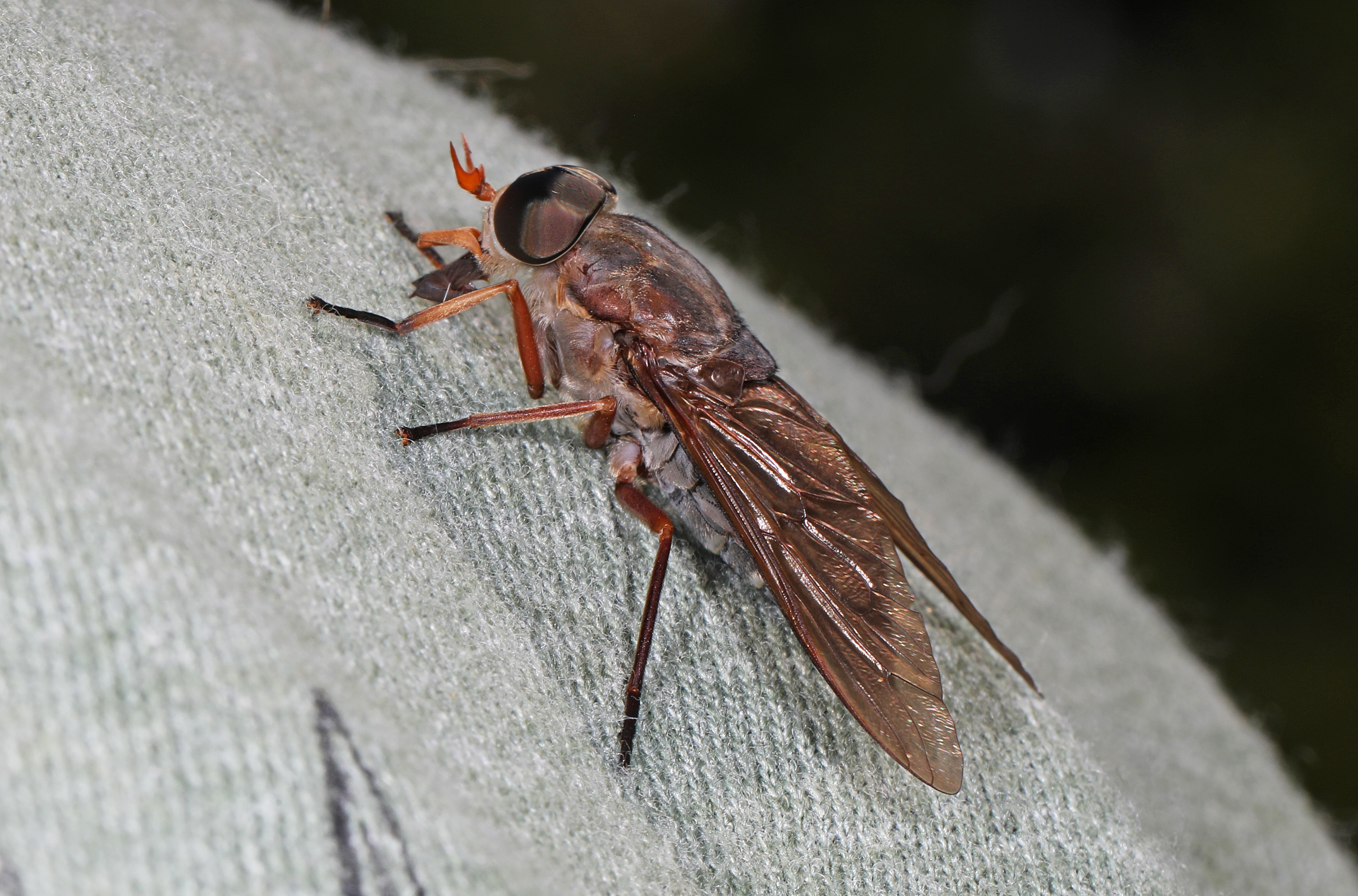

Scientific classification
- Kingdom: Animalia
- Phylum: Arthropoda
- Clade: Pancrustacea
- Class: Insecta
- Order: Diptera
- Family: Tabanidae
- Subfamily: Tabaninae
- Tribe: Tabanini
- Genus: Tabanus
- Species: T. calens

Binomial name
- Tabanus calens Linnaeus, 1758

Synonyms
- Tabanus bicolor Macquart, 1847; Tabanus coesiofasciatus Macquart, 1855; Tabanus giganteus De Geer, 1776; Tabanus lineatus Fabricius, 1781; Tabanus pallidus Palisot De Beauvois, 1809

= Tabanus calens =

Species of fly

Tabanus calens is a species of horse fly in the family Tabanidae.

== Distribution ==
The species is found across Canada and the United States.

== Subspecies ==
These two subspecies belong to the species Tabanus calens:

- Tabanus calens calens Linnaeus, 1758
- Tabanus calens giganteus De Geer, 1776
