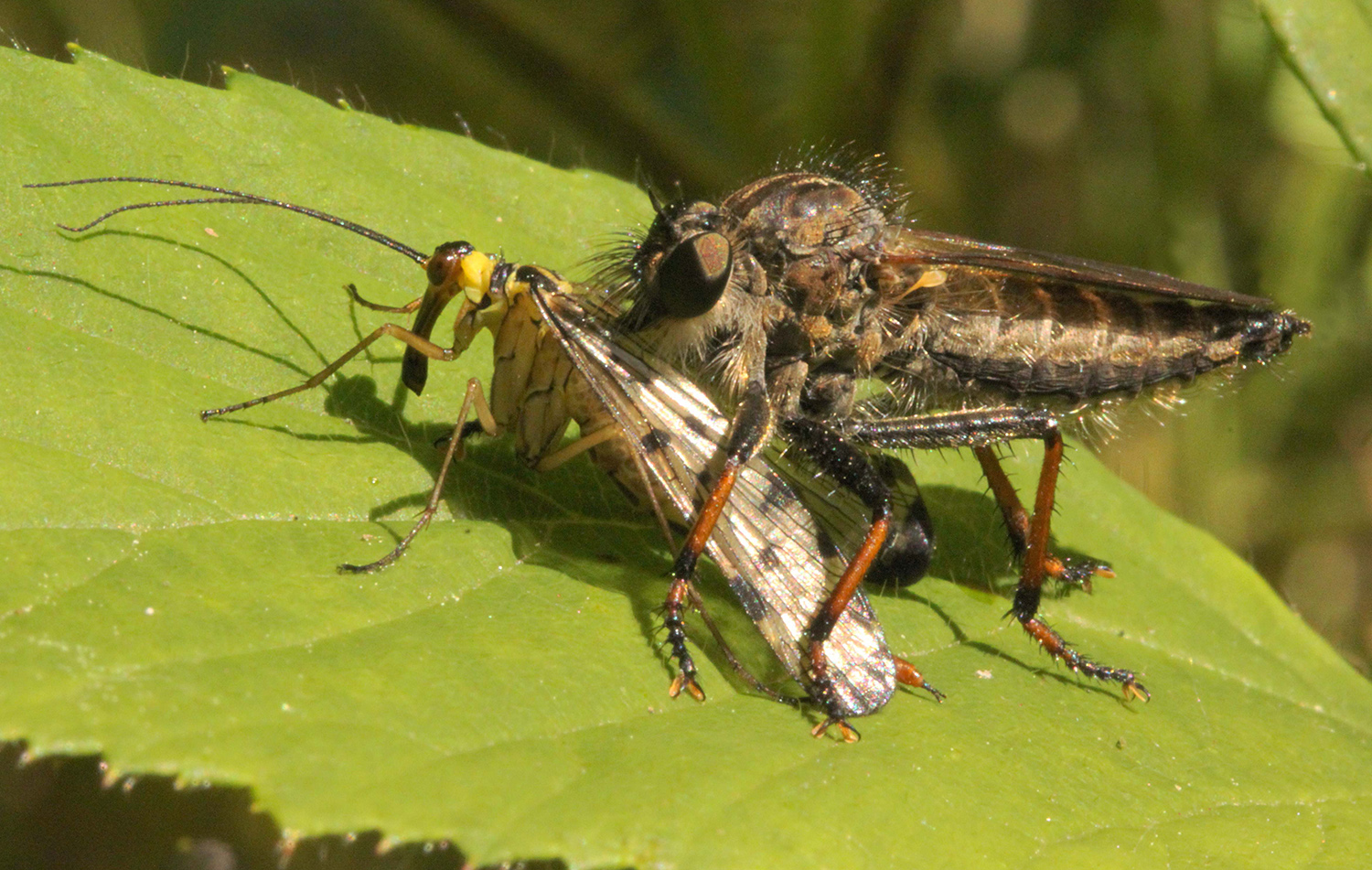
- Pamponerus germanicus, Harlech, North Wales

Scientific classification
- Kingdom: Animalia
- Phylum: Arthropoda
- Clade: Pancrustacea
- Class: Insecta
- Order: Diptera
- Family: Asilidae
- Genus: Pamponerus
- Species: P. germanicus

Binomial name
- Pamponerus germanicus (Linnaeus, 1758)

= Pamponerus germanicus =

Species of fly

Pamponerus germanicus is a Palearctic species of robber fly in the family Asilidae.

It is a large, grey-brown asid (15-19 mm.) Difficult to distinguish from other Pamponerus. Wolff, Gebel and Geller-Grimm (2021), ( Majer (1997), van den Broek (1979), Stubbs and Drake (2001) all provide keys, descriptions and illustrations. Older works are also useful eg. Seguy (1920)
