= List of sepsid fly species recorded in Europe =

This is a list of the species of sepsid fly recorded in Europe.

- Subfamily Orygmatinae Frey 1921

- Genus Orygma Meigen, 1830

- O. luctuosum Meigen, 1830

- Subfamily Sepsinae Walker, 1833

- Genus Ortalischema Frey 1925

- O. albitarse (Zetterstedt, 1847)

- Genus Zuskamira Pont, 1987

- Z. inexpectata Pont, 1987

- Genus Themira Robineau-Desvoidy, 1830

- T. annulipes (Meigen, 1826)
- T. arctica Becker in Becker, 1915
- T. biloba Andersson, 1975
- T. germanica Duda, 1926
- T. gracilis (Zetterstedt, 1847)
- T. leachi (Meigen, 1826)
- T. lucida (Staeger in Schiødte, 1844)
- T. malformans Melander & Spuler, 1917
- T. minor (Haliday, 1833)
- T. nigricornis (Meigen, 1826)
- T. paludosa Elberg, 1963
- T. pusilla (Zetterstedt, 1847)
- T. putris (Linnaeus, 1758)
- T. ringdahli Pont, 2002
- T. sipmlicipes (Duda, 1926)
- T. superba (Haliday, 1833)

- Genus Susanomira Pont, 1987

- S. caucasica Pont, 1987

- Genus Meroplius Rondani, 1874

- M. fukuharai (Iwasa, 1984)
- M. minutus (Wiedemann, 1830)

- Genus Saltella Robineau-Desvoidy, 1830

- S. nigripes Robineau-Desvoidy, 1830
- S. sphondylii (Schrank, 1803)

- Genus Nemopoda Robineau-Desvoidy, 1830

- N. nitidula (Fallén, 1820)
- N. pectinulata Loew, 1873
- N. speiseri (Duda, 1926)

- Genus Sepsis Fallén, 1810

- S. barbata Becker, 1907
- S. biflexuosa Strobl, 1893
- S. cynipsea (Linnaeus, 1758)
- S. duplicata Haliday in Curtis, 1837
- S. flavimana Meigen, 1826
- S. fulgens Meigen, 1826
- S. luteipes Melander & Spuler, 1917
- S. neocynipsea Melander & Spuler, 1917
- S. nigripes Meigen, 1826
- S. orthocnemis Frey, 1908
- S. punctum (Fabricius, 1794)
- S. thoracica (Robineau-Desvoidy, 1830)
- S. violacea Meigen, 1826
- S. fissa Becker, 1903
- S. lateralis Wiedemann, 1830
- S. niveipennis Becker, 1903
- S. pseudomonostigma Ursu, 1969
- S. setulosa (Duda, 1826)
