= Pseudopalaeosepsis =

Scientific classification
- Kingdom: Animalia
- Phylum: Arthropoda
- Clade: Pancrustacea
- Class: Insecta
- Order: Diptera
- Family: Sepsidae
- Subfamily: Sepsinae
- Genus: Pseudopalaeosepsis; Ozerov, 1992

Type species
- Pseudopalaeosepsis nigricoxa Ozerov, 1992

Genus of flies

Pseudopalaeosepsis is a genus of flies in the family Sepsidae. They can be found in Latin America, having been collected in French Guiana and Costa Rica.

Like several other related fly genera, males in the genus have lobes on the sternum that are used to court mates during intercourse. The unclear evolutionary origin of these lobes has led to confusion over the exact taxonomy of Pseudopalaeosepsis; Mirifica and Muricata, the two species described by Vera C. Silva, were initially described as members of Archisepsis.

== Species ==
- Pseudopalaeosepsis mirifica (Silva, 1993)
- Pseudopalaeosepsis muricata (Silva, 1993)
- Pseudopalaeosepsis nigricoxa Ozerov, 1992
