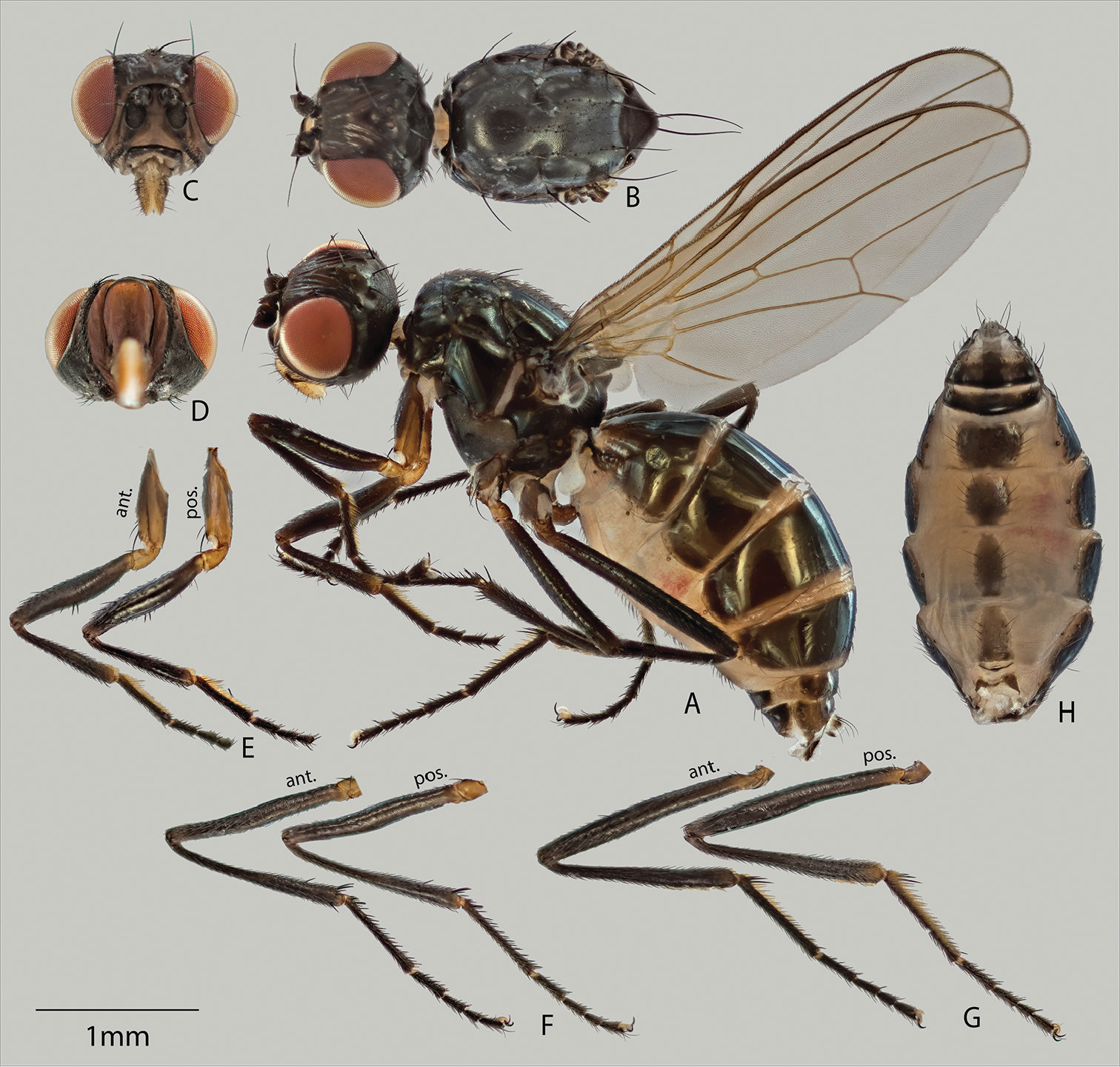

Scientific classification
- Kingdom: Animalia
- Phylum: Arthropoda
- Class: Insecta
- Order: Diptera
- Family: Sepsidae
- Genus: Themira
- Species: T. lohmanus

Binomial name
- Themira lohmanus Ang, 2017

= Themira lohmanus =

Species of fly

Themira lohmanus, Lohman's ensign-fly, is a species of fly in the family Sepsidae discovered in Central Park, New York City in 2017. Notable for its late discovery despite living in an extremely well-documented area, the fly was first collected by scientists in 2007, being misidentified as the closely related Themira biloba due to the two flies' very similar appearance. The failure of mating trials conducted ten years later between known T. biloba specimens and the New York City species confirmed its identity as a separate taxon.

== Description and behavior ==
So far collected in Central Park and Prospect Park, Brooklyn, the Lohman's ensign-fly exclusively breeds in duck droppings; for this reason it is thought to be more abundant in urban parks than in unaltered habitats due to the greater concentration of duck droppings on dry land. The fly was named in honor of David Lohman, an entomologist at the City College of New York.
