= Punctum =

Punctum, plural puncta, adjective punctate, is an anatomical term for a sharp point or tip. It may also refer to:

== Medical ==
- Lacrimal punctum, a minute opening on the margins of the eyelids that collect tears produced by the lacrimal glands
- Blind spot (vision), or punctum cecum, the blind spot in human vision corresponding to the location of the optic disk
- Erb's point (neurology) or punctum nervosum, a nerve point in the human neck
- Imperforate lacrimal punctum, a congenital disorder of dogs

== Unrelated species named punctum ==
- Allium punctum, a species of wild onion
- Amyna punctum, a moth of the family Noctuidae
- Cinguloterebra punctum, a sea snail of the family Terebridae
- Phylloxiphia punctum, a moth of the family Sphingidae
- Sepsis punctum, a fly of the family Sepsidae
- Zygaena punctum, a moth of the family Zygaenidae

== Other ==
- Punctum (gastropod), a genus of land snails
- Punctum delens, typographic marks used to indicate deletion
- Neume, the basic element of Western and Eastern systems of musical notation prior to the invention of five-line staff notation
- An uncategorized celestial object in the galaxy NGC 4945
- Equant, punctum aequans, is a mathematical concept developed by Claudius Ptolemy in the 2nd century AD to account for the observed motion of heavenly bodies
- A concept in the 1980 French philosophy book Camera Lucida
- A medieval unit of time corresponding to a quarter-hour
- In photography, a term used by Roland Barthes to refer to an incidental but personally poignant detail in a photograph
- Punctate, a botanical term meaning marked with an indefinite number of dots, spots, pits or glands
