= S. communis =

S. communis may refer to:

- Sepsis communis, a synonym for Sepsis fulgens, the lesser dung fly, a small ant-mimicking fly species
- Sylvia communis, the whitethroat, a common and widespread typical warbler species

== See also ==
- Communis (disambiguation)
