= Kathy Feng-Yi Su =

Singaporean biologist

Kathy Feng-Yi Su is an entomologist and evolutionary biologist from Singapore. She is an academic researcher, whose work focusses on sexual dimorphism particularly in the family Sepsidae.

== Education ==
Su completed her doctoral research at Aix-Marseille University, France, after completing her BA and MA at the National University of Singapore. She is Lee Kuan Yew Post-doctoral Fellow at the National University of Singapore Faculty of Biological Sciences.

== Research ==
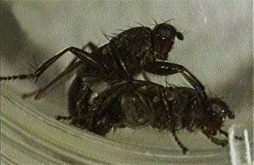
Orygma luctuosum (Puniamoorthy, Feng-Yi Su, and Meier, 2008)

Su is an expert in sexual dimorphism across species and her research in Diptera has shown how it is affected by ecological and molecular mechanisms. As an entomologist she is a leading expert in Sepsidae taxonomy. She is also interested in phylogeny, including the theoretical aspects of sequence data analysis.

=== Taxonomy ===
Su described a new species of sepsid fly, Themira Iohmanus, discovered in from Central Park. The genera has only thirteen species, so the discovery of an additional species is highly notable, particularly because its location is in one of the most intensely populated cities in the world.

=== Sexual dimorphism ===
Su has researched mating behaviours in several species, but her most significant work is on flies and how genetic and social processes produce sexual dimorphism.

==== Social Behaviour in Courtship and Genetics ====
Su has studied the link between mating call and genetics in South-East Asian anuran (frog) populations and male and female courtship behaviour in jumping spiders. This research has shown that genetic links between certain courtship behaviours can be seen within species, which has an impact on our understanding of evolution.

==== Sepsidae Research ====
Working within international scientific programmes, Su's research into the evolution of sepsid flies, has a particular emphasis on functional change and sexual dimorphism in sepsid species. Her research has shown how abdominal appendages in sepsid flies developed and how they are influenced by histoblast nest size. How mounting position can produce sexual dimorphisms in sepsid flies. How and why genetically fly pigmentation emerged and diverged. How site specific mutations can cause produce contradictory phenotypes as a process in evolution.

== Awards ==
2014–Present	Lee Kuan Yew Postdoctoral Fellowship
2013	EDEN Research Exchange Grant
2010 - 2011	ARC Foundation for cancer research
2007 - 2010	French Ministry of Higher Education and Research Award
2007	Brundin Award, student presentation prize at the 26th Annual Willi Hennig Society Meeting, New Orleans, USA
