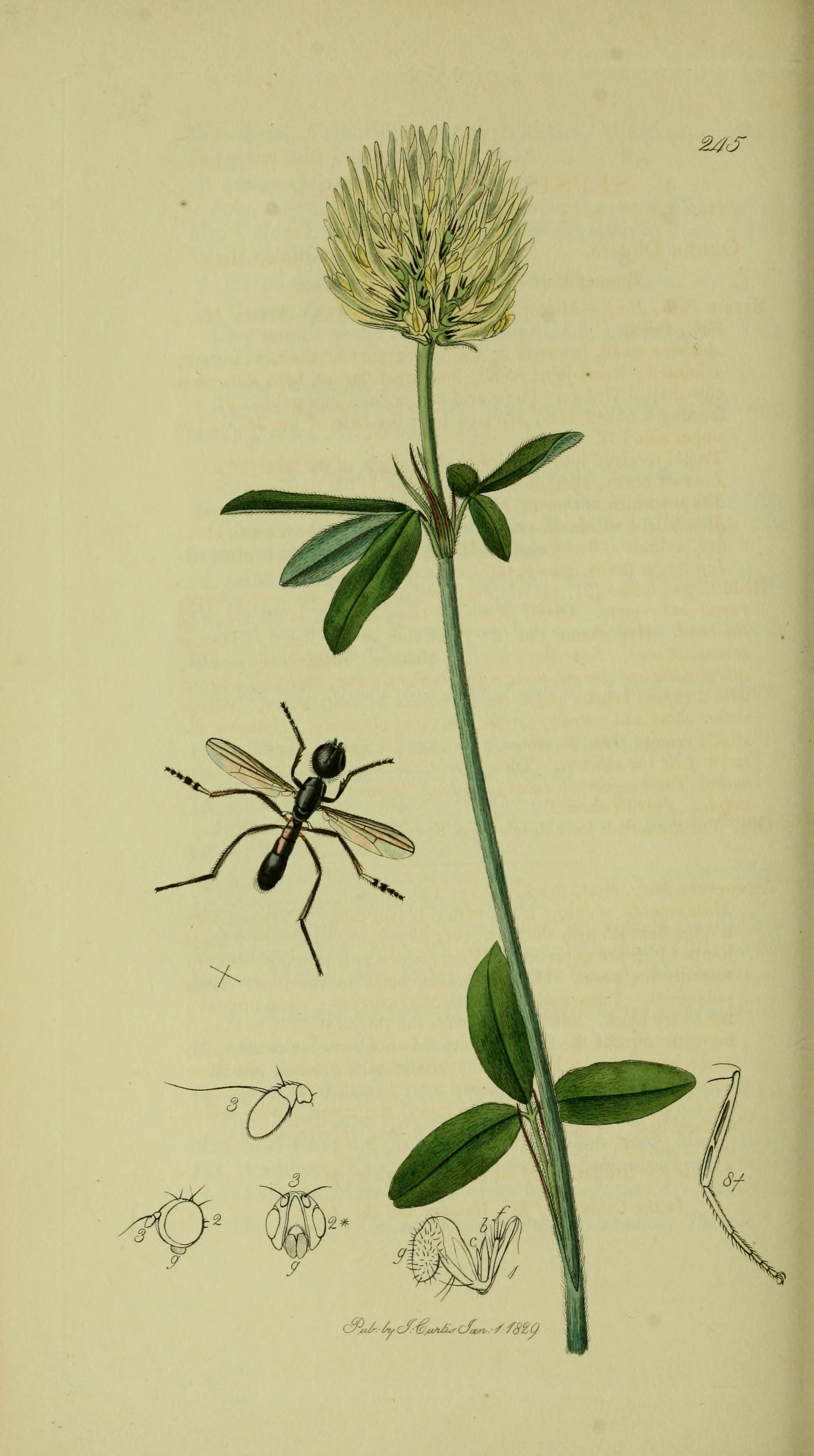

Scientific classification
- Kingdom: Animalia
- Phylum: Arthropoda
- Class: Insecta
- Order: Diptera
- Family: Sepsidae
- Subfamily: Sepsinae
- Genus: Themira
- Species: T. annulipes

Binomial name
- Themira annulipes (Meigen, 1826)

Synonyms
- Sepsis annulipes Meigen, 1826; Nemopoda brunicosa Robineau-Desvoidy, 1830; Nemopoda varipes Meigen, 1838; Sepsis marginata Hoffmeister, 1844; Enicita elegantipes Ouellet, 1940

= Themira annulipes =

Species of fly

Themira annulipes is a European species of fly and member of the family Sepsidae.
