= Palaeosepsioides =

Scientific classification
- Kingdom: Animalia
- Phylum: Arthropoda
- Clade: Pancrustacea
- Class: Insecta
- Order: Diptera
- Family: Sepsidae
- Subfamily: Sepsinae
- Genus: Palaeosepsioides; Ozerov, 1992

Type species
- Palaeosepsioides grimaldii Ozerov, 1992

Genus of flies

Palaeosepsioides is a genus of flies in the family Sepsidae.

== Species ==
- Palaeosepsioides erythromyrma (Silva, 1992)
- Palaeosepsioides marshalli Ozerov, 2004
- Palaeosepsioides neotropicanus Ozerov, 2004
