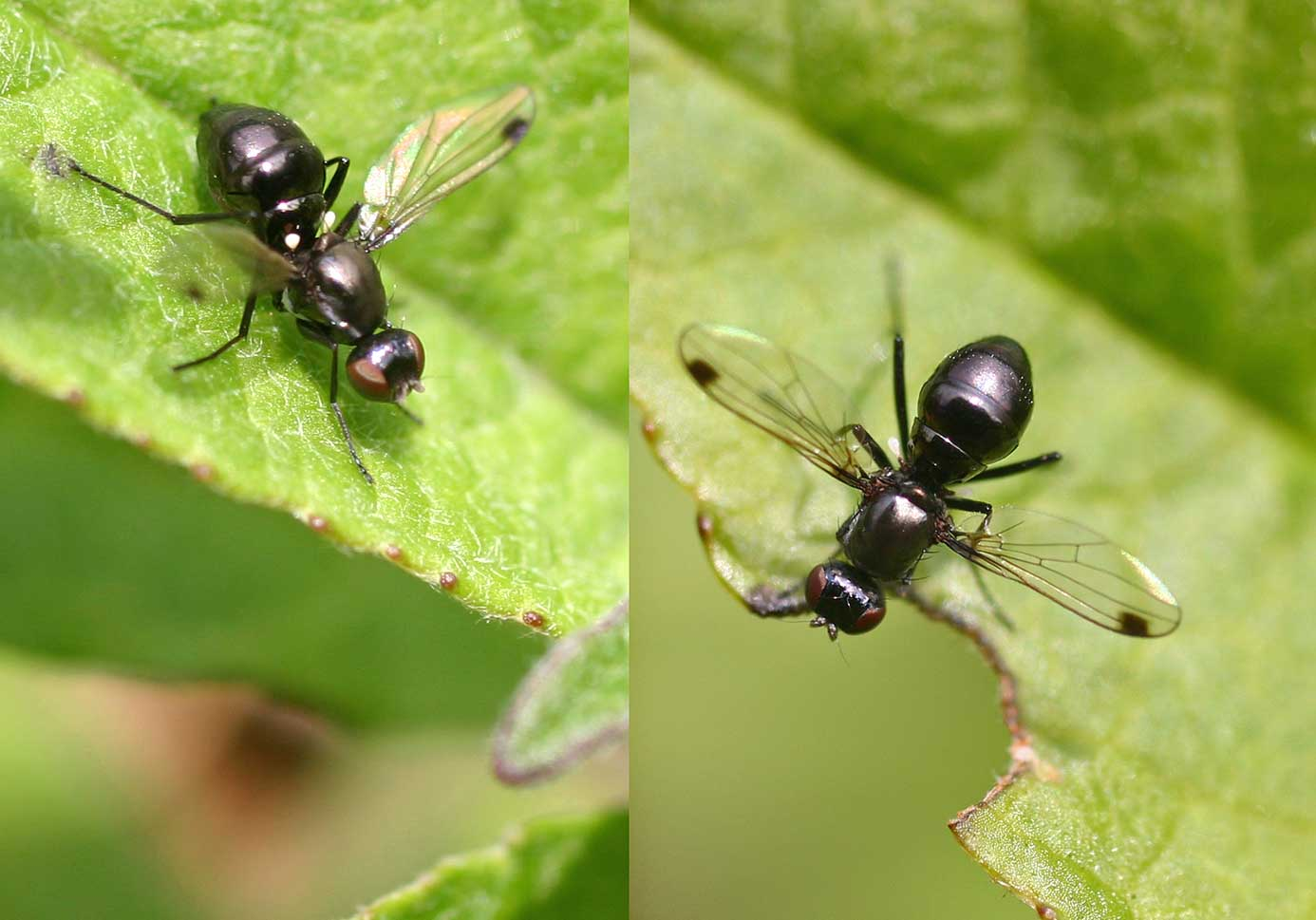
- Sepsis fulgens

Scientific classification
- Kingdom: Animalia
- Phylum: Arthropoda
- Clade: Pancrustacea
- Class: Insecta
- Order: Diptera
- Family: Sepsidae
- Subfamily: Sepsinae
- Genus: Sepsis; Fallén, 1810

Type species
- Musca cynipsea Linnaeus, 1758

Synonyms
- Sepsidimorpha Frey, 1908; Threx Gistl, 1848; Allosepsis Ozerov, 1992; Beggiatia Lioy, 1864

= Sepsis (fly) =

Genus of flies

Sepsis is a genus of flies in the family Sepsidae.

== Species ==
- S. barbata Becker, 1907
- S. biflexuosa Strobl, 1893
- S. cynipsea (Linnaeus, 1758)
- S. duplicata Haliday, 1838
- S. fissa Becker, 1903
- S. flavimana Meigen, 1826
- S. fulgens Meigen, 1826
- S. geniculata Bigot, 1891
- S. lateralis Wiedemann, 1830
- S. luteipes Melander & Spuler, 1917
- S. macrochaetophora Duda, 1926
- S. neglecta Ozerov, 1986
- S. neocynipsea Melander & Spuler, 1917
- S. nigripes Meigen, 1826
- S. niveipennis Becker, 1903
- S. orthocnemis Frey, 1908
- S. pseudomonostigma Urso, 1969
- S. punctum (Fabricius, 1794)
- S. pyrrhosoma Melander & Spuler 1917
- S. setulosa (Duda, 1926)
- S. spura Ang & Meier, 2010
- S. thoracica (Robineau-Desvoidy, 1830)
- S. violacea Meigen, 1826
- S. zuskai Iwasa, 1982

== See also ==
- List of sepsid fly species recorded in Europe
