= Toxopoda =

Scientific classification
- Kingdom: Animalia
- Phylum: Arthropoda
- Clade: Pancrustacea
- Class: Insecta
- Order: Diptera
- Family: Sepsidae
- Subfamily: Sepsinae
- Genus: Toxopoda; Macquart, 1851

Type species
- Toxopoda nitida Macquart, 1851

Synonyms
- Amydrosoma Becker, 1903; Platychiria Enderlein, 1922; Platychirella Hedicke, 1923; Podanema Malloch, 1928; Platytoxopoda Curran, 1929; Afrotoxopoda Vanschuytbroeck, 1961

Genus of flies

Toxopoda is a genus of flies in the family Sepsidae.

== Species ==
- Toxopoda ainne (Vanschuytbroeck, 1961)
- Toxopoda angulata Iwasa, 2008
- Toxopoda asymmetrica Ozerov, 1992
- Toxopoda atrata (Malloch, 1928)
- Toxopoda au Ozerov, 1998
- Toxopoda bequaerti (Curran, 1929)
- Toxopoda cavata Iwasa, 2008
- Toxopoda contracta (Walker, 1853)
- Toxopoda elephantina Iwasa, 2008
- Toxopoda fasciventris Bezzi, 1920
- Toxopoda haladai Ozerov, 2018
- Toxopoda malayana Iwasa, 2008
- Toxopoda mordax Iwasa, Zuska & Ozerov, 1991
- Toxopoda nigrifoveata Ozerov, 1991
- Toxopoda nitida Macquart, 1851
- Toxopoda nuceria (Séguy, 1938)
- Toxopoda ozerovi Iwasa, 2008
- Toxopoda papuensis Iwasa, 2001
- Toxopoda pseudoviduata Ozerov, 2010
- Toxopoda saegeri Vanschuytbroeck, 1961
- Toxopoda shinonagai Iwasa, 1986
- Toxopoda simplex Iwasa, 1986
- Toxopoda soror (Munari, 1994)
- Toxopoda sulawesiensis Iwasa, 1999
- Toxopoda vanschuytbroecki Ozerov, 1991
- Toxopoda viduata (Thomson, 1869)
- Toxopoda vikhrei Ozerov & Iwasa, 2008
