= Sepsis flavimana =

Scientific classification
- Kingdom: Animalia
- Phylum: Arthropoda
- Class: Insecta
- Order: Diptera
- Family: Sepsidae
- Subfamily: Sepsinae
- Genus: Sepsis
- Species: S. flavimana

Binomial name
- Sepsis flavimana (Meigen, 1826)

Synonyms
- Sepsis maculipes Walker, 1833; Sepsis ruficornis Meigen, 1826

Species of fly

Sepsis flavimana is a European species of flies and member of the family Sepsidae.
