= Microsepsis =

Scientific classification
- Kingdom: Animalia
- Phylum: Arthropoda
- Clade: Pancrustacea
- Class: Insecta
- Order: Diptera
- Family: Sepsidae
- Subfamily: Sepsinae
- Genus: Microsepsis; Silva, 1993

Type species
- Sepsis armillata Melander, & Spuler, 1917

Synonyms
- Ajdasepsis Ozerov, 1994

Genus of flies

Microsepsis is a genus of flies in the family Sepsidae.

== Species ==
- Microsepsis armillata (Melander, & Spuler, 1917)
- Microsepsis currani (Ozerov, 1993)
- Microsepsis fulva (Ozerov, 1994)
- Microsepsis furcata (Melander, & Spuler, 1917)
- Microsepsis limnetica (Ozerov, 1993)
- Microsepsis mitis (Curran, 1927)
- Microsepsis pilosicoxa (Ozerov, 1993)
- Microsepsis stenoptera Silva, 1993
- Microsepsis steyskali (Ozerov, 1993)
