= Xenosepsis =

Scientific classification
- Kingdom: Animalia
- Phylum: Arthropoda
- Clade: Pancrustacea
- Class: Insecta
- Order: Diptera
- Family: Sepsidae
- Subfamily: Sepsinae
- Genus: Xenosepsis; Malloch, 1925

Type species
- Xenosepsis sydneyensis Malloch, 1925

Synonyms
- Pseudomeroplius Duda, 1926

Genus of flies

Xenosepsis is a genus of flies in the family Sepsidae.

== Species ==
- Xenosepsis africana (Ozerov, 1999)
- Xenosepsis fukuharai Iwasa, 1984
- Xenosepsis sydneyensis Malloch, 1925
