= Nemopoda pectinulata =

Scientific classification
- Kingdom: Animalia
- Phylum: Arthropoda
- Class: Insecta
- Order: Diptera
- Family: Sepsidae
- Genus: Nemopoda
- Species: N. pectinulata

Binomial name
- Nemopoda pectinulata Loew, 1873

Species of fly

Nemopoda pectinulata is a European species of flies and member of the family Sepsidae.
