= Afronemopoda =

Scientific classification
- Kingdom: Animalia
- Phylum: Arthropoda
- Clade: Pancrustacea
- Class: Insecta
- Order: Diptera
- Family: Sepsidae
- Subfamily: Sepsinae
- Genus: Afronemopoda; Ozerov, 2004

Type species
- Nemopoda semlikiensis Vanschuytbroeck, 1962

Genus of flies

Afronemopoda is a genus of flies in the family Sepsidae.

== Species ==
- Afronemopoda ealaensis (Vanschuytbroeck, 1962)
