= Brachythoracosepsis =

Scientific classification
- Kingdom: Animalia
- Phylum: Arthropoda
- Clade: Pancrustacea
- Class: Insecta
- Order: Diptera
- Family: Sepsidae
- Subfamily: Sepsinae
- Genus: Brachythoracosepsis; Ozerov, 1996

Type species
- Sepsis nodosa Walker, 1849

Genus of flies

Brachythoracosepsis is a genus of flies in the family Sepsidae.

== Species ==
- Brachythoracosepsis butikensis (Vanschuytbroeck, 1963)
- Brachythoracosepsis freidbergi Ozerov, 1996
- Brachythoracosepsis nodosa (Walker, 1849)
- Brachythoracosepsis pseudonotosa (Ozerov, 1990)
- Brachythoracosepsis rossii (Munari, 1982)
- Brachythoracosepsis ruanoliensis (Vanschuytbroeck, 1963)
- Brachythoracosepsis saothomensis Ozerov, 2000
