= Decachaetophora =

Scientific classification
- Kingdom: Animalia
- Phylum: Arthropoda
- Clade: Pancrustacea
- Class: Insecta
- Order: Diptera
- Family: Sepsidae
- Subfamily: Sepsinae
- Genus: Decachaetophora; Duda, 1926

Type species
- Sepsis aeneipes Meijere, 1913

Genus of flies

Decachaetophora is a genus of flies in the family Sepsidae.

== Species ==
- Decachaetophora aeneipes (Meijere, 1913)
