= Afromeroplius =

Scientific classification
- Kingdom: Animalia
- Phylum: Arthropoda
- Clade: Pancrustacea
- Class: Insecta
- Order: Diptera
- Family: Sepsidae
- Subfamily: Sepsinae
- Genus: Afromeroplius; Ozerov, 1996

Type species
- Sepsis semlikiensis Vanschuytbroeck, 1963

Genus of flies

Afromeroplius is a genus of flies in the family Sepsidae.

== Species ==
- Afromeroplius semlikiensis (Vanschuytbroeck, 1963)
- Afromeroplius watalingaensis (Vanschuytbroeck, 1963)
