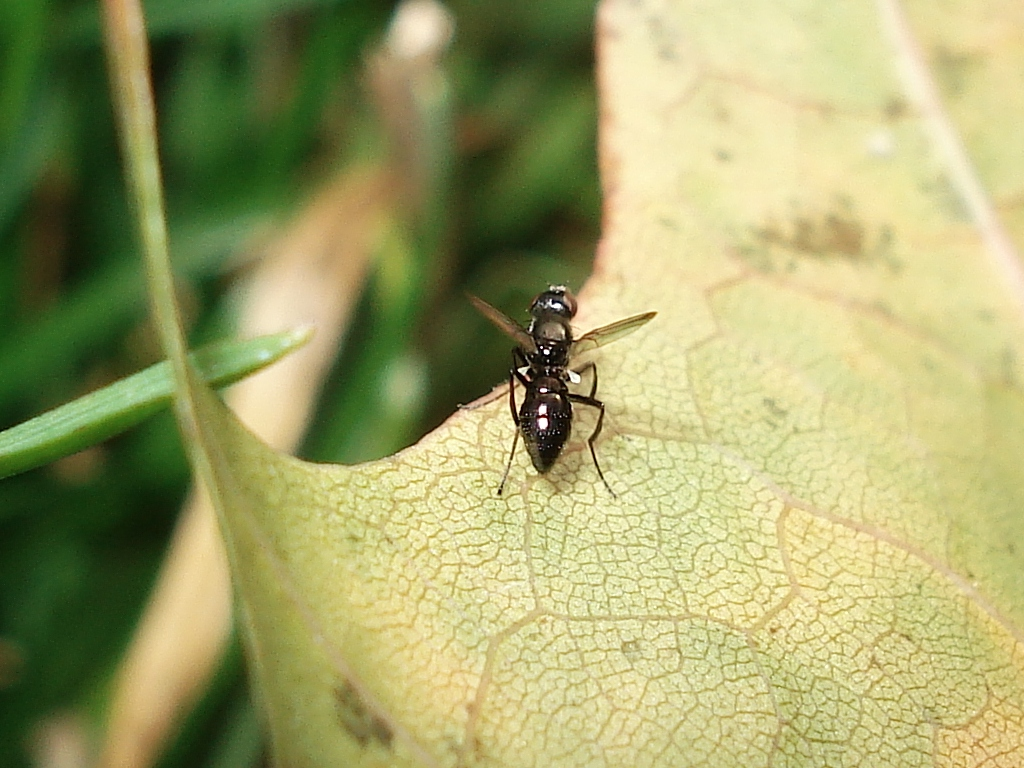

Scientific classification
- Kingdom: Animalia
- Phylum: Arthropoda
- Class: Insecta
- Order: Diptera
- Family: Sepsidae
- Genus: Nemopoda
- Species: N. nitidula

Binomial name
- Nemopoda nitidula (Fallén, 1820)

Synonyms
- Musca cylindrica Fabricius, 1794; Nemopoda cylindrica (Fabricius, 1794); Nemopoda putris Robineau-Desvoidy, 1830; Sepsis nitidula Fallén, 1820

= Nemopoda nitidula =

Species of fly

Nemopoda nitidula is a European species of flies and member of the family Sepsidae.
