= Parapalaeosepsis =

Scientific classification
- Kingdom: Animalia
- Phylum: Arthropoda
- Clade: Pancrustacea
- Class: Insecta
- Order: Diptera
- Family: Sepsidae
- Subfamily: Sepsinae
- Genus: Parapalaeosepsis; Duda, 1926

Type species
- Sepsis plebeia Meijere, 1906

Synonyms
- Poecilopterosepsis Duda, 1926

Genus of flies

Parapalaeosepsis is a genus of flies in the family Sepsidae.

== Species ==
- Parapalaeosepsis apicalis (Meijere, 1906)
- Parapalaeosepsis basifera (Walker, 1859)
- Parapalaeosepsis compressa Zuska, 1970
- Parapalaeosepsis laffooni Steyskal, 1949
- Parapalaeosepsis limbata (Meijere, 1906)
- Parapalaeosepsis mesopla Steyskal, 1949
- Parapalaeosepsis plebeia (Meijere, 1906)
- Parapalaeosepsis ploskolapka Ozerov, 2004
- Parapalaeosepsis spatulata Zuska, 1970
