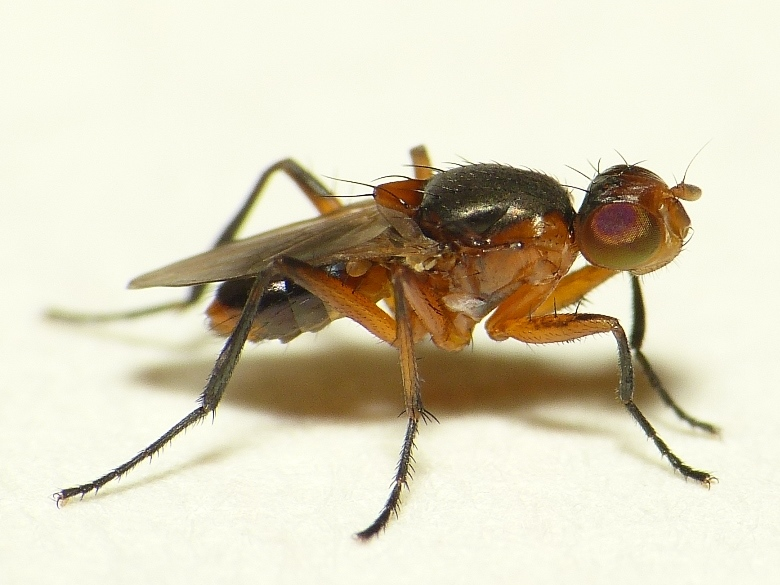
- Saltella sphondylii

Scientific classification
- Kingdom: Animalia
- Phylum: Arthropoda
- Clade: Pancrustacea
- Class: Insecta
- Order: Diptera
- Family: Sepsidae
- Subfamily: Sepsinae
- Genus: Saltella; Robineau-Desvoidy, 1830

Type species
- Saltella nigripes Robineau-Desvoidy, 1830

Synonyms
- Pandora Haliday, 1833; Brachygaster Meigen, 1826; Pseudopandora Rapp, 1946; Anisophysa Macquart, 1835

= Saltella =

Genus of flies

Saltella is a genus of flies in the family Sepsidae.

== Species ==
- Saltella bezzii (Duda, 1926)
- Saltella nigripes Robineau-Desvoidy, 1830
- Saltella orientalis (Hendel, 1934)
- Saltella setigera Brunetti, 1910
- Saltella sphondylii (Schrank, 1803)

== See also ==
- List of sepsid fly species recorded in Europe
