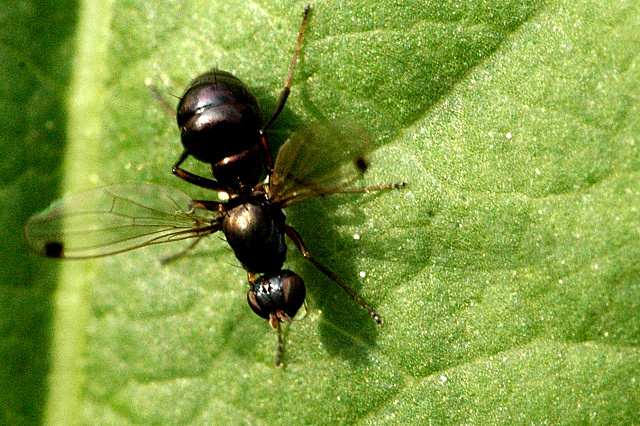

Scientific classification
- Kingdom: Animalia
- Phylum: Arthropoda
- Class: Insecta
- Order: Diptera
- Family: Sepsidae
- Subfamily: Sepsinae
- Genus: Sepsis
- Species: S. violacea

Binomial name
- Sepsis violacea (Meigen, 1826)

Synonyms
- Sepsis ciliforceps Duda, 1926

= Sepsis violacea =

Species of fly

Sepsis violacea is a European species of flies and member of the family Sepsidae.
