= Meropliosepsis =

Scientific classification
- Kingdom: Animalia
- Phylum: Arthropoda
- Clade: Pancrustacea
- Class: Insecta
- Order: Diptera
- Family: Sepsidae
- Subfamily: Sepsinae
- Genus: Meropliosepsis; Duda, 1926
- Species: M. sexsetosa

Binomial name
- Meropliosepsis sexsetosa Duda, 1926

Genus of flies

Meropliosepsis is a genus of flies in the family Sepsidae. The genus contains the single species Meropliosepsis sexsetosa.
