= Dudamira =

Scientific classification
- Kingdom: Animalia
- Phylum: Arthropoda
- Clade: Pancrustacea
- Class: Insecta
- Order: Diptera
- Family: Sepsidae
- Subfamily: Sepsinae
- Genus: Dudamira; Ozerov, 1996

Type species
- Sepsis abyssinica Duda, 1926

Genus of flies

Dudamira is a genus of flies in the family Sepsidae.

== Species ==
- Dudamira abyssinica (Duda, 1926)
