= Paratoxopoda =

Scientific classification
- Kingdom: Animalia
- Phylum: Arthropoda
- Clade: Pancrustacea
- Class: Insecta
- Order: Diptera
- Family: Sepsidae
- Subfamily: Sepsinae
- Genus: Paratoxopoda; Duda, 1926

Type species
- Sepsis depilis Walker, 1849

Synonyms
- Afrotoxopoda Vanschuytbroeck, 1961

Genus of flies

Paratoxopoda is a genus of flies in the family Sepsidae.

== Species ==
- Paratoxopoda abyssinica Ozerov, 2004
- Paratoxopoda akuminambili Vanschuytbroeck, 1961
- Paratoxopoda akuminamoya Vanschuytbroeck, 1961
- Paratoxopoda amonane Vanschuytbroeck, 1961
- Paratoxopoda angolica Ozerov, 1993
- Paratoxopoda asaba Vanschuytbroeck, 1961
- Paratoxopoda asita Vanschuytbroeck, 1961
- Paratoxopoda barbata Ozerov, 1993
- Paratoxopoda crassiforceps Duda, 1926
- Paratoxopoda depilis (Walker, 1849)
- Paratoxopoda frontalis Ozerov, 1993
- Paratoxopoda glabra Ozerov, 1993
- Paratoxopoda intermedia Duda, 1926
- Paratoxopoda kilinderensis (Vanschuytbroeck, 1963)
- Paratoxopoda magna Ozerov, 1993
- Paratoxopoda mystacea Ozerov, 2018
- Paratoxopoda nigritarsis Duda, 1926
- Paratoxopoda pelengensis Vanschuytbroeck, 1963
- Paratoxopoda pilifemorata Soós, 1964
- Paratoxopoda rufithorax Ozerov, 1993
- Paratoxopoda rufiventris Ozerov, 1996
- Paratoxopoda saegeri (Vanschuytbroeck, 1961)
- Paratoxopoda similis Ozerov, 1993
- Paratoxopoda straeleni Vanschuytbroeck, 1961
- Paratoxopoda tenebrica Ozerov, 1993
- Paratoxopoda tricolor (Walker, 1849)
- Paratoxopoda varicoxa Curran, 1929
- Paratoxopoda villicoxa Duda, 1926
- Paratoxopoda zuskai Ozerov, 1993
