= Themira nigricornis =

Scientific classification
- Kingdom: Animalia
- Phylum: Arthropoda
- Class: Insecta
- Order: Diptera
- Family: Sepsidae
- Subfamily: Sepsinae
- Genus: Themira
- Species: T. nigricornis

Binomial name
- Themira nigricornis (Meigen, 1826)

Synonyms
- Sepsis nigricornis Meigen, 1826

Species of fly

Themira nigricornis is a species of black scavenger fly in the family Sepsidae. It is found in Europe.
