= Adriapontia =

Scientific classification
- Kingdom: Animalia
- Phylum: Arthropoda
- Clade: Pancrustacea
- Class: Insecta
- Order: Diptera
- Family: Sepsidae
- Subfamily: Sepsinae
- Genus: Adriapontia; Ozerov, 1996

Type species
- Sepsis capensis Hennig, 1960

Genus of flies

Adriapontia is a genus of flies in the family Sepsidae.

== Species ==
- Adriapontia aethiopica Ozerov, 2000
- Adriapontia capensis (Hennig, 1960)
- Adriapontia freidbergi Ozerov, 2000
- Adriapontia ihongeroensis (Vanschuytbroeck, 1963)
- Adriapontia kyanyamaensis (Vanschuytbroeck, 1963)
- Adriapontia tanzanica Ozerov, 2000
- Adriapontia ugandica Ozerov, 2000
