= Pseudonemopoda =

Scientific classification
- Kingdom: Animalia
- Phylum: Arthropoda
- Clade: Pancrustacea
- Class: Insecta
- Order: Diptera
- Family: Sepsidae
- Subfamily: Sepsinae
- Genus: Pseudonemopoda; Duda, 1926

Type species
- Pseudonemopoda speiseri Duda, 1926

Genus of flies

Pseudonemopoda is a genus of flies in the family Sepsidae.

== Species ==
- Pseudonemopoda annamensis Ozerov & Krivosheina, 2012
- Pseudonemopoda speiseri Duda, 1926
