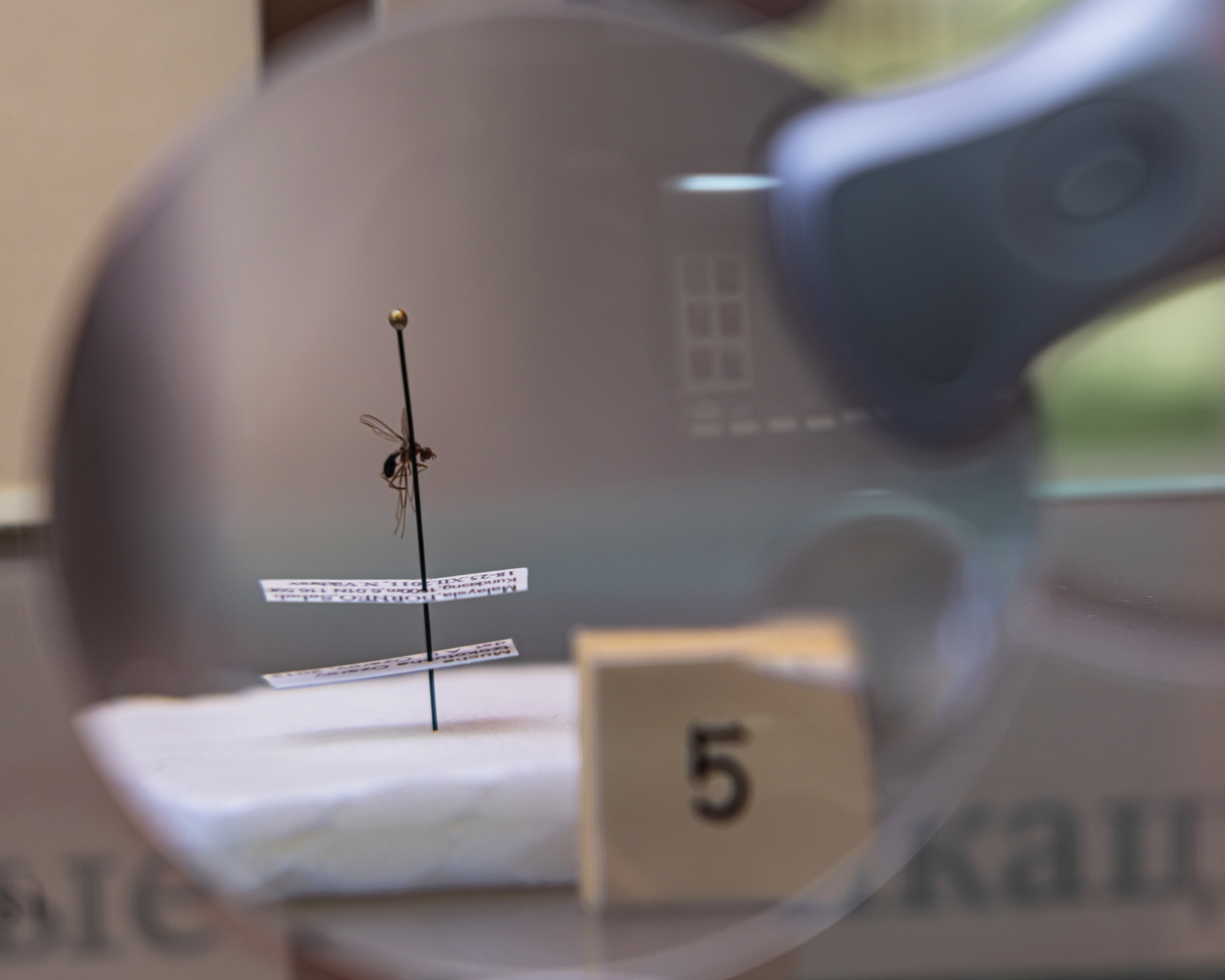
- Specimen of Mucha tzokotucha

Scientific classification
- Kingdom: Animalia
- Phylum: Arthropoda
- Clade: Pancrustacea
- Class: Insecta
- Order: Diptera
- Family: Sepsidae
- Subfamily: Sepsinae
- Genus: Mucha; Ozerov, 1992

Type species
- Mucha tzokotucha Ozerov, 1992

= Mucha (fly) =

Genus of flies

Mucha is a genus of flies in the family Sepsidae.

== Species ==
- Mucha liangi Li & Yang, 2014
- Mucha plumosa Ozerov, 2012
- Mucha rectotibialis Iwasa, 2012
- Mucha tzokotucha Ozerov, 1992
- Mucha yunnanensis Li & Yang, 2014
