= Lasiosepsis =

Scientific classification
- Kingdom: Animalia
- Phylum: Arthropoda
- Clade: Pancrustacea
- Class: Insecta
- Order: Diptera
- Family: Sepsidae
- Subfamily: Sepsinae
- Genus: Lasiosepsis; Duda, 1926

Type species
- Sepsis hirtipes Becker, 1903

Genus of flies

Lasiosepsis is a genus of flies in the family Sepsidae.

== Species ==
- Lasiosepsis melanota (Bigot, 1886)
- Lasiosepsis melanota (Duda, 1926)
