= Australosepsis =

Scientific classification
- Kingdom: Animalia
- Phylum: Arthropoda
- Clade: Pancrustacea
- Class: Insecta
- Order: Diptera
- Family: Sepsidae
- Subfamily: Sepsinae
- Genus: Australosepsis; Malloch, 1925

Type species
- Australosepsis fulvescens Malloch, 1925

Synonyms
- Saltelliseps Duda, 1926

Genus of flies

Australosepsis is a genus of flies in the family Sepsidae.

== Species ==
- Australosepsis frontalis (Walker, 1860)
- Australosepsis inusitata Iwasa, 2008
- Australosepsis niveipennis (Becker, 1903)
