= Palaeosepsis =

Scientific classification
- Kingdom: Animalia
- Phylum: Arthropoda
- Clade: Pancrustacea
- Class: Insecta
- Order: Diptera
- Family: Sepsidae
- Subfamily: Sepsinae
- Genus: Palaeosepsis; Duda, 1926

Type species
- Sepsis dentata Becker, 1919

Genus of flies

Palaeosepsis is a genus of flies in the family Sepsidae.

== Species ==
- Palaeosepsis bucki Ozerov, 2004
- Palaeosepsis chauliobrechma Silva, 1993
- Palaeosepsis dentata (Becker, 1919)
- Palaeosepsis dentatiformis (Duda, 1926)
- Palaeosepsis eberhardi Ozerov, 2004
- Palaeosepsis golovastik Ozerov, 2004
- Palaeosepsis maculata (Duda, 1926)
- Palaeosepsis morula Ozerov, 2004
- Palaeosepsis punctulata Ozerov, 2004
