= Sepsis biflexuosa =

Scientific classification
- Kingdom: Animalia
- Phylum: Arthropoda
- Class: Insecta
- Order: Diptera
- Family: Sepsidae
- Subfamily: Sepsinae
- Genus: Sepsis
- Species: S. biflexuosa

Binomial name
- Sepsis biflexuosa Strobl, 1893

Synonyms
- Sepsis signifera Melander & Spuler, 1917; Sepsis desultor Séguy, 1932

Species of fly

Sepsis biflexuosa is a Cosmopolitan species of fly and member of the family Sepsidae.
