= Sepsis thoracica =

Scientific classification
- Kingdom: Animalia
- Phylum: Arthropoda
- Class: Insecta
- Order: Diptera
- Family: Sepsidae
- Subfamily: Sepsinae
- Genus: Sepsis
- Species: S. thoracica

Binomial name
- Sepsis thoracica (Robineau-Desvoidy, 1830)

Synonyms
- Micropeza thoracica Robineau-Desvoidy, 1830; Sepsis tridens Becker, 1903; Sepsis propinquus Adams, 1905; Sepsis modesta Meijere, 1906; Sepsis consanguinea Villeneuve, 1920; Sepsis goetghebueri Frey, 1925; Sepsis quadratipunctata Brunetti, 1929; Sepsis longisetosa Brunetti, 1929; Sepsis idmais Séguy, 1932; Sepsis ino Séguy, 932: Sepsis inermis Séguy, 1933; Sepsis longiseta Vanschuytbroeck, 1961; Sepsis quadripunctata Vanschuytbroeck, 1961; Sepsis kamahoroensis Vanschuytbroeck, 1963

Species of fly

Sepsis thoracica, more commonly known as the black scavenger fly, a species of fly from the genus Sepsis and the family Sepsidae. It was discovered by Robineau-Desvoidy in 1830. It resembles a small flying ant. The fly is most commonly found inhabiting cow dung.

Sepsis thoracica shows positive directional selection in body size that corresponds with negative selection of melanism. In addition, body size and coloration are coupled via gene regulation. A hypothesized mechanism is through the enzyme phenoloxidase.

== Description ==
Sepsis thoracica is a relatively small fly (often described as ant-like), averaging 5 mm in length and 0.75 mm in width. They have a rounded head with compound eyes. The last segment of the body contains short, silver hair. Their wings are mostly transparent with dark spots towards the ends. The developmental temperature influences their body size, in accordance with the temperature-size rule. Females are completely black and smaller than males.

=== Male polymorphism ===
Males can be either black or amber, a coloration that is usually only observed in more tropical species. S. thoracica is the only fly of the genus Sepsis to exhibit this male polymorphism in relation to size. While males can be a spectrum of colors between black and amber, most are usually one of the extremes.

Thermal radiation, which is the long-waves emitted by the atmosphere, is important in the development of S. thoracica because the

== Distribution ==
Sepsis thoracica has a wide distribution. It is mainly found in Europe, particularly in the United Kingdom, extending as far north as Denmark and southern Sweden. It is also in Afrotropical and Australasian regions. It has most recently been found in Vietnam and South Korea. It is mostly dispersed near the coasts and at high elevations in mountain ranges.

== Habitat ==
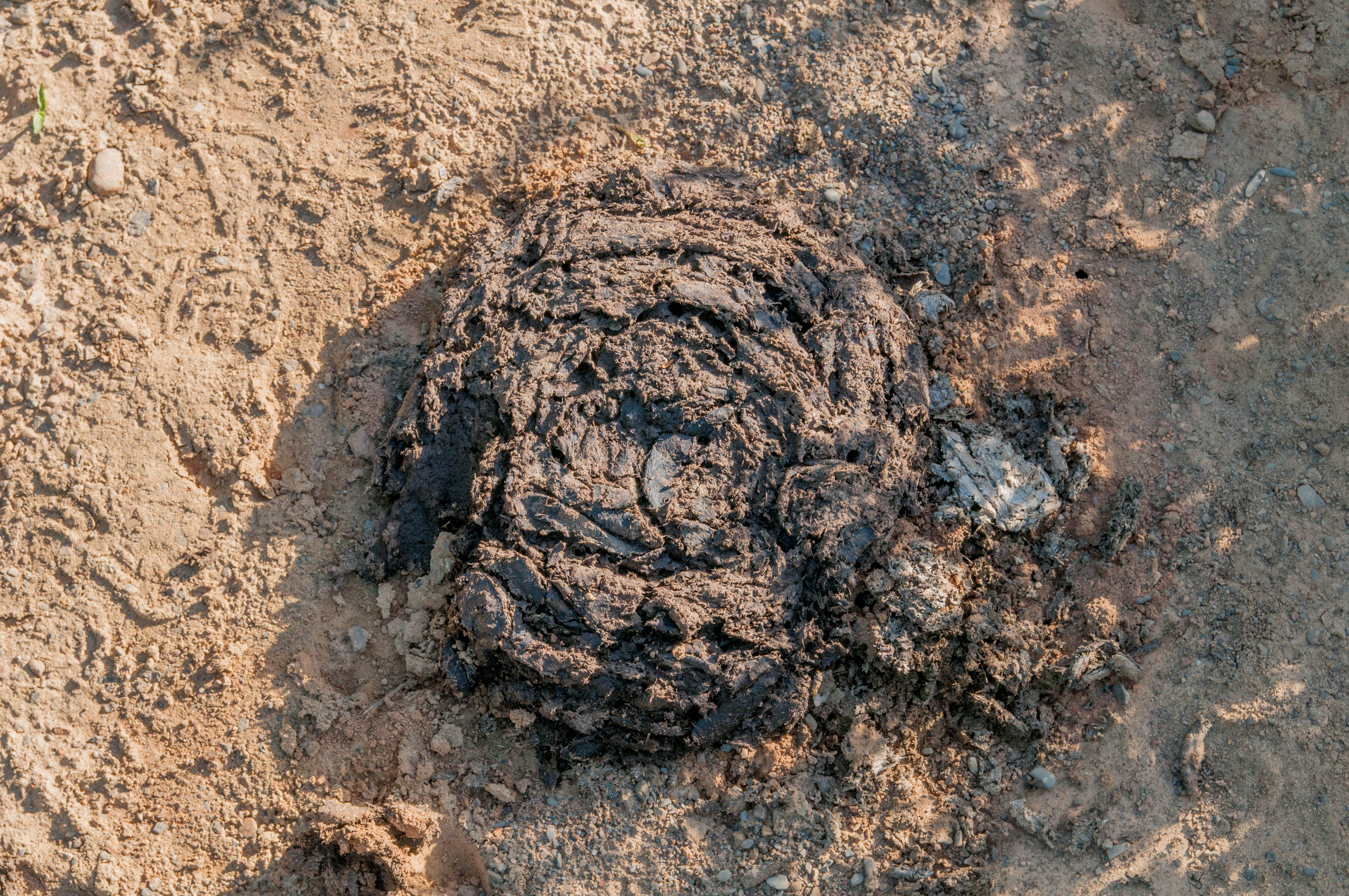
Cow Dung

Sepsis thoracica is a dung fly and prefers cow dung and buffalo dung, especially in human-managed agricultural grasslands. However, the flies typically avoid horse dung. They are a tropical and subtropical species that are extremely heliophilic, or attracted to sun. They are most active between the months of July and October.

== Life history ==
Females deposit their eggs into the dung. The larvae are not able to escape this during development and thus the flies only leave when they are adults. The larvae are amphipneustic, meaning that both their first and last spiracles are functional. The two spiracle pairs of the respiratory system are on the prothorax and the posterior of the abdomen. The developmental time of the larvae is four days and five hours, optimally at a temperature of 26-28 °C. In cow dung, 15–22 days marks the total developmental time. These flies enter dormancy in response to dropping temperatures.

== Food resources ==
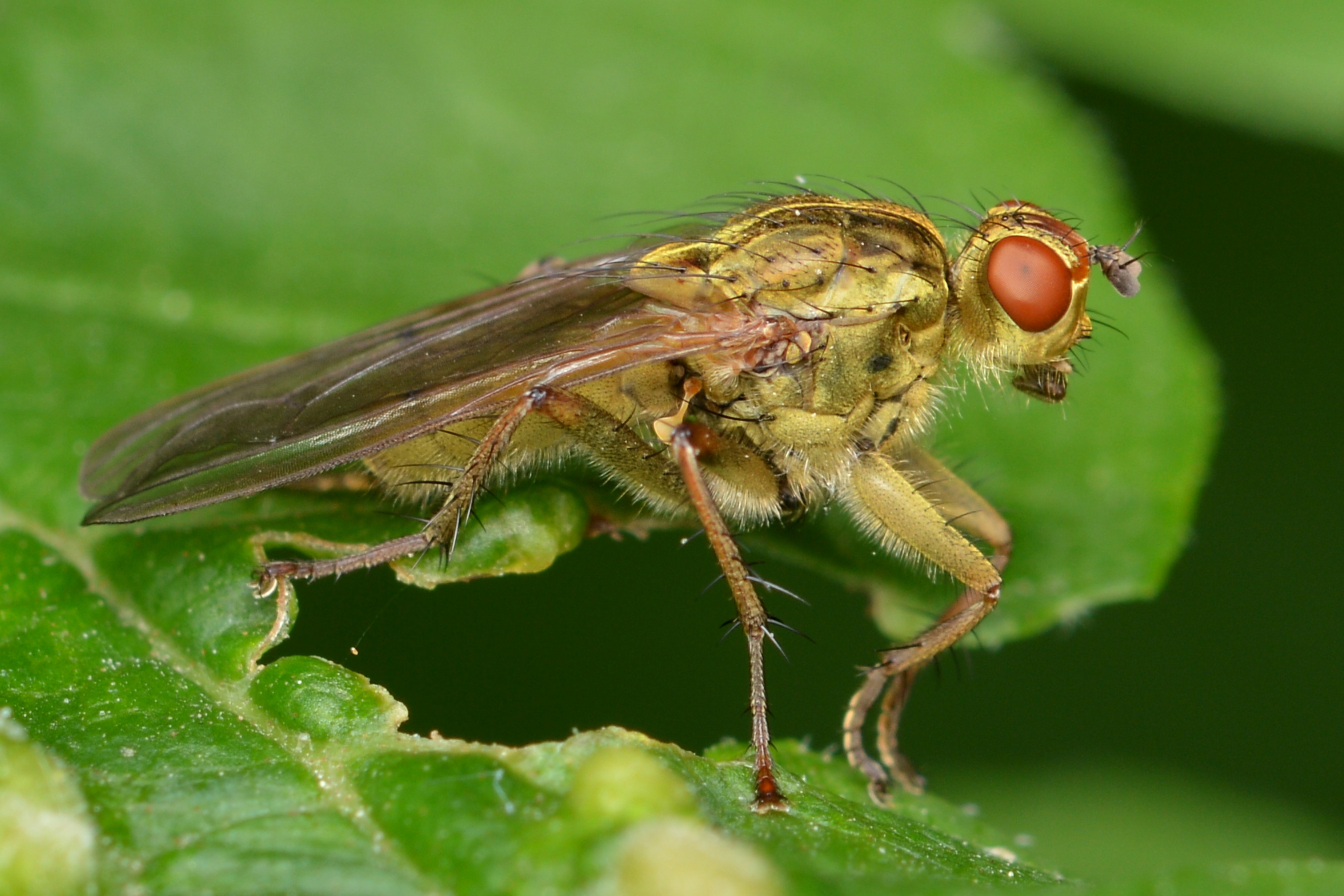
Sc. stercoraria

They spend a considerable amount of their life foraging for nectar and their insect prey, Sc. stercoraria. They feed on dung for protein and nectar for carbohydrates. While they are found to mostly feed on cow dung, they have been shown to feed on horse dung if it is available in their area. The competitor density they face largely depends on the amount of eggs laid in the dung pat from which they emerged. They don't face much outside species competition.

== Mating ==
=== Sexual selection ===
Sepsis thoracica has shown a strong, positive directional selection on body size that coincides with a strong negative selection of melanism. The dichotomous coloration is thought to have evolved as a way to indicate their size and fitness. The purity of amber color relating to size was most likely maintained due to the cost it retains from reduced immunity. This causes a trait threshold, where only the largest individuals in a competitive environment can afford to be amber. The larger, amber-colored males are favored by females over the small, black males. However, black males have greater success than mid-sized, mid-toned males. Mating practices do not differ between males of different colors, but reproductive fitness is higher in the larger, amber males,

=== Copulation ===
Sepsis thoracica does not exhibit any pre or post-copulatory guarding in Europe, but it does have pre-copulatory guarding in more tropical areas, such as Zimbabwe. This mating behavior occurred on the dung pat, with males scrambling and competing for the exceedingly rare single females. Male rejection and struggle behavior does occur. When a mate is found, copulations take place in the nearby vegetation. S. thoracica has relatively long copulation and guarding durations, similar to S. cynipsea.

== Enemies ==
Sepsis thoracica faces mostly generalist predators in their pastoral habitat. Vertebrates include birds, Lacerta lizards, and amphibians when close enough to ponds. The main predators are terrestrial invertebrates, like spiders and insects, primarily other flies and wasps. When dealing with vertebrate predators, black S. thoracica have a greater advantage over amber-colored flies. When encountering an invertebrate predator, being larger is more advantageous than being black. Since S. thoracica is most likely to encounter an invertebrate predator, size is the best defense mechanism for S. thoracica.

== Genetics ==
Body size and coloration are coupled together, likely via gene regulation. They have been shown to be functionally linked through the enzyme phenoloxidase, which works in the phenoloxidase system. This system is the main immunological defense system of S. thoracica. The reduction in melanin conforms with lower amounts of phenoloxidase, which compromises the immune system. This causes larger, amber individuals to be immunocompromised. This polymorphism is seen in related species such as Saltella sphondylii, implying a more general evolutionary relevance.

== Physiology ==
=== Thermal radiation ===
Thermal radiation, which is the long-waves emitted by the atmosphere, is important in the development of S. thoracica because the dung on which the flies eat absorbs most of the short-wave radiation from the sun because of its dark color. This causes the dung to emit long-wave radiation which is absorbed by the flies. The amount of long-wave absorbance does not differ based on the amount of melanism because it's out of melanin's spectrum; consequently, absorption relies only on size. Larger individuals thus absorb the most radiation but also have a lower heat-exchange rate with the environment due to its low surface volume ratio. Larger flies retain more heat and are more prone to overheating. This can be compensated by lower melanism, which absorbs the short-wave radiation. The reduction in short-wave radiation can negate the effects of the long-wave radiation, allowing both amber and black colored S. thoracica to have relatively similar temperatures.

=== UV radiation ===
Protection from UV radiation is also exploited by the dichotomous nature of the males. Black flies have a high amount of melanin, which they use to directly protect itself from UV damage. Amber flies invest in their cuticle, which becomes thicker with increased size. Thus, beyond a threshold, UV radiation will have little to no penetrance. This is an importance defense mechanism since UV radiation can lead to unwanted genetic mutations.
