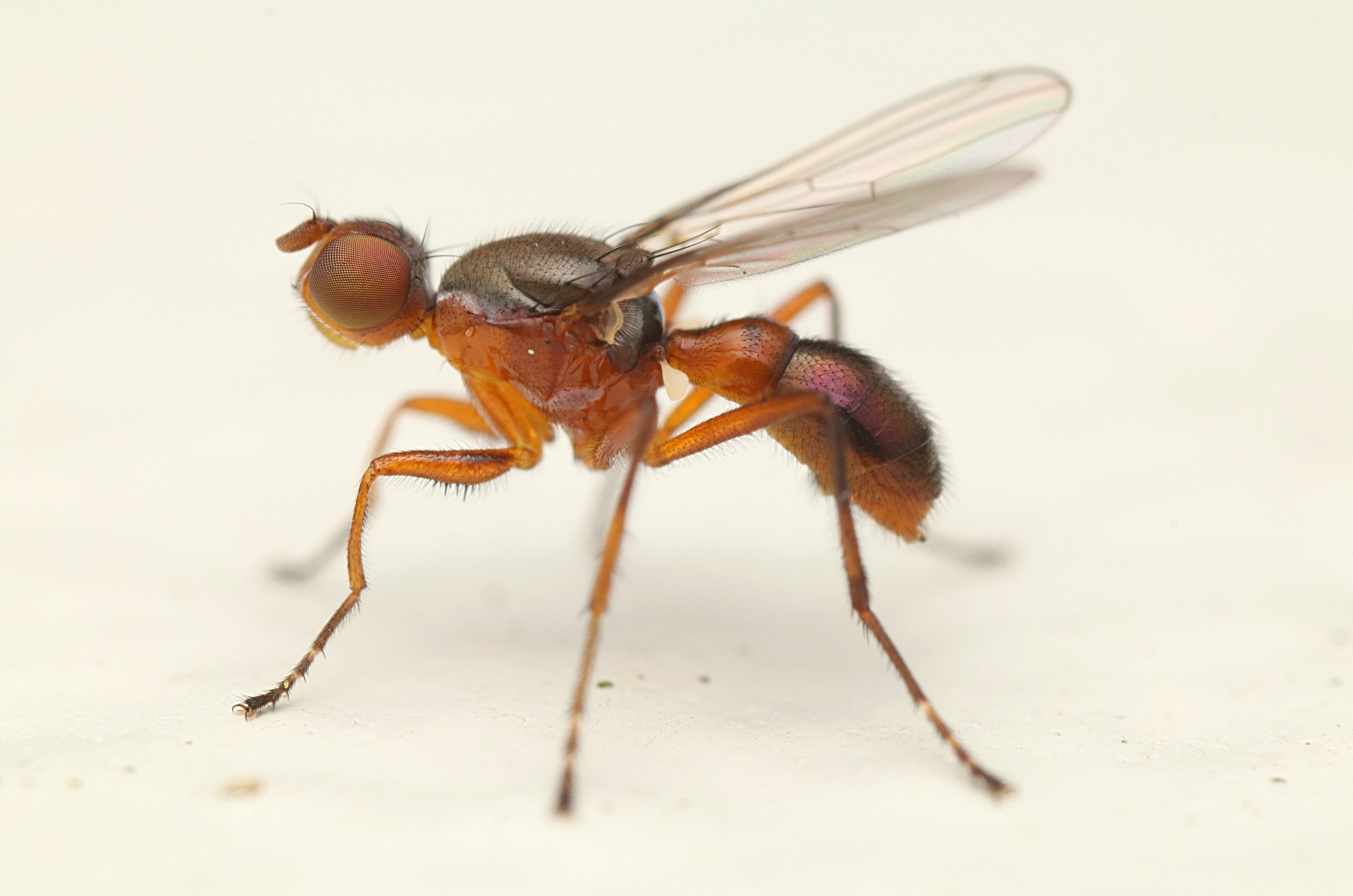

Scientific classification
- Kingdom: Animalia
- Phylum: Arthropoda
- Clade: Pancrustacea
- Class: Insecta
- Order: Diptera
- Family: Sepsidae
- Subfamily: Sepsinae
- Genus: Lasionemopoda; Duda, 1926
- Species: L. hirsuta

Binomial name
- Lasionemopoda hirsuta Meijere, 1906)

= Lasionemopoda =

Lasionemopoda hirsuta

Genus of flies

Lasionemopoda is a genus of flies in the family Sepsidae. It is monotypic, being represented by the single species Lasionemopoda hirsuta.
