= Afrosepsis =

Scientific classification
- Kingdom: Animalia
- Phylum: Arthropoda
- Clade: Pancrustacea
- Class: Insecta
- Order: Diptera
- Family: Sepsidae
- Subfamily: Sepsinae
- Genus: Afrosepsis; Ozerov, 1996

Type species
- Afrosepsis camerounica Ozerov, 1996

Genus of flies

Afrosepsis is a genus of flies in the family Sepsidae.

== Species ==
- A. camerounica Ozerov, 1996
- A. elongata Ozerov, 1999
- A. lineata Ozerov, 1999
- A. quadrimaculata Ozerov, 1999
- A. sublateralis (Vanschuytbroeck, 1962)
