= Protorygma =

Scientific classification
- Kingdom: Animalia
- Phylum: Arthropoda
- Clade: Pancrustacea
- Class: Insecta
- Order: Diptera
- Family: Sepsidae
- Subfamily: Orygmatinae
- Genus: †Protorygma; Hennig, 1965

Type species
- †Protorygma electricum Hennig, 1965

Genus of flies

Protorygma is an extinct genus of flies in the family Sepsidae.

== Species ==
- †Protorygma electricum Hennig, 1965
