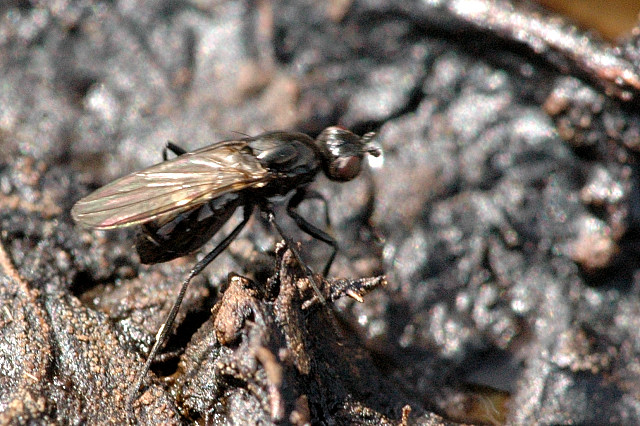

Scientific classification
- Kingdom: Animalia
- Phylum: Arthropoda
- Class: Insecta
- Order: Diptera
- Family: Sepsidae
- Subfamily: Sepsinae
- Genus: Themira
- Species: T. putris

Binomial name
- Themira putris (Linnaeus, 1758)

Synonyms
- Musca conssencis Harris, 1780; Musca putris Linnaeus, 1758; Themira conssencis (Harris, 1780); Themira pilosa Robineau-Desvoidy, 1830

= Themira putris =

Species of fly

Themira putris is a European species of fly and member of the family Sepsidae.
