= Lateosepsis =

Scientific classification
- Kingdom: Animalia
- Phylum: Arthropoda
- Clade: Pancrustacea
- Class: Insecta
- Order: Diptera
- Family: Sepsidae
- Subfamily: Sepsinae
- Genus: Lateosepsis; Ozerov, 2004

Type species
- Sepsis laticornis Duda, 1926

Genus of flies

Lateosepsis is a genus of flies in the family Sepsidae.

== Species ==
- Lateosepsis laticornis (Duda, 1926)
