= Idiosepsis =

Scientific classification
- Kingdom: Animalia
- Phylum: Arthropoda
- Clade: Pancrustacea
- Class: Insecta
- Order: Diptera
- Family: Sepsidae
- Subfamily: Sepsinae
- Genus: Idiosepsis; Ozerov, 1990

Type species
- Idiosepsis spangleri Ozerov, 1990

Genus of flies

Idiosepsis is a genus of flies in the family Sepsidae.

== Species ==
- Idiosepsis spangleri Ozerov, 1990
