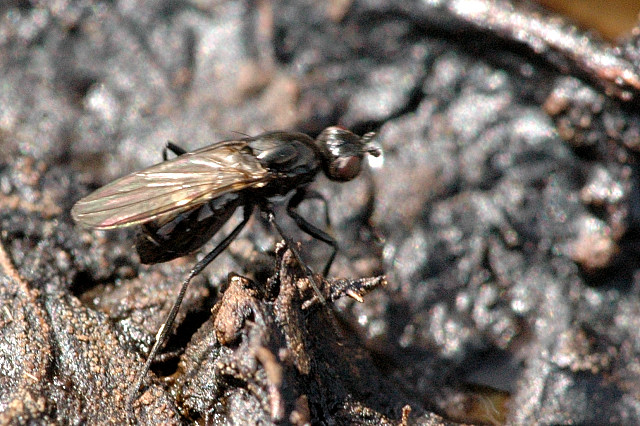
- Themira putris

Scientific classification
- Kingdom: Animalia
- Phylum: Arthropoda
- Clade: Pancrustacea
- Class: Insecta
- Order: Diptera
- Family: Sepsidae
- Subfamily: Sepsinae
- Genus: Themira; Robineau-Desvoidy, 1830

Synonyms
- Enicita Westwood, 1840; Enicomira Duda, 1926; Enicopus Walker, 1833; Annamira Ozerov, 1999; Cheligaster Macquart, 1835; Cheligastrula Strand, 1928; Henicita Agassiz, 1846; Henicopus Agassiz, 1846; Nadezhdamira Ozerov, 1999; Temira Melander & Spuler, 1917; Themoia Walker, 1849

= Themira =

Genus of flies

Themira is a genus of flies in the family Sepsidae.

== Species ==
- T. annulipes (Meigen, 1826)
- T. arctica Becker in Becker, 1915
- T. biloba Andersson, 1975
- T. germanica Duda, 1926
- T. gracilis (Zetterstedt, 1847)
- T. leachi (Meigen, 1826)
- T. lohmanus (Ang, 2017)
- T. lucida (Staeger in Schiødte, 1844)
- T. malformans Melander & Spuler, 1917
- T. minor (Haliday, 1833)
- T. nigricornis (Meigen, 1826)
- T. paludosa Elberg, 1963
- T. pusilla (Zetterstedt, 1847)
- T. putris (Linnaeus, 1758)
- T. ringdahli Pont, 2002
- T. sipmlicipes (Duda, 1926)
- T. superba (Haliday, 1833)

== See also ==
- List of sepsid fly species recorded in Europe
