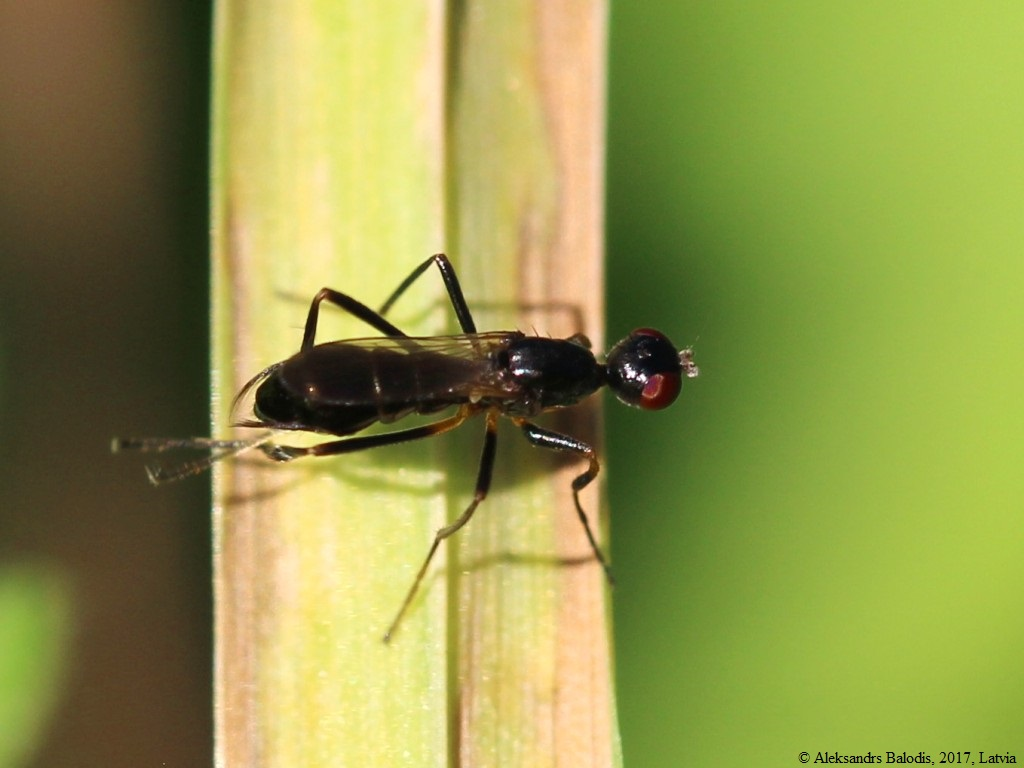

Scientific classification
- Kingdom: Animalia
- Phylum: Arthropoda
- Class: Insecta
- Order: Diptera
- Family: Sepsidae
- Subfamily: Sepsinae
- Genus: Themira
- Species: T. leachi

Binomial name
- Themira leachi (Meigen, 1826)

Synonyms
- Nemopoda fumipennis Walker, 1833; Nemopoda tarsalis Walker, 1833; Sepsis leachi Meigen, 1826; Themira fumipennis (Walker, 1833); Themira tarsalis (Walker, 1833)

= Themira leachi =

Species of fly

Themira leachi is a European species of fly and member of the family Sepsidae.
