= Dicranosepsis =

Scientific classification
- Kingdom: Animalia
- Phylum: Arthropoda
- Clade: Pancrustacea
- Class: Insecta
- Order: Diptera
- Family: Sepsidae
- Subfamily: Sepsinae
- Genus: Dicranosepsis; Duda, 1926

Type species
- Sepsis bicolor Wiedemann, 1830

Genus of flies

Dicranosepsis is a genus of flies in the family Sepsidae.

== Species ==
- Dicranosepsis barbata Iwasa, 2008
- Dicranosepsis bicolor (Wiedemann, 1830)
- Dicranosepsis biformis Iwasa, 2012
- Dicranosepsis breviappendiculata (Meijere, 1913)
- Dicranosepsis cavernosa Iwasa, 1999
- Dicranosepsis coryphea Steyskal, 1966
- Dicranosepsis crinita (Duda, 1926)
- Dicranosepsis distincta Iwasa & Tewari, 1991
- Dicranosepsis dudai Ozerov, 2003
- Dicranosepsis emiliae Ozerov, 1992
- Dicranosepsis hamata (Meijere, 1911)
- Dicranosepsis iwasai Ozerov, 1997
- Dicranosepsis javanica (Meijere, 1904)
- Dicranosepsis kaloedka Ozerov & Krivosheina, 2011
- Dicranosepsis kurahashii Iwasa, 2008
- Dicranosepsis longa Iwasa, 2008
- Dicranosepsis maculosa Iwasa, 1984
- Dicranosepsis mirabilis Iwasa, 1999
- Dicranosepsis monoseta Iwasa, 2008
- Dicranosepsis montana Iwasa, 1999
- Dicranosepsis nigrinodosa Iwasa, 1999
- Dicranosepsis notata Iwasa, 2012
- Dicranosepsis olfactoria Iwasa, 1984
- Dicranosepsis papuana Ozerov, 1997
- Dicranosepsis parva Iwasa, 1984
- Dicranosepsis planitarsis Ozerov, 1994
- Dicranosepsis prominula Iwasa, 1994
- Dicranosepsis pseudotibialis Ozerov, 2003
- Dicranosepsis renschi Ozerov, 2003
- Dicranosepsis revocans (Walker, 1860)
- Dicranosepsis robusta Iwasa, 2012
- Dicranosepsis sapaensis Ozerov & Krivosheina, 2011
- Dicranosepsis sauteri Ozerov, 2003
- Dicranosepsis sinuosa Iwasa, 2008
- Dicranosepsis splendifica Iwasa, 2012
- Dicranosepsis stabilis Iwasa, 1984
- Dicranosepsis takoensis (Vanschuytbroeck, 1963)
- Dicranosepsis thailandica Iwasa, 2012
- Dicranosepsis tibialis Iwasa & Tewari, 1991
- Dicranosepsis transita Ozerov, 1997
- Dicranosepsis trichordis Iwasa, 1994
- Dicranosepsis trochanteris Iwasa, 2012
- Dicranosepsis unipilosa (Duda, 1926)
- Dicranosepsis vietnamensis Iwasa, 2008
