= Leptomerosepsis =

Scientific classification
- Kingdom: Animalia
- Phylum: Arthropoda
- Clade: Pancrustacea
- Class: Insecta
- Order: Diptera
- Family: Sepsidae
- Subfamily: Sepsinae
- Genus: Leptomerosepsis; Duda, 1926

Type species
- Sepsis simplicicrus Duda, 1926

Genus of flies

Leptomerosepsis is a genus of flies in the family Sepsidae.

== Species ==
- Leptomerosepsis improvisa Ozerov, 1996
- Leptomerosepsis rubiginosa Ozerov, 1996
- Leptomerosepsis ruwenzoriensis (Vanschuytbroeck, 1963)
- Leptomerosepsis simplicicrus (Duda, 1926)
