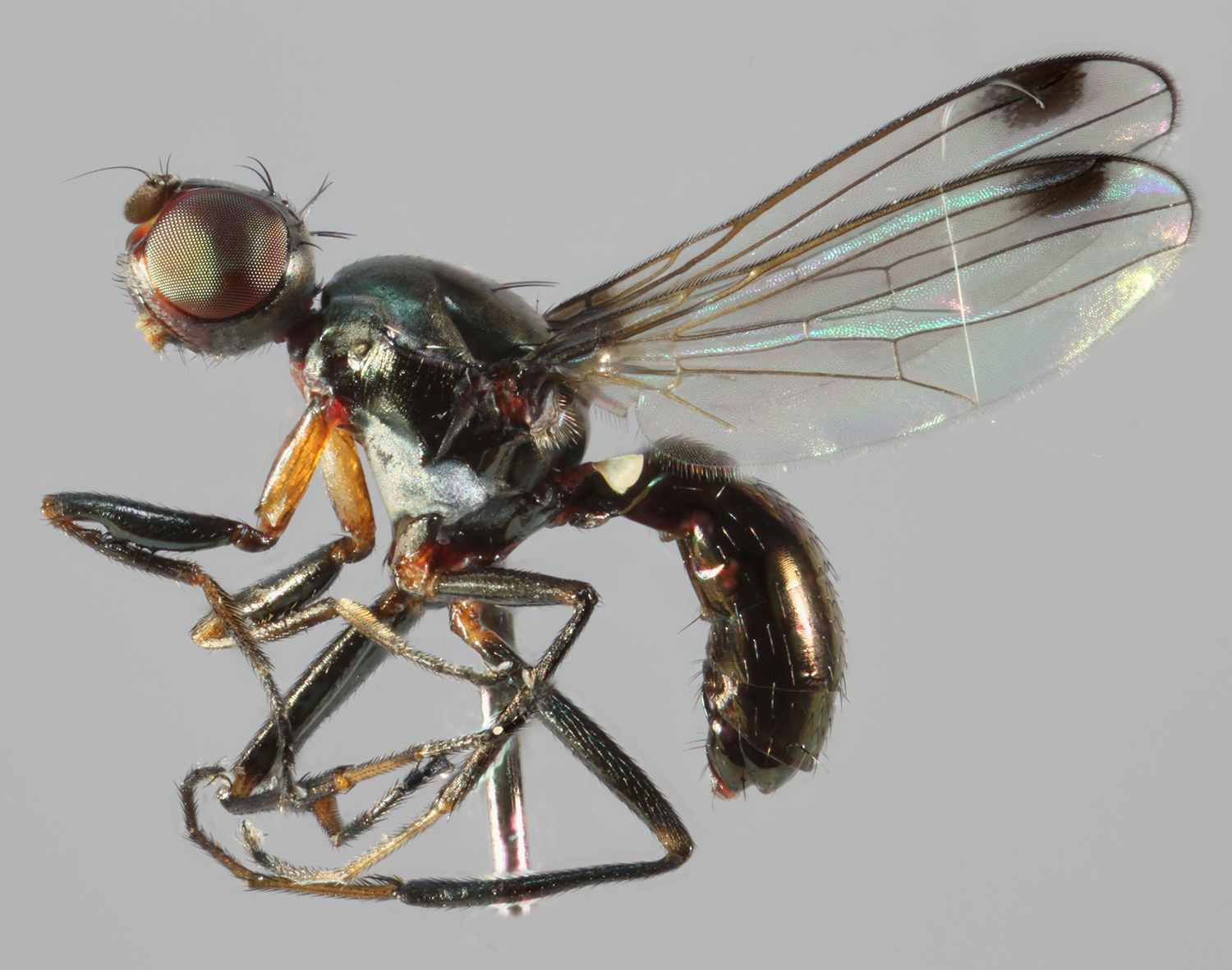

Scientific classification
- Kingdom: Animalia
- Phylum: Arthropoda
- Clade: Pancrustacea
- Class: Insecta
- Order: Diptera
- Family: Sepsidae
- Genus: Sepsis
- Species: S. cynipsea

Binomial name
- Sepsis cynipsea (Linnaeus, 1758)

Synonyms
- Musca cynipsea Linnaeus, 1758; Sepsis exigua Collin, 1946; Sepsis granaria (Curtis, 1846); Oscinis granaria Curtis, 1846

= Sepsis cynipsea =

Species of fly

Sepsis cynipsea is a European species of fly and member of the family Sepsidae. It is a coprophagous fly that feeds on dung. These flies are most commonly found around freshly laid cattle dung where they eat and reproduce. Due to human agricultural practices involving cows, these flies are now common in other areas of the world.

Sepsis cynipsea has been studied extensively due to its sexual selection and reproductive practices. They exhibit sexual conflict: males compete for females and mount females to guard them for reproductive purposes. The females have been observed attempting to shake the males off.

== Description ==
These dung flies are black in color, and approximately 4–5 mm (0.16–0.20 in) long. They have two translucent wings that contain one dark spot near the tip of each. They look like ants, and often are difficult to identify without a microscope due to their appearance.

== Distribution ==
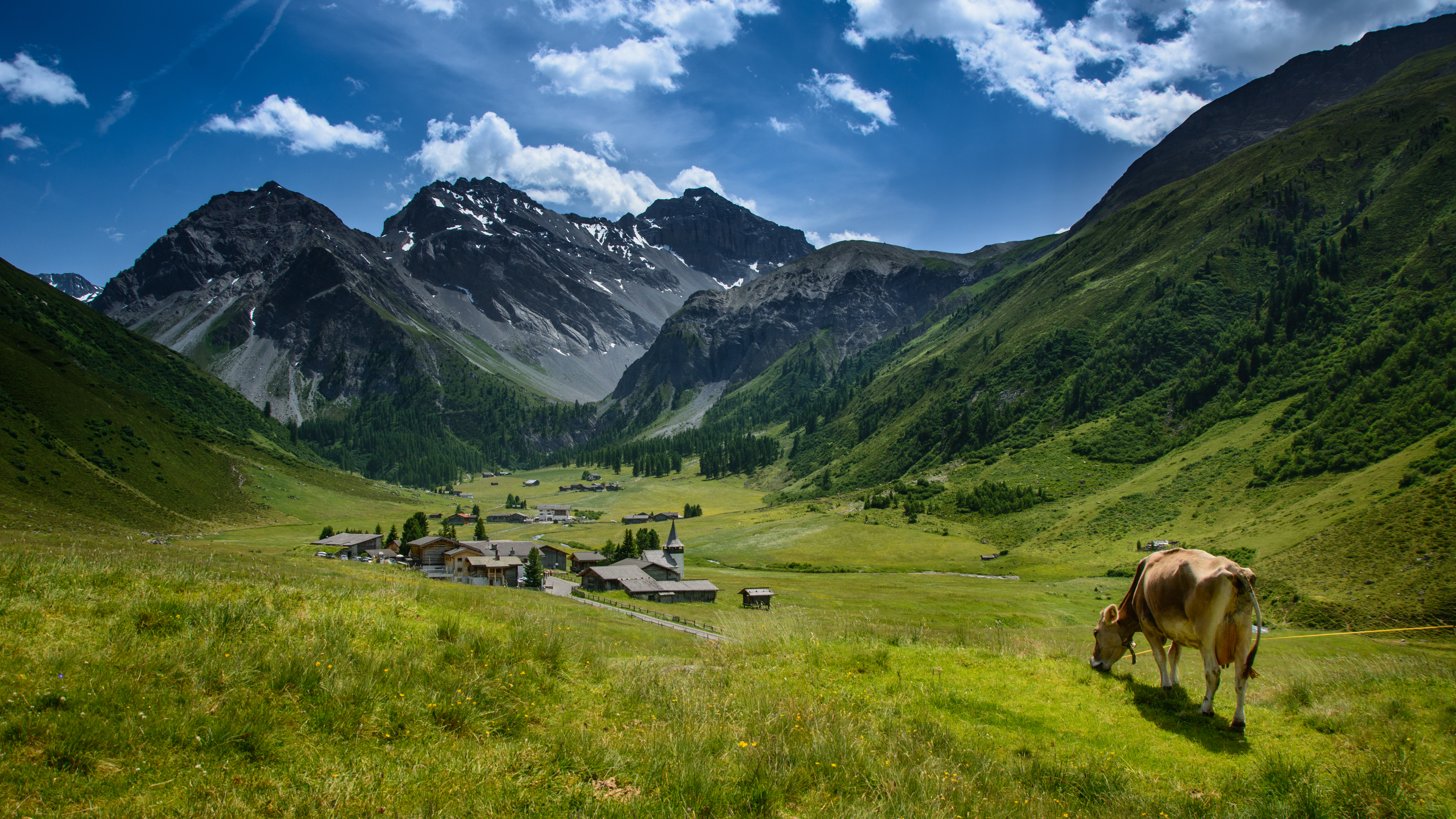
Landscape at the end of the valley around Sertig Dörfli, Davos, Switzerland, with massifs of Mittaghorn in the background: typical habitat of S. cynipsea

Sepsis cynipsea dung flies are most commonly found in Europe. They prefer warm temperatures and can be more easily found from May to October in lower altitudes, and June to September in higher altitudes where the temperature is typically cooler. In higher altitudes, female flies have shorter lifespans, are smaller, and lay fewer clutches of eggs. They require fresh dung, primarily from cows and sheep, for reproduction. They also eat nectar which is a source of sugar.

=== Altitude effects ===
Sepsis cynipsea dung flies are often found in regions with varying altitudes, such as the Swiss Alps. Out of the many different Sepsidae species that are found in these regions, Sepsis cynipsea flies prefer intermediate altitudes but are found at all altitudes where other species of dung flies are found. In the areas where these fly species are prevalent, there are more species diversity at higher altitudes. Higher altitude environments tend to be more variable, so species found at higher altitudes have to be better at adapting to environmental changes. However, S. cynpisea flies at different altitudes enter diapause at the same time and stop producing eggs at the same time in the season.

=== Temperature effects ===
The temperature during the larval phase of development impacts growth rates and final body size of Sepsis cynipsea. S. cynipsea grow the best at intermediate temperatures compared to similar species. However, in colder temperatures, S. cynipsea growth rates may increase so that they can reach adulthood before a cold season. Their growth rate also increases with warmer temperatures. At 30 °C (86 °F), it takes approximately 7 days for S. cynipsea flies to mature from eggs to adults. Resource availability, which can vary based on environmental conditions and competition with other species, also has an impact on the size of an adult body. S. cynipsea primarily uses temperature to determine when to enter diapause.

=== Competition ===
Because Sepsidae flies are often found in the same regions, there can be competition between species, like from S. neocynipsea which also prefers fresh cow dung for reproduction. However, some fly species, like S. duplicata prefer dry and old cow dung; this is known as niche differentiation.

== Mating ==
=== Reproduction ===
Sepsis cynipsea flies are most known for their mating practices that involve sexual conflict. Their mating habits have been extensively studied to better understand sexual selection, female choice, and reluctance in mating. Sepsis cynipsea flies require fresh dung to mate, and they prefer dung that is less than one hour old. Females land on the fresh dung, where large numbers of males are already waiting, and ingest fresh dung. The females lay their eggs on the dung, and while they are laying their eggs, a male gets on top of the female and guards her. Males are not selective for females; they tend to mount the first female they encounter on the dung. However, this is not copulation. The eggs she is laying are fertilized from a previous mate. After she lays her eggs on the fresh dung, she and the male move to the grass that surrounds the dung pile, where they have the opportunity to mate, although most pairs do not, as the female successfully shakes the male off. If they do make genital contact and mate, the next eggs she lays will probably be his. When the eggs hatch and the larvae emerge, the larvae eat the dung and then leave. S. cynipsea flies have evolved to develop quickly so they avoid competition with other coprophagous organisms and before the dung dries up.

=== Sexual conflict ===
Female Sepsis cynipsea flies are larger than the males, and because of this, a male cannot force a female to copulate with him. However, there is a lot of male competition. There are usually far more males than females on a dung pile, which leads to the ability for females to be selective. If a female does not want to mate with a male, she begins to shake her body, which either indicates to males that she does not want to mate or functions shake the male off of her body.

=== Mate choice ===
Larger males are more successful at mounting and mating with females, and larger females lay larger clutches of eggs. In populations with greater mean body sizes, sexual selection is stronger compared to populations with smaller body sizes. Once the male and female move into the grass after she lays her eggs, only about 40% of the pairs actually copulate. And when they do, there is evidence to suggest that females get physically injured in the process. The male reproductive organ is spiney, and females are left with scars and have a higher mortality after mating. This genital organ is most likely so armored to make it hard for the females to shake the males off; the male has to spin 180 degrees to get his genital organ out of the female. If a female does not shake the male off, they copulate. The flies then find another dung site 2–4 days later to repeat the process. This results in approximately six generations progressing during each breeding season.

== Evolution ==
=== Sexual dimorphisms ===
In the family Sepsidae, there is clear sexual dimorphism. The male foreleg, for example, differs greatly from a female foreleg, and differs in between Sepsidae species, as well. The Morphology (biology) of the male foreleg evolved to aid the male in mounting the female and staying on her during her characteristic body shaking. The male foreleg has evolved to have bristles, indentations, or bumps, which attach to the wing veins and cells on the female's wings. In response to this, the female can bend her abdomen to prevent genital contact with the male. In some Sepsidae species without adapted forelegs, the males have adapted an abdomen that bends to make contact with the female genitalia. These sexually dimorphic characteristics can be very different between closely related species, so sexually dimorphic characteristics evolve quickly and are involved in speciation in the family Sepsidae.

=== Taxonomy ===
The family Sepsidae contains more than 320 species and 37 genera, which are globally widespread. The sister species S. neocynipsea and S. cynipsea are found on different continents: S. neocynipsea in North America and S. cynipsea in Europe primarily. Sepsis has more species than other genera of the family Sepsidae. Sepsidae is monophyletic, with many different clades, including the Neotropical sepsids, the African clade, and the higher sepsids. The sexually dimorphic traits, such as the moveable abdomens, evolved independently multiple times.

=== Sister species ===
Sepsis neocynipsea is only recently diverged from Sepsis cynipsea. Even though both species are widespread, overlap geographically, and have similar mitochondrial gene sequences, they have different behaviors and morphologies. While S. neocynipsea is most commonly found in North America, it is also present in some of the same geographic locations that S. cynipsea is found in, like the Swiss Alps. While S. cynipsea and S. neocynipsea cross-breeding events can produce hybrid offspring, these offspring are typically infertile or have low fertility. Pre- and post-zygotic barriers between the species are still forming, so they have recently diverged. In S. cynipsea, female shaking during mating events is more visible than in S. neocynipsea. S. cynipsea flies also have higher rates of successful matings per mating attempts than S. neocynipsea do.

=== Genetics ===
There are high levels of genetic variability between flies, especially related to form. The heritability of these morphological traits ranges between 0.33 and 0.90 for males but is lower for females. Male Sepsis cynipsea flies are smaller than females for all traits except for the width of the fore femur. Body size and male leg features are selected for, so evolution works on these traits and contributes to sexual dimorphism.
