= Diploosmeteriosepsis =

Scientific classification
- Kingdom: Animalia
- Phylum: Arthropoda
- Clade: Pancrustacea
- Class: Insecta
- Order: Diptera
- Family: Sepsidae
- Subfamily: Sepsinae
- Genus: Diploosmeteriosepsis; Ozerov, 1996

Type species
- Dicranosepsis pilifemur Munari, 1994

Genus of flies

Diploosmeteriosepsis is a genus of flies in the family Sepsidae.

== Species ==
- Diploosmeteriosepsis pilifemur (Munari, 1994)
