= Perochaeta =

Scientific classification
- Kingdom: Animalia
- Phylum: Arthropoda
- Clade: Pancrustacea
- Class: Insecta
- Order: Diptera
- Family: Sepsidae
- Subfamily: Sepsinae
- Genus: Perochaeta; Duda, 1926

Type species
- Nemopoda orientalis Meijere, 1913

Genus of flies

Perochaeta is a genus of flies in the family Sepsidae.

== Species ==
- Perochaeta cuirassa Ang, 2010
- Perochaeta dikowi Ang, 2008
- Perochaeta exilis Iwasa, 2012
- Perochaeta hennigi Ozerov, 1992
- Perochaeta lobo Ang, 2010
- Perochaeta orientalis (Meijere, 1913)
