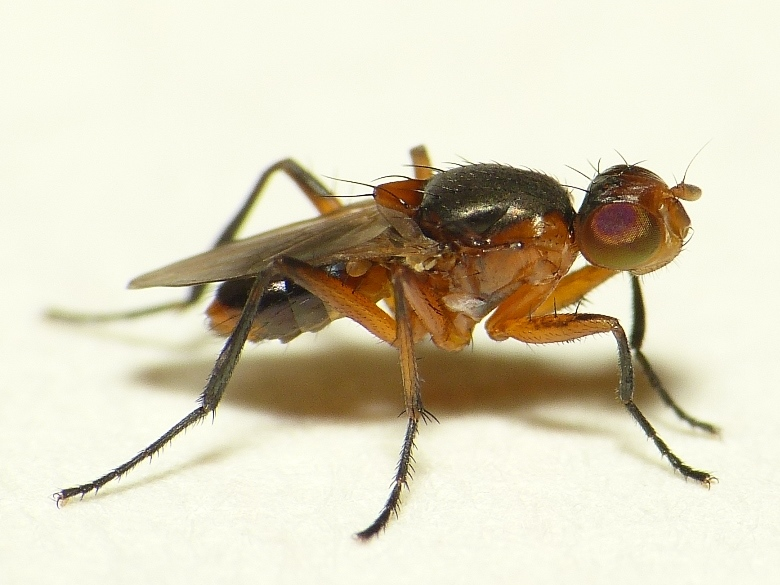
- Saltella sphondylii Netherlands

Scientific classification
- Kingdom: Animalia
- Phylum: Arthropoda
- Class: Insecta
- Order: Diptera
- Family: Sepsidae
- Subfamily: Sepsinae
- Genus: Saltella
- Species: S. sphondylii

Binomial name
- Saltella sphondylii (Schrank, 1803)

Synonyms
- Musca spondylii Schrank, 1803; Pandora basalis Haliday, 1833; Piophila scutellaris Fallén, 1820; Saltella basalis (Haliday, 1833); Saltella flavipes (Stephens, 29); Saltella scutellaris (Fallén, 1820); Saltella sellata Haliday, 1838; Sepsis flavipes Stephens, 1829; Trupanea sphondylii Schrank, 1803

= Saltella sphondylii =

Species of fly

Saltella sphondylii is a European species of flies and member of the family Sepsidae.
