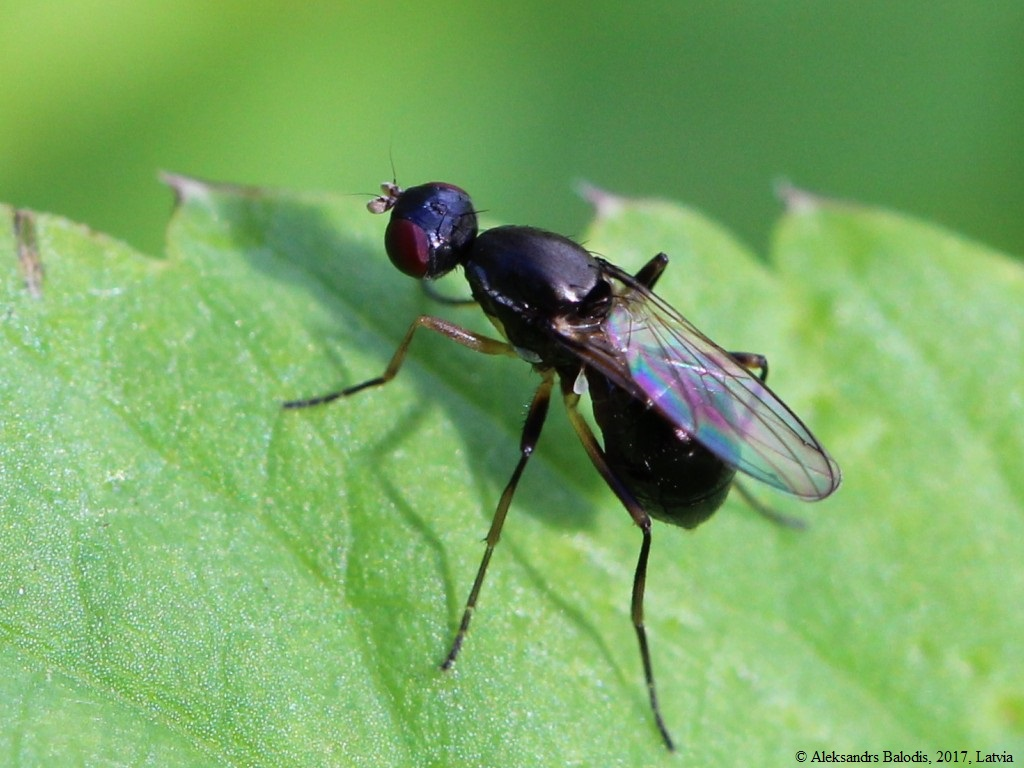
- Meroplius minutus 01.jpg

Scientific classification
- Kingdom: Animalia
- Phylum: Arthropoda
- Clade: Pancrustacea
- Class: Insecta
- Order: Diptera
- Family: Sepsidae
- Subfamily: Sepsinae
- Genus: Meroplius; Rondani, 1874

Type species
- Nemopoda stercoraria Robineau-Desvoidy, 1830

Synonyms
- Parameroplius Duda, 1926; Protomeroplius Ozerov, 1999

= Meroplius =

Genus of flies

Meroplius is a genus of flies in the family Sepsidae.

== Species ==
- Meroplius albuquerquei Silva, 1990
- Meroplius beckeri (Meijere, 1906)
- Meroplius bispinifer Ozerov, 1999
- Meroplius burundi Ozerov, 2018
- Meroplius cordylophorus Hennig, 1954
- Meroplius curvispinifer Ozerov, 2004
- Meroplius elephantis Iwasa, 1994
- Meroplius fasciculatus (Brunetti, 1909)
- Meroplius flavofemoratus Ozerov, 2000
- Meroplius hastifer Séguy, 1938
- Meroplius hastiferoides Ozerov, 1999
- Meroplius kirkspriggsi Ozerov, 2000
- Meroplius latispinifer Ozerov, 1999
- Meroplius madagascarensis Iwasa, 1996
- Meroplius maximus Iwasa, 1994
- Meroplius minutus (Wiedemann, 1830)
- Meroplius mirandus Iwasa, 1994
- Meroplius sauteri (Meijere, 1913)
- Meroplius trispinifer Ozerov, 1999
- Meroplius unispinifer Ozerov, 1999
- Meroplius vittata Ozerov, 1985
- Meroplius wallacei Iwasa, 1999
- Meroplius zimbabweensis Ozerov, 2018
