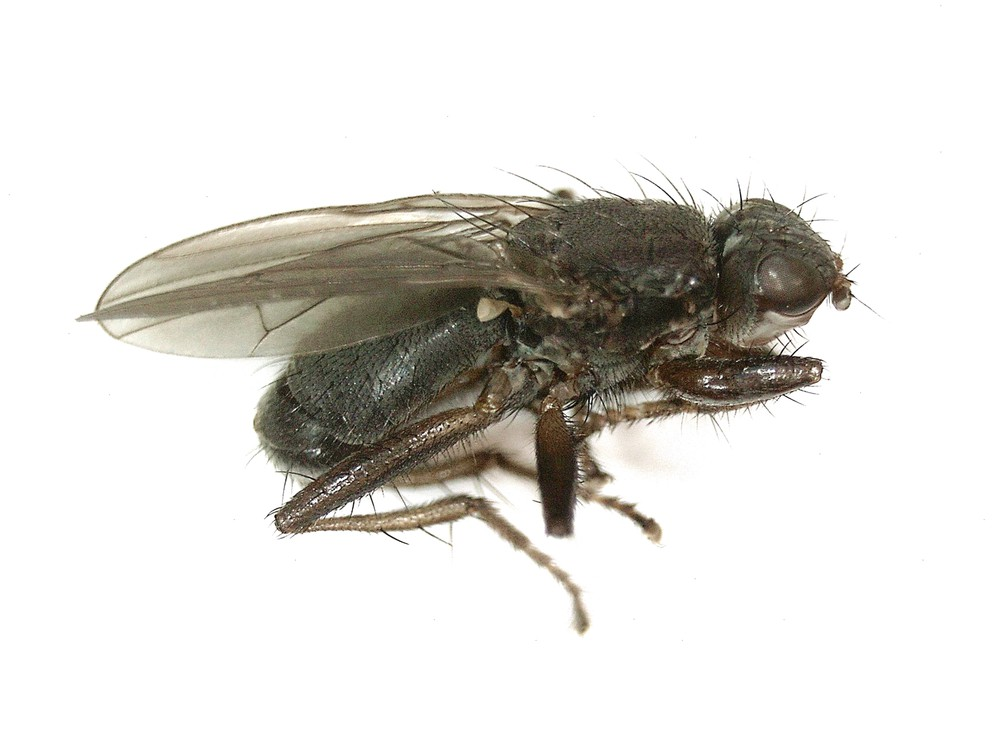

Scientific classification
- Kingdom: Animalia
- Phylum: Arthropoda
- Class: Insecta
- Order: Diptera
- Family: Sepsidae
- Subfamily: Orygmatinae
- Genus: Orygma; Meigen, 1830
- Species: O. luctuosum

Binomial name
- Orygma luctuosum Meigen, 1830

Synonyms
- Eugenacephala Johnson, 1922; Psalidomyia Doumerc, 1833

= Orygma =

Genus of flies

Orygma is a European genus of fly from the family Sepsidae. The only species is Orygma luctuosum. Larvae live mostly in the wrack zone.
