= Ortalischema =

Scientific classification
- Kingdom: Animalia
- Phylum: Arthropoda
- Clade: Pancrustacea
- Class: Insecta
- Order: Diptera
- Family: Sepsidae
- Subfamily: Sepsinae
- Genus: Ortalischema; Frey, 1925

Type species
- Sepsis albitarsis Zetterstedt, 1847

Synonyms
- Protothemira Duda, 1926

Genus of flies

Ortalischema is a genus of flies in the family Sepsidae.

== Species ==
- Ortalischema albitarse (Zetterstedt, 1847)
- Ortalischema maritimum Ozerov, 1985
