= Archisepsis =

Scientific classification
- Kingdom: Animalia
- Phylum: Arthropoda
- Clade: Pancrustacea
- Class: Insecta
- Order: Diptera
- Family: Sepsidae
- Subfamily: Sepsinae
- Genus: Archisepsis; Silva, 1993

Type species
- Sepsis armata Schiner, 1868

Synonyms
- Achisepsis Eberhard & Pereira, 1997; Phalacrosepsis Ozerov, 1994

Genus of flies

Archisepsis is a genus of flies in the family Sepsidae.

== Species ==
- Archisepsis armata (Schiner, 1868)
- Archisepsis bolivica Ozerov, 2004
- Archisepsis discolor (Bigot, 1857)
- Archisepsis diversiformis (Ozerov, 1993)
- Archisepsis ecalcarata (Thomson, 1869)
- Archisepsis hirsutissima Silva, 1993
- Archisepsis peruana (Ozerov, 1994)
- Archisepsis pleuralis (Coquillett, 1904)
- Archisepsis polychaeta (Ozerov, 1993)
- Archisepsis priapus Silva, 1993
- Archisepsis pusio (Schiner, 1868)
- Archisepsis umbrifer (Schiner, 1868)
