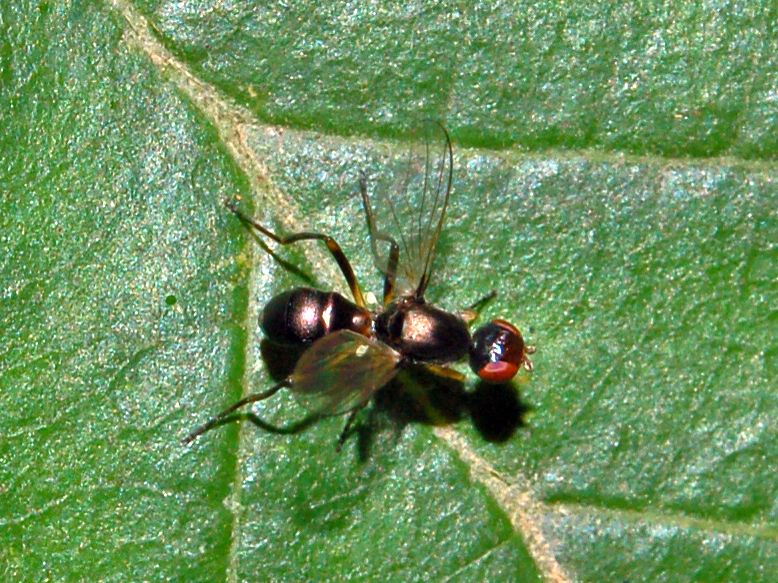
- Nemopoda sp.

Scientific classification
- Kingdom: Animalia
- Phylum: Arthropoda
- Class: Insecta
- Order: Diptera
- Family: Sepsidae
- Subfamily: Sepsinae
- Genus: Nemopoda; Robineau-Desvoidy, 1830

Synonyms
- Nematopoda Rye, 1873; Nematopoda Agassiz, 1846; Nomopoda Hendel, 1936

= Nemopoda =

Genus of flies

Nemopoda is a genus of flies belonging to the family Sepsidae.

== Species ==
- Nemopoda ealaensis Vanschuytbroeck, 1962
- Nemopoda induans Walker, 1861
- Nemopoda mamaevi Ozerov, 1997
- Nemopoda nitidula (Fallén, 1820)
- Nemopoda pectinulata Loew, 1873
