= Zuskamira =

Scientific classification
- Kingdom: Animalia
- Phylum: Arthropoda
- Clade: Pancrustacea
- Class: Insecta
- Order: Diptera
- Family: Sepsidae
- Subfamily: Sepsinae
- Genus: Zuskamira; Pont, 1987

Type species
- Zuskamira inexpectata Pont, 1987

Genus of flies

Zuskamira is a genus of flies in the family Sepsidae.

== Species ==
- Zuskamira inexpectata Pont, 1987
