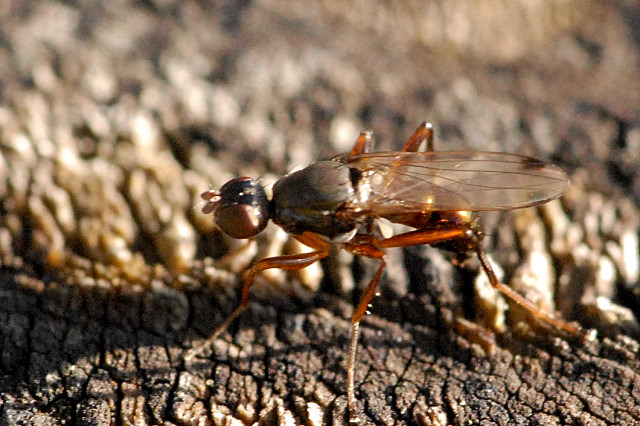

Scientific classification
- Kingdom: Animalia
- Phylum: Arthropoda
- Class: Insecta
- Order: Diptera
- Family: Sepsidae
- Genus: Sepsis
- Species: S. punctum

Binomial name
- Sepsis punctum (Fabricius, 1794)

Synonyms
- Musca punctum Fabricius, 1794; Sepsis ornata Meigen, 1826

= Sepsis punctum =

Species of fly

Sepsis punctum is a European species of fly and member of the family Sepsidae.
