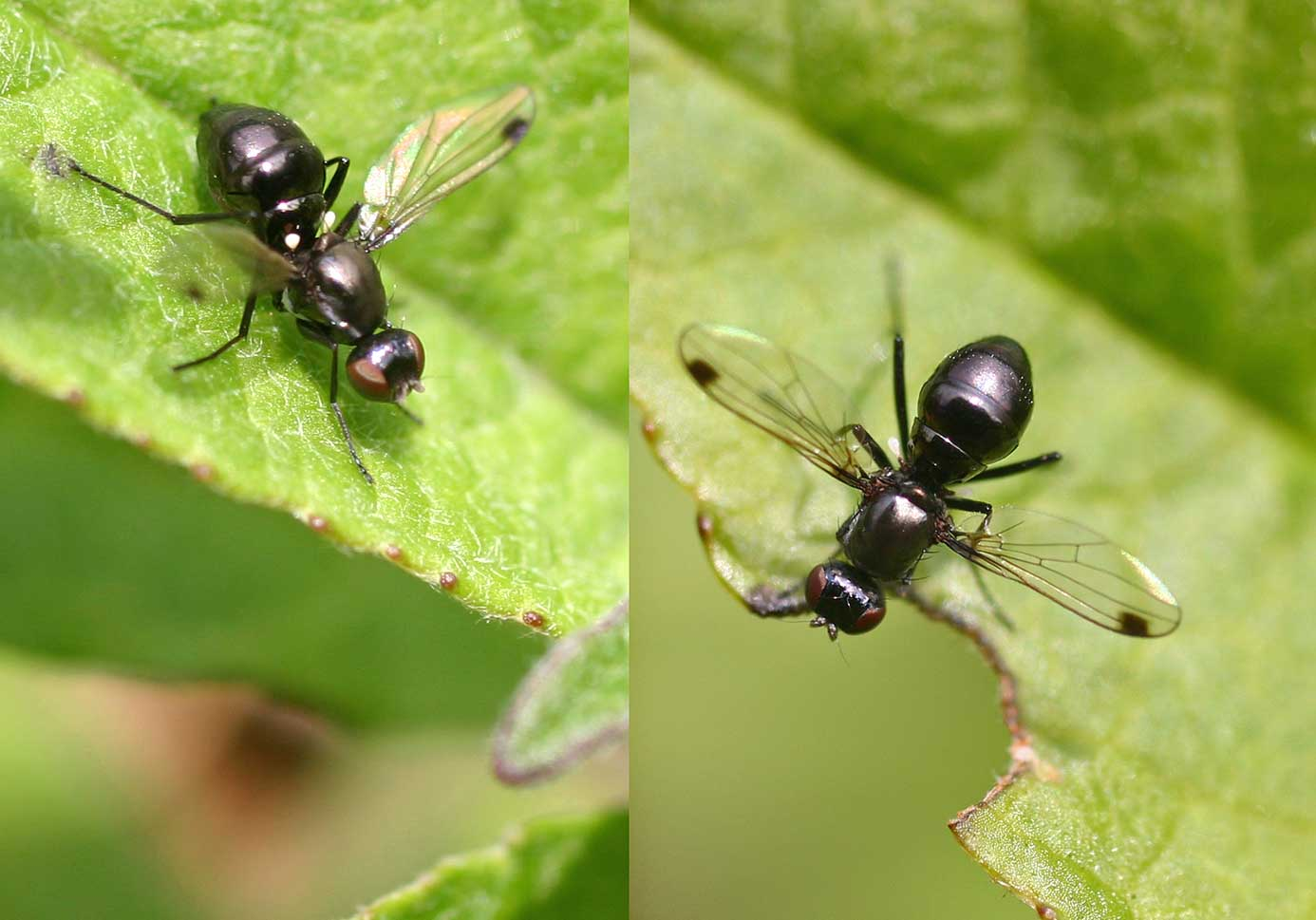

Scientific classification
- Kingdom: Animalia
- Phylum: Arthropoda
- Class: Insecta
- Order: Diptera
- Family: Sepsidae
- Subfamily: Sepsinae
- Genus: Sepsis
- Species: S. fulgens

Binomial name
- Sepsis fulgens Meigen, 1826

Synonyms
- Sepsis communis Frey, 1925; Sepsis concinna Walker, 1833; Sepsis tonsa Duda, 1926; Sepsis vibrans (Harris, 1780); Sepsis minimus (Harris, 1780)

= Sepsis fulgens =

Species of fly

Sepsis fulgens is a small ant-mimicking fly sometimes called the "lesser dung fly", though this can also refer to any member of the distantly related fly family Sphaeroceridae.

== Distribution ==
It is common in much of Europe, North Africa, Middle East and the Russian Far East. It tends to be less common at the northernmost areas of its range. In Northern Europe, it can be found from May to early October. In Southern Europe, it can be found year-round.

== Biology ==
This fly is often seen visiting flowers in order to obtain a carbohydrate meal. But it is most often associated with a variety of animal dung, particularly that of cow and horse, on which the female will lay her eggs, and the larva will feed. Male S. fulgens are often more common on dung, as it here that they will wait for the females. In fact, males are so keen, that they will very often mount any visiting fly that bears a slight resemblance to another Sepsis, including other males, but they will quickly dismount again when the error is apparent. When a suitable mate is found the male will stay firmly attached to the female, and copulation will normally take place later and at another location. So attached are the pair that it usually takes a 180-degree maneuver for the couple to part company.

S. fulgens are also known for their swarming behaviour, and these swarms have been estimated to sometimes reach 30,000 to 50,000. In places where these swarms takes place, there is often a distinctive odour.

== Parasites ==
There are a number of parasites that are associated with S. fulgens, particularly the mites Bonomoia sphaerocerae and Macrocheles insignitus, and possibly the nematode Diplogaster coprophila.
