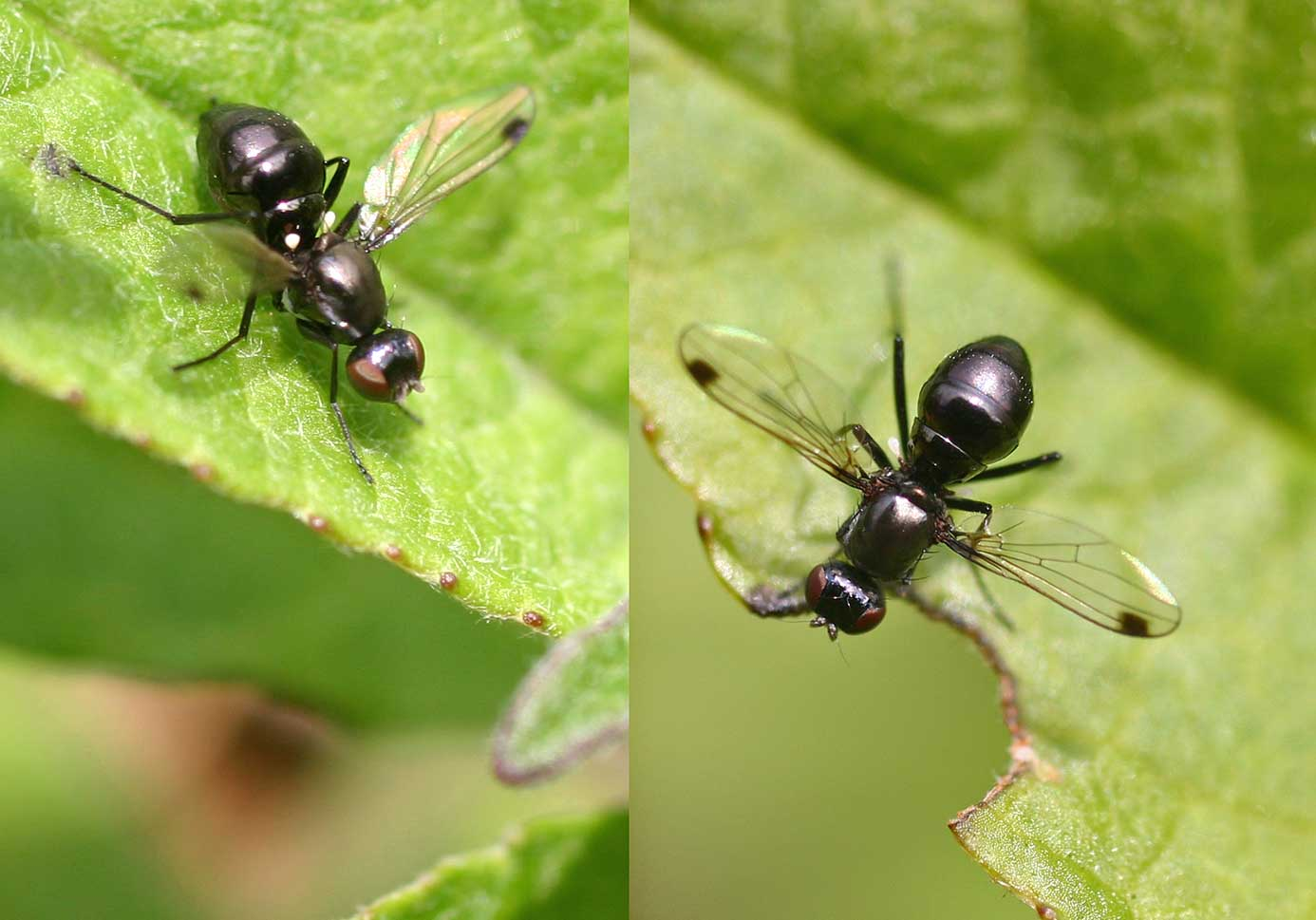
- Sepsis fulgens (lesser dung fly)

Scientific classification
- Kingdom: Animalia
- Phylum: Arthropoda
- Clade: Pancrustacea
- Class: Insecta
- Order: Diptera
- Section: Schizophora
- Subsection: Acalyptratae
- Superfamily: Sciomyzoidea
- Family: Sepsidae; Walker, 1833

Genera
- See text

= Sepsidae =

Family of flies

The Sepsidae are a family of flies, commonly called the black scavenger flies or ensign flies. Over 300 species are described worldwide. They are usually found around dung or decaying plant and animal material. Many species resemble ants, having a "waist" and glossy black body. Many Sepsidae have a curious wing-waving habit made more apparent by dark patches at the wing end.

Many species have a very wide distribution, reflecting the coprophagous habit of most Sepsidae. Some species have been spread over large territories in association with livestock. Adult flies are found mostly on mammal excrement, including that of humans (less often on other rotting organic matter), where eggs are laid and larvae develop, and on nearby vegetation, carrion, fermenting tree sap, and shrubs and herbs.

Many Sepsidae apparently play an important biological role as decomposers of mammal and other animal excrement. Some species may have a limited hygienic importance because of their association with human feces. Others are useful tools in forensic entomology.

== Description ==
Sepsis sp. on grass (video, 59 sec)

Sepsidae mating dance, 4x-slow-motion

Sepsidae mating dance, 2x-slow-motion

Sepsids are slender flies that resemble minute, winged ants. They are usually black in color, sometimes lustrous, and sometimes with silvery hairs on the thorax. The head is rounded. Sepsids have one or more bristles at the posteroventral margin of the posterior spiracle of the thorax, a character that distinguishes the family from other acalyptrates. The postvertical bristles are divergent or sometimes absent. Up to three pairs of frontal bristles are seen. They have ocelli with ocellar bristles. Vibrissae and palpi are poorly developed. The front legs of the male often have extrusions, spurs, teeth, or other ornamentation. The tibia has a dorsal preapical bristle in most genera. The abdomen is usually constricted in the basal part.

The larva is slender, tapering at the front end, and smooth except for ventral creeping welts. The larva is amphipneustic: it has two pairs of spiracles, one toward the head and one at the tail. The bulbous posterior end with its pair of spiracles distinguishes it from the larvae of other acalyptrates.

The pupa is enclosed within a puparium.

== Classification ==
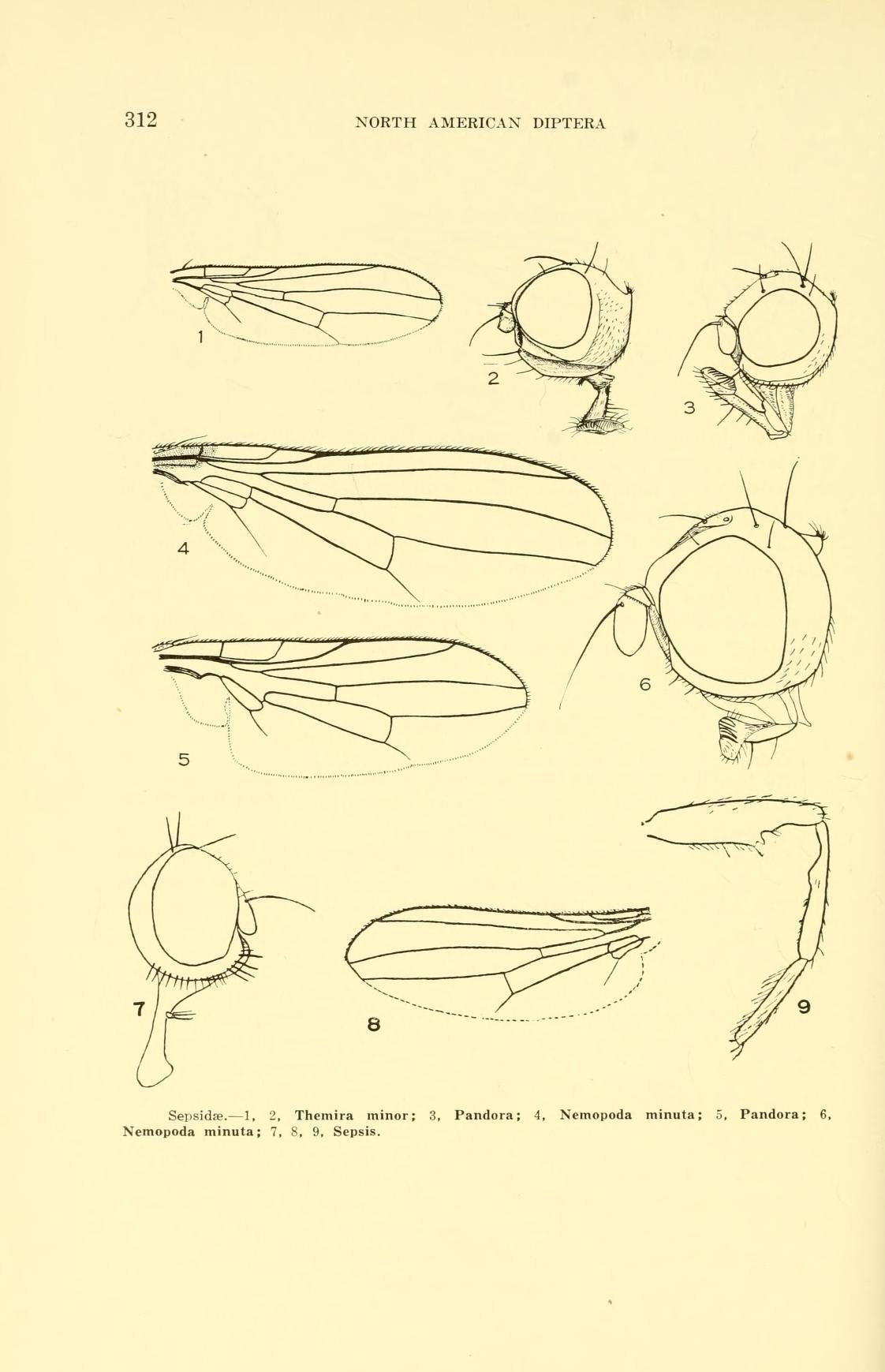
Sepsidae morphology

Genera include:

- Adriapontia Ozerov, 1996
- Afromeroplius Ozerov, 1996
- Afronemopoda Ozerov, 2004
- Afrosepsis Ozerov, 1996
- Archisepsis Silva, 1993
- Australosepsis Malloch, 1925
- Brachythoracosepsis Ozerov, 1996
- Decachaetophora Duda, 1926
- Diploosmeteriosepsis Ozerov, 1996
- Dicranosepsis Duda, 1926
- Dudamira Ozerov, 1996
- Idiosepsis Ozerov, 1990
- Lasionemopoda Duda, 1926
- Lasiosepsis Duda, 1926
- Lateosepsis Ozerov, 2004
- Leptomerosepsis Duda, 1926
- Meropliosepsis Duda, 1926
- Meroplius Rondani, 1874
- Microsepsis Silva, 1993
- Mucha Ozerov, 1992
- Nemopoda Robineau-Desvoidy, 1830
- Ortalischema Frey, 1925
- Orygma Meigen, 1830
- Palaeosepsioides Ozerov, 1992
- Palaeosepsis Duda, 1926
- Parapalaeosepsis Duda, 1926
- Paratoxopoda Duda, 1926
- Perochaeta Duda, 1926
- †Protorygma Hennig, 1965
- Pseudonemopoda Duda, 1926
- Pseudopalaeosepsis Ozerov, 1992
- Saltella Robineau-Desvoidy, 1830
- Sepsis Fallén, 1810
- Susanomira Pont, 1987
- Themira Robineau-Desvoidy, 1830
- Toxopoda Macquart, 1851
- Xenosepsis Malloch, 1925
- Zuskamira Pont, 1987

== See also ==
- List of sepsid fly species recorded in Europe
