= List of Bombylius species =

This is a list of 341 species in Bombylius, a genus of bee flies in the family Bombyliidae.

== Bombylius species ==
- Bombylius aaroni Baez, 1983^{c g}
- Bombylius abominalis Wiedemann, 1828^{c g}
- Bombylius acrophylax Greathead, 1991^{c g}
- Bombylius aestivus Johnson and Johnson, 1975^{i c g}
- Bombylius agilis Olivier, 1789^{c g}
- Bombylius aksarayensis Hasbenli & Zaitzev, 2000^{c g}
- Bombylius albaminis Seguy, 1949^{c g}
- Bombylius albicapillus Loew, 1872^{i c g b}
- Bombylius albopenicillatoides (Hall and Evenhuis, 1981)^{i c g}
- Bombylius albopenicillatus Bigot, 1892^{i c g}
- Bombylius albosparsus Bigot, 1892^{c g}
- Bombylius aleophilus (Hall and Evenhuis, 1981)^{i c g}
- Bombylius alexanderi Paramonov, 1940^{c g}
- Bombylius altaicus Paramonov, 1940^{c g}
- Bombylius altimyia Hall and Evenhuis, 1980^{i c g}
- Bombylius altivolans Francois, 1969^{c g}
- Bombylius ambustus Pallas & Wiedemann, 1818^{c g}
- Bombylius analis Olivier, 1789^{c g}
- Bombylius angulatus Macquart, 1826^{c g}
- Bombylius antennipilosus Paramonov, 1926^{c g}
- Bombylius anthophilus Evenhius, 1983^{i c g b}
- Bombylius anthophoroides Evenhuis, 1977^{i c g}
- Bombylius apertus (Macquart, 1847)^{c g}
- Bombylius apulus (Cyrillus, 1791)^{c g}
- Bombylius ardens Walker, 1849^{c g}
- Bombylius arenosus Paramonov, 1940^{c g}
- Bombylius argentarius Seguy, 1934^{c g}
- Bombylius argentifacies Austen, 1937^{c g}
- Bombylius arizonicus Hall, 1980^{i c g}
- Bombylius armeniacus Paramonov, 1925^{c g}
- Bombylius atriceps Loew, 1863^{i c g b}
- Bombylius atropos (Thunberg, 1789)^{c g}
- Bombylius audcenti Bowden, 1984^{c g}
- Bombylius aureocookae Evenhuis, 1984^{i c g}
- Bombylius aureus (Evenhuis, 1977)^{i c g}
- Bombylius aurifer Osten Sacken, 1877^{i c g b}
- Bombylius auriferoides Johnson and Johnson, 1975^{i c g}
- Bombylius austini Painter, 1933^{i c g}
- Bombylius axillaris Meigen, 1830^{c g}
- Bombylius aztec Evenhuis, 1984^{i c g}
- Bombylius balion Hall and Evenhuis, 1980^{i c g}
- Bombylius ballmeri Hall and Evenhuis, 1980^{i c g}
- Bombylius basifumatus Speiser, 1914^{c g}
- Bombylius bathi Evenhuis^{i}
- Bombylius bedouinus Efflatoun, 1945^{c g}
- Bombylius bellus (Philippi, 1865)^{c g}
- Bombylius bicolor (Loew, 1861)^{c g}
- Bombylius boharti Evenhuis, 1984^{i c g}
- Bombylius breviabdominalis Evenhuis, 1977^{i c g b}
- Bombylius brevirostris Olivier, 1789^{c g}
- Bombylius brunettii Senior-White, 1922^{c g}
- Bombylius cachinnans Osten Sacken, 1877^{i c g}
- Bombylius c-album Evenhuis, 1984^{i c g}
- Bombylius californicus Evenhuis and Tabet, 1981^{i c g}
- Bombylius callopterus Loew, 1855^{c g}
- Bombylius calus (Hall and Evenhuis, 1981)^{i c g}
- Bombylius canadensis Curran, 1933^{i c g}
- Bombylius candidifrons Austen, 1937^{c g}
- Bombylius candidus Loew, 1855^{c g}
- Bombylius canescens Mikan, 1796^{c g}
- Bombylius capensis Linnaeus, 1764^{c g}
- Bombylius chinensis Paramonov, 1931^{c g}
- Bombylius cinerarius Pallas & Wiedemann, 1818^{c g}
- Bombylius cinerascens Mikan, 1796^{c g}
- Bombylius cinereus Olivier, 1789^{c g}
- Bombylius cinerivus Painter, 1962^{i c g}
- Bombylius cirrhopus Evenhuis, 1978^{c g}
- Bombylius citrinus Loew, 1855^{c g}
- Bombylius clio Williston, 1901^{i c g}
- Bombylius coahuilensis (Hall and Evenhuis, 1981)^{i c g}
- Bombylius collaris Becker, 1906^{c g}
- Bombylius comanche Painter, 1962^{i c g b}
- Bombylius comastes Brunetti, 1909^{c g}
- Bombylius coquilletti Williston, 1899^{i c g b}
- Bombylius crassitarsis Paramonov, 1940^{c g}
- Bombylius cruciatus Fabricius, 1798^{c g}
- Bombylius curtirhynchus Evenhuis, 1978^{i c g b}
- Bombylius debilis Loew, 1855^{c g}
- Bombylius depictus Milne Edwards, 1828^{c g}
- Bombylius deserticola Paramonov, 1940^{c g}
- Bombylius desertivagus Paramonov, 1940^{c g}
- Bombylius diagonalis Wiedemann, 1820^{c g}
- Bombylius dichoptus Hall, 1976^{c g}
- Bombylius diegoensis Painter, 1933^{i c g b}
- Bombylius dimidiatus Macquart, 1840^{c g}
- Bombylius discolor Mikan, 1796^{c g}
- Bombylius dolorosus Williston, 1901^{c g}
- Bombylius dolorsus Williston, 1901^{i c g}
- Bombylius dorsalis Olivier, 1789^{c g}
- Bombylius duncani Painter, 1940^{i c g}
- Bombylius eboreus Painter, 1940^{i c g}
- Bombylius efflatounbeyi Evenhuis, 1978^{c g}
- Bombylius elbayensis Efflatoun, 1945^{c g}
- Bombylius elongatus Rossi, 1794^{c g}
- Bombylius eploceus Seguy, 1949^{c g}
- Bombylius erectus Brunetti, 1909^{c g}
- Bombylius erythrocerus Bezzi, 1901^{c g}
- Bombylius exiguus Walker, 1871^{c g}
- Bombylius facialis Cresson, 1919^{i c g}
- Bombylius fallax Austen, 1937^{c g}
- Bombylius favillaceus Meigen, 1820^{c g}
- Bombylius femoralis Bezzi, 1924^{c g}
- Bombylius fimbratus Meigen, 1820^{c g}
- Bombylius fimbriatus Meigen, 1820^{g}
- Bombylius fisheri Evenhuis, 1984^{i c g}
- Bombylius flavicalcaratus Lindner, 1979^{c g}
- Bombylius flavifacies Hall and Evenhuis, 1980^{i c g}
- Bombylius flavipes Wiedemann, 1828^{g}
- Bombylius flavipilosus Cole, 1923^{i c g}
- Bombylius flaviplosus Cole, 1923^{c g}
- Bombylius flavissimus Greathead, 1980^{c g}
- Bombylius floccosus Loew, 1857^{g}
- Bombylius forbesi Evenhuis, 1983^{c g}
- Bombylius fraudator Greathead, 1991^{c g}
- Bombylius fraudulentus Johnson, 1907^{i c g b}
- Bombylius frommerorum Hall and Evenhuis, 1980^{i c g}
- Bombylius fulvescens Wiedemann, 1820^{g}
- Bombylius fulvibasoides Painter, 1962^{i c g b}
- Bombylius fulvipes Villers, 1789^{c g}
- Bombylius fulvonotatus Wiedemann, 1818^{c g}
- Bombylius fulvulus Evenhuis & Greathead, 1999^{c g}
- Bombylius fulvus (Hall & Evenhuis, 1981)^{c g}
- Bombylius fumosus Dufour, 1852^{c g}
- Bombylius fuscus Fabricius, 1781^{c g}
- Bombylius gossyporrhus Evenhuis, 1984^{i c g}
- Bombylius goyaz (Macquart, 1840)^{c g}
- Bombylius gracilipes Becker, 1906^{c g}
- Bombylius grandiosus Evenhuis, 1984^{i c g}
- Bombylius haemorrhoicum (Loew, 1863)^{c g}
- Bombylius haemorrhoidalis Bezzi, 1921^{c g}
- Bombylius halli Evenhuis and Tabet, 1981^{i c g}
- Bombylius haywardi Edwards, 1937^{c g}
- Bombylius helvus Wiedemann, 1821^{i c g b}
- Bombylius hesychastes (Hall and Evenhuis, 1981)^{i c g}
- Bombylius heximaculatus Loew, 1872^{b}
- Bombylius hololeucus Loew, 1873^{c g}
- Bombylius horni Paramonov, 1931^{c g}
- Bombylius hypoxantha Loew, 1863^{c g}
- Bombylius incanus Johnson, 1907^{i c g b}
- Bombylius incognitus Evenhuis & Greathead, 1999^{c g}
- Bombylius inconspicus Greathead, 1967^{c g}
- Bombylius insularis (Bigot, 1857)^{c g}
- Bombylius io Williston, 1901^{i c g}
- Bombylius iphiculus (Hall & Evenhuis, 1981)^{i c g b}
- Bombylius iranicus Paramonov, 1940^{c g}
- Bombylius japygus Hall and Evenhuis, 1980^{i c g}
- Bombylius kanabensis Johnson and Johnson, 1975^{i c g}
- Bombylius kirgizorum Zaitzev, 1989^{c g}
- Bombylius koreanus Paramonov, 1926^{c g}
- Bombylius kozlovi Paramonov, 1926^{c g}
- Bombylius kugleri Zaitzev, 1995^{c g}
- Bombylius kutshurganicus Paramonov, 1926^{c g}
- Bombylius lancifer Osten Sacken, 1877^{i c g b}
- Bombylius landbecki Philippi, 1865^{c g}
- Bombylius lassenensis Painter, 1965^{i c g}
- Bombylius leberi Evenhuis, 1984^{i c g}
- Bombylius lejostomus Loew, 1855^{c g}
- Bombylius leucopygus Macquart, 1846^{c g}
- Bombylius loriae (Evenhuis, 1977)^{c g}
- Bombylius lusitanicus Meigen, 1830^{c g}
- Bombylius luteolus Evenhuis, 1978^{c g}
- Bombylius macfarlandi Evenhuis, 1985^{i c g}
- Bombylius maculatus Fabricius, 1775^{c g}
- Bombylius maculithorax Paramonov, 1926^{c g}
- Bombylius maculosus (Painter, 1926)^{i c g}
- Bombylius magnificus Evenhuis, 1980^{c g}
- Bombylius major Linnaeus, 1758^{i c g b} (greater bee fly)
- Bombylius marebensis Greathead, 1967^{c g}
- Bombylius marginatus (Cyrillus, 1792)^{c g}
- Bombylius marilynae Evenhuis, 1984^{i c g}
- Bombylius massaurensis Greathead, 1967^{c g}
- Bombylius mauritanus Olivier, 1789^{c g}
- Bombylius maurus Olivier, 1789^{c g}
- Bombylius medius Linnæus, 1758^{c g}
- Bombylius medorae Painter, 1940^{i c g}
- Bombylius meigeni Evenhuis & Greathead, 1999^{c g}
- Bombylius melanopygus Bigot, 1861^{c g}
- Bombylius mendax Austen, 1937^{c g}
- Bombylius metopium Osten Sacken, 1877^{i c g}
- Bombylius mexicanus Wiedemann, 1821^{i c g b}
- Bombylius micropsarus Evenhuis, 1980^{c g}
- Bombylius minor Linnæus, 1758^{c g}
- Bombylius mobilis Loew, 1873^{c g}
- Bombylius moctezuma Hall and Evenhuis^{i}
- Bombylius modestoides Bowden, 1975^{c g}
- Bombylius modestus Loew, 1873^{c g}
- Bombylius mohavensis Evenhuis, 1975^{i c g b}
- Bombylius montanus Johnson and Johnson, 1975^{i c g}
- Bombylius montium Francois, 1955^{c g}
- Bombylius morelos Evenhuis & Greathead, 1999^{c g}
- Bombylius morio Olivier, 1789^{c g}
- Bombylius morosus Meijere, 1913^{c g}
- Bombylius moussayensis Efflatoun, 1945^{c g}
- Bombylius mus Bigot, 1862^{c g}
- Bombylius narynensis Zaitzev, 1989^{c g}
- Bombylius navajo (Hall and Evenhius)^{i g}
- Bombylius neithokris Jaennicke, 1867^{c g}
- Bombylius neopallidus Hall and Evenhuis^{i}
- Bombylius neopulcher Hall and Evenhuis^{i}
- Bombylius neotropicus Evenhuis, 1984^{c g}
- Bombylius nephthys (Hall and Evenhuis, 1980)^{i c g}
- Bombylius nevadensis Hall and Evenhuis, 1980^{i c g}
- Bombylius nicholsonae Hall and Evenhuis, 1980^{i c g}
- Bombylius nigricolor Francois, 1969^{c g}
- Bombylius nigripes Macquart, 1834^{c g}
- Bombylius nigriventris Johnson and Johnson, 1975^{i c g}
- Bombylius nigrofemoratus Painter^{i c g}
- Bombylius niveus Meigen, 1804^{c g}
- Bombylius nubilus Mikan, 1796^{c g}
- Bombylius nudus Villers, 1789^{c g}
- Bombylius numidus Macquart, 1846^{c g}
- Bombylius obliquus Brullé, 1833^{c g}
- Bombylius obscuripennis Paramonov, 1929^{c g}
- Bombylius oceanus Becker, 1908^{c g}
- Bombylius ochraceus Bigot, 1892^{c g}
- Bombylius olgae Zaitzev, 1995^{c g}
- Bombylius olivierii Macquart, 1840^{c g}
- Bombylius olsufjevi Paramonov, 1940^{c g}
- Bombylius orientalis Macquart, 1840^{c g}
- Bombylius ovatus Hall, 1976^{c g}
- Bombylius painteri Evenhuis, 1978^{i c g}
- Bombylius painterorum (Hall and Evenhuis, 1981)^{i c g}
- Bombylius pallens Wiedemann, 1820^{c g}
- Bombylius pallidicruris Brullé, 1833^{c g}
- Bombylius pallidipilus Greathead, 1967^{c g}
- Bombylius pallidus Abbassian-Lintzen, 1965^{c g}
- Bombylius pamiricus Zaitzev, 1989^{c g}
- Bombylius paradoxus (Hall and Evenhuis, 1981)^{i c g}
- Bombylius pardalotus Francois, 1969^{c g}
- Bombylius pauli Zaitzev, 2003^{c g}
- Bombylius pendens Cole and Lovett, 1919^{i c g}
- Bombylius pericaustus Loew, 1873^{c g}
- Bombylius persicus Paramonov, 1926^{c g}
- Bombylius phaeopterus Bezzi, 1924^{c g}
- Bombylius phlogmodes Evenhuis, 1984^{i c g}
- Bombylius pintuarius Baez, 1983^{c g}
- Bombylius plichtai Hall and Evenhuis, 1980^{i c g}
- Bombylius plumipes Drury, 1773^{c g}
- Bombylius podagricus Paramonov, 1940^{c g}
- Bombylius polius Zaitzev, 2004^{c g}
- Bombylius polypogon Loew, 1855^{c g}
- Bombylius posticus Fabricius, 1805^{c g}
- Bombylius postversicolor Evenhuis & Greathead, 1999^{c g}
- Bombylius primogenitus Walker, 1849^{c g}
- Bombylius probellus Hardy, 1942^{c g}
- Bombylius propinquus Brunetti, 1909^{c g}
- Bombylius proximocruciatus Abbassian-Lintzen, 1965^{c g}
- Bombylius pulchellus Loew, 1863^{i c g b}
- Bombylius pulcher (Painter, 1926)^{i c g}
- Bombylius pulcherrimus Evenhuis & Greathead, 1999^{c g}
- Bombylius pumilus Meigen, 1820^{c g}
- Bombylius punctipennis Loew, 1855^{c g}
- Bombylius pusiellus Evenhuis & Greathead, 1999^{c g}
- Bombylius pygmaeus Fabricius, 1781^{i c g b}
- Bombylius pyrrhothrix (Hall and Evenhuis, 1981)^{i c g}
- Bombylius quadricolor Evenhuis, 1984^{i c g}
- Bombylius quadrifarius Loew, 1855^{c g}
- Bombylius queretaroensis Evenhuis & Greathead, 1999^{c g}
- Bombylius quirinus Evenhuis, 1984^{i c g}
- Bombylius ravus Loew, 1863^{i c g}
- Bombylius recedens Walker, 1852^{c g}
- Bombylius reginae Evenhuis, 1984^{c g}
- Bombylius repeteki Paramonov, 1940^{c g}
- Bombylius rhea Evenhuis, 1984^{i c g}
- Bombylius rhodius Loew, 1855^{c g}
- Bombylius roonwali Zaitzev, 1988^{c g}
- Bombylius rossicus Evenhuis & Greathead, 1999^{c g}
- Bombylius rufiventris Macquart, 1846^{c g}
- Bombylius rufum Olivier, 1789^{c g}
- Bombylius ruizi Edwards, 1937^{c g}
- Bombylius ruoanalis Macqaurt, 1850^{c g}
- Bombylius rutilous (Hall. 1975)^{i c g}
- Bombylius rutilus (Hall, 1975)^{i g}
- Bombylius saudiensis Greathead, 1980^{c g}
- Bombylius schaeuffelei Lindner, 1979^{c g}
- Bombylius semifuscus Meigen, 1820^{c g}
- Bombylius seminiger Becker, 1906^{c g}
- Bombylius semirufus (Loew, 1872)^{c g}
- Bombylius senilis (Fabricius, 1794)^{c g}
- Bombylius septentrionalis (Hall and Evenhuis, 1981)^{i c g}
- Bombylius shah Paramonov, 1940^{c g}
- Bombylius shelkovnikovi Paramonov, 1926^{c g}
- Bombylius shibakawae Matsumura, 1916^{c g}
- Bombylius sierra Evenhuis & Greathead, 1999^{c g}
- Bombylius silvus Cole and Lovett, 1919^{i c g}
- Bombylius similis (Modeer, 1786)^{c g}
- Bombylius simplicipennis Bezzi, 1924^{c g}
- Bombylius simulans Austen, 1937^{c g}
- Bombylius socotrae Greathead, 1969^{c g}
- Bombylius spinipes Thomson, 1869^{c g}
- Bombylius spinulosus Hasbenli & Zaitzev, 2000^{c g}
- Bombylius striatifrons Becker, 1906^{c g}
- Bombylius subacutus Hesse, 1938^{c g}
- Bombylius subflavus (Painter, 1926)^{i c g}
- Bombylius submaculosus (Hall and Evenhuis, 1981)^{i c g}
- Bombylius succandidus Roberts, 1928^{c g}
- Bombylius suffusa Walker, 1849^{c g}
- Bombylius susianae Abbassian-Lintzen, 1965^{c g}
- Bombylius sylphae Evenhuis, 1984^{i c g}
- Bombylius syndesmus (Coquillett, 1894)^{i c}
- Bombylius syrinx Evenhuis, 1980^{c g}
- Bombylius sytshuanensis Paramonov, 1926^{c g}
- Bombylius taxcoensis Hall & Evenhuis, 1981^{c g}
- Bombylius taxconesis (Hall and Evenhuis, 1981)^{i c g}
- Bombylius tephroleucus Loew, 1855^{c g}
- Bombylius terminalis Brunetti, 1909^{c g}
- Bombylius testaceiventris Paramonov, 1925^{c g}
- Bombylius texanus Painter, 1933^{i c g b}
- Bombylius thapsinoides Evenhuis, 1978^{c g}
- Bombylius torquatus Loew, 1855^{c g}
- Bombylius trichurus Pallas, 1818^{c g}
- Bombylius tripudians Bezzi, 1924^{c g}
- Bombylius tuckeri Hesse, 1938^{c g}
- Bombylius turanicus Paramonov, 1926^{c g}
- Bombylius turcmenicus Paramonov, 1926^{c g}
- Bombylius uniformis Paramonov, 1955^{c g}
- Bombylius ushinskii Paramonov, 1940^{c g}
- Bombylius uzbekorum Paramonov, 1926^{c g}
- Bombylius vagabundus Meigen, 1830^{c g}
- Bombylius vagans Meigen, 1830^{c g}
- Bombylius valdivianus Rondani, 1863^{c g}
- Bombylius validus Loew, 1863^{i c g b}
- Bombylius vallicola Evenhuis and Tabet, 1981^{i c g}
- Bombylius vansoni Hesse, 1936^{c g}
- Bombylius varius Fabricius, 1805^{i c g b}
- Bombylius venosus Mikan, 1796^{c g}
- Bombylius vittatus (Painter, 1926)^{i c g}
- Bombylius vlasovi Paramonov, 1940^{c g}
- Bombylius wadensis Efflatoun, 1945^{c g}
- Bombylius walkeri Evenhuis, 1978^{c g}
- Bombylius washingtoniensis Evenhuis, 1978^{i c g}
- Bombylius watanabei Matsumura, 1916^{c g}
- Bombylius waterbergensis Hesse, 1938^{c g}
- Bombylius willistoni Evenhuis, 1984^{i c g}
- Bombylius xanthinus Evenhuis & Greathead, 1999^{c g}
- Bombylius xanthothrix Evenhuis, 1978^{i c g}
- Bombylius zapataensis Evenhuis, 1984^{i c g}
- Bombylius zarudnyi Paramonov, 1940^{c g}
- Bombylius zephyr Evenhuis & Greathead, 1999^{c g}
- Bombylius zircon Evenhuis, 1984^{i c g}
- Bombylius zonicus Evenhuis & Greathead, 1999^{c g}

Data sources: i = ITIS, c = Catalogue of Life, g = GBIF, b = Bugguide.net
