= Bombylius coquilletti =

Scientific classification
- Domain: Eukaryota
- Kingdom: Animalia
- Phylum: Arthropoda
- Class: Insecta
- Order: Diptera
- Family: Bombyliidae
- Tribe: Bombyliini
- Genus: Bombylius
- Species: B. coquilletti

Binomial name
- Bombylius coquilletti Williston, 1899

Synonyms
- Thlipsogaster ater Coquillett, 1894

Species of fly

Bombylius coquilletti is a species of bee flies in the family Bombyliidae.
