= Bombylius iphiculus =

Scientific classification
- Domain: Eukaryota
- Kingdom: Animalia
- Phylum: Arthropoda
- Class: Insecta
- Order: Diptera
- Family: Bombyliidae
- Tribe: Bombyliini
- Genus: Bombylius
- Species: B. iphiculus

Binomial name
- Bombylius iphiculus (Hall & Evenhuis, 1981)

Synonyms
- Parabombylius iphiculus Hall and Evenhuis, 1981

Species of fly

Bombylius iphiculus is a species of bee flies in the family Bombyliidae.
