= Bombylius pulchellus =

Scientific classification
- Kingdom: Animalia
- Phylum: Arthropoda
- Class: Insecta
- Order: Diptera
- Family: Bombyliidae
- Tribe: Bombyliini
- Genus: Bombylius
- Species: B. pulchellus

Binomial name
- Bombylius pulchellus Loew, 1863

Synonyms
- Bombylius fascipennis Evenhuis, 1978

Species of fly

Bombylius pulchellus is a species of bee flies in the family Bombyliidae. It is found in Canada from Alberta east to Quebec and in the northern United States from Nebraska to Maryland. The larvae are parasitoids of Halictus ligatus larvae and pupae, although B. pulchellus pupates in soil away from the host nest.
