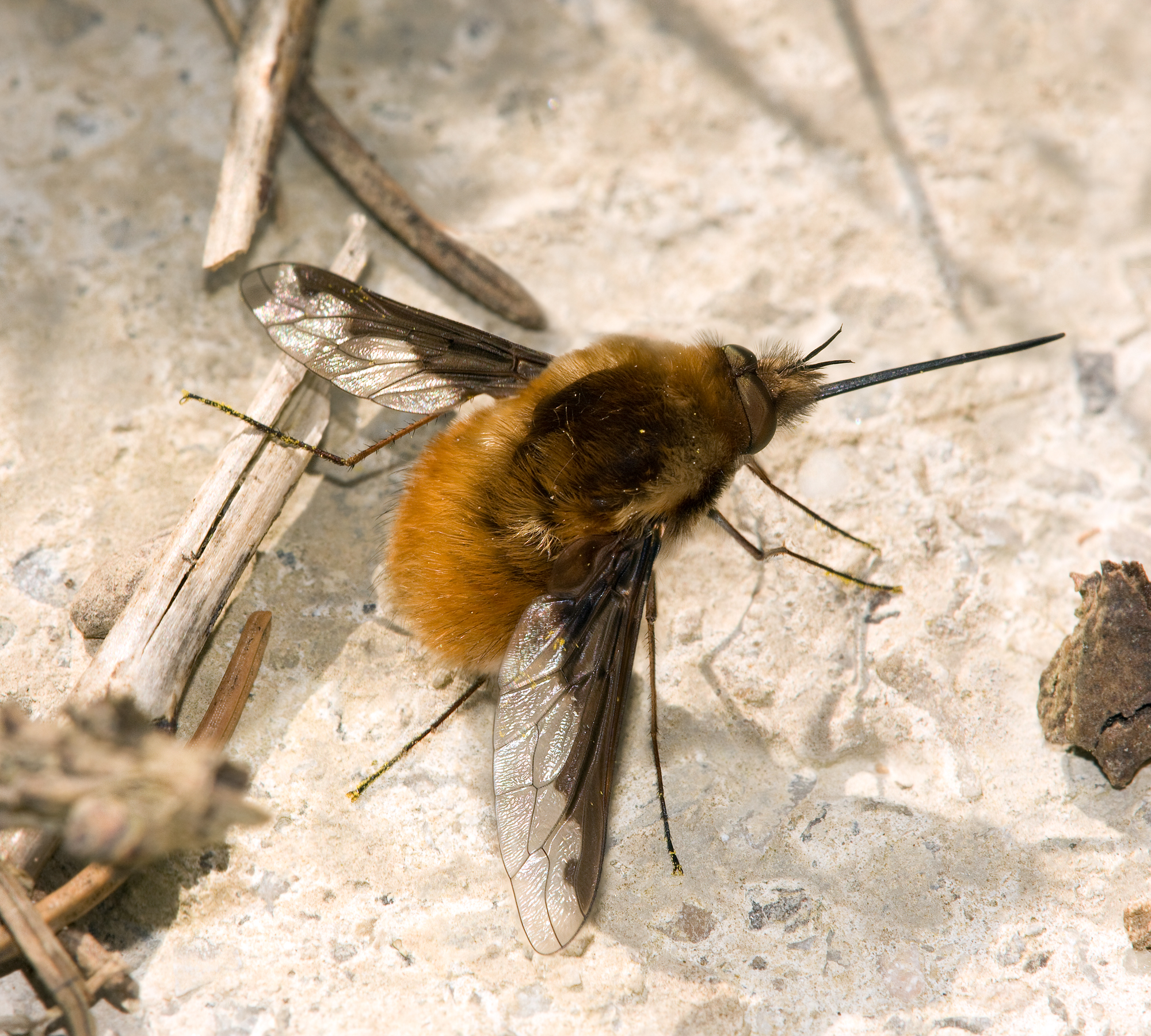

Scientific classification
- Kingdom: Animalia
- Phylum: Arthropoda
- Clade: Pancrustacea
- Class: Insecta
- Order: Diptera
- Family: Bombyliidae
- Genus: Bombylius
- Species: B. major

Binomial name
- Bombylius major Linnaeus, 1758

Synonyms
- Large bee-fly or dark-edged bee-fly: Bombylius anonymus Sulzer, 1761; Bombylius variegatus De Geer, 1776; Bombylius aequalis Fabricius, 1781; Asilus lanigerus Geoffroy, 1785; Bombylius fratellus Wiedemann, 1828; Bombylius consanguineus Macquart, 1840; Bombylius vicinus Macquart, 1840; Bombylius albipectus Macquart, 1855; Bombylius australis Lioy, 1855; Bombylius basilinea Lioy, 1855; Bombylius antenoreus Lioy, 1864

= Bombylius major =

Species of fly

Bombylius major (commonly named the large bee-fly, the dark-edged bee-fly or the greater bee fly) is a parasitic bee mimic fly. B. major is the most common type of fly within the Bombylius genus. The fly derives its name from its close resemblance to bumblebees and is often mistaken for them.

Bombylius major exhibits a unique flight behavior known as "yawing" and plays a role in general pollination, without preference of flower types. The fly does not bite, sting, or spread disease. However, the fly uses this mimicry of bumblebees to its own advantage, allowing close access to host solitary bee and wasp nests in order to deposit its eggs. After hatching, the larvae find their way into the nests to parasitically feed on the grubs.

== Description ==
Bombylius major is part of the family Bombyliidae, with a reported 6000 species worldwide. The subfamily Bombyliinae contains approximately 1100 identified species. The genus Bombylius currently comprises around 450 described species.

Bombylius major can be found from April to June throughout temperate Europe, North America and some parts of Asia, concentrated in the northern hemisphere. The species occurs across a variety of environments, from arid to moist.

== Morphology ==
Large bee fly in early springtime (video, 2m 10s)

The adult body size varies from 6.3 to 12 mm in length and is considered a relatively medium-sized fly. The body color is dark, but is densely covered by a thick coat of lighter color hairs. The head is typically brown and black hairs, but the lower portion of the head is mostly white hairs. It has dark patches on the anterior half of the wings and long hairy legs that dangle while in flight. The dark wing span can range from 8.4 to 14 mm and has a dark brown edge. Their boldly patterned wings have a distinct dividing border through the horizontal middle between the dark and clear portions. Their antennae are typically very short and pointed.Seguy (1927) provides a key to most European Bombyliidae Additionally, the species has long legs and a long rigid proboscis found in the front of the head, which is used to feed on the nectar of flowers. The proboscis ranges from 5.5 to 7.5 mm in length. While its wings continue to beat, its front legs grip the flower and its long rigid beak is inserted to collect the nectar. Despite its fearsome appearance, the beak is quite harmless. Males are typically smaller than females. Movement is categorized by both hovering and darting between locations. The flies also emit a high-pitched buzz.

=== Mimicry ===
The species gets its common name from its similarity in appearance to bees. This mimicry likely confers some defense against predation. However, there are several distinguishing features: B. major has only one pair of wings (bees have two), extremely thin legs, and the head is very small, with a long rigid proboscis.

== Life cycle ==
Flicking an egg

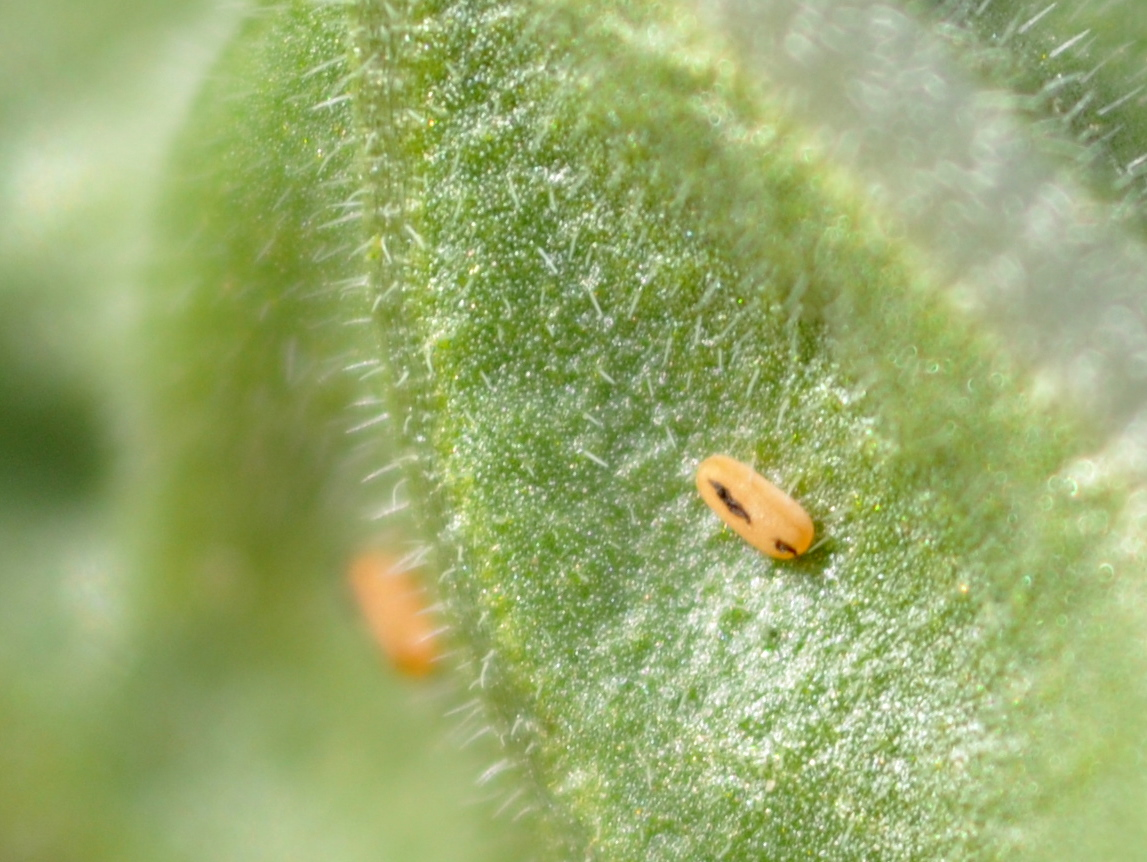
Bombylius major egg

Bombylius major is mostly seen in the spring, beginning to appear at the end of March and large numbers seen until the end of May, with the species being sighted into June.

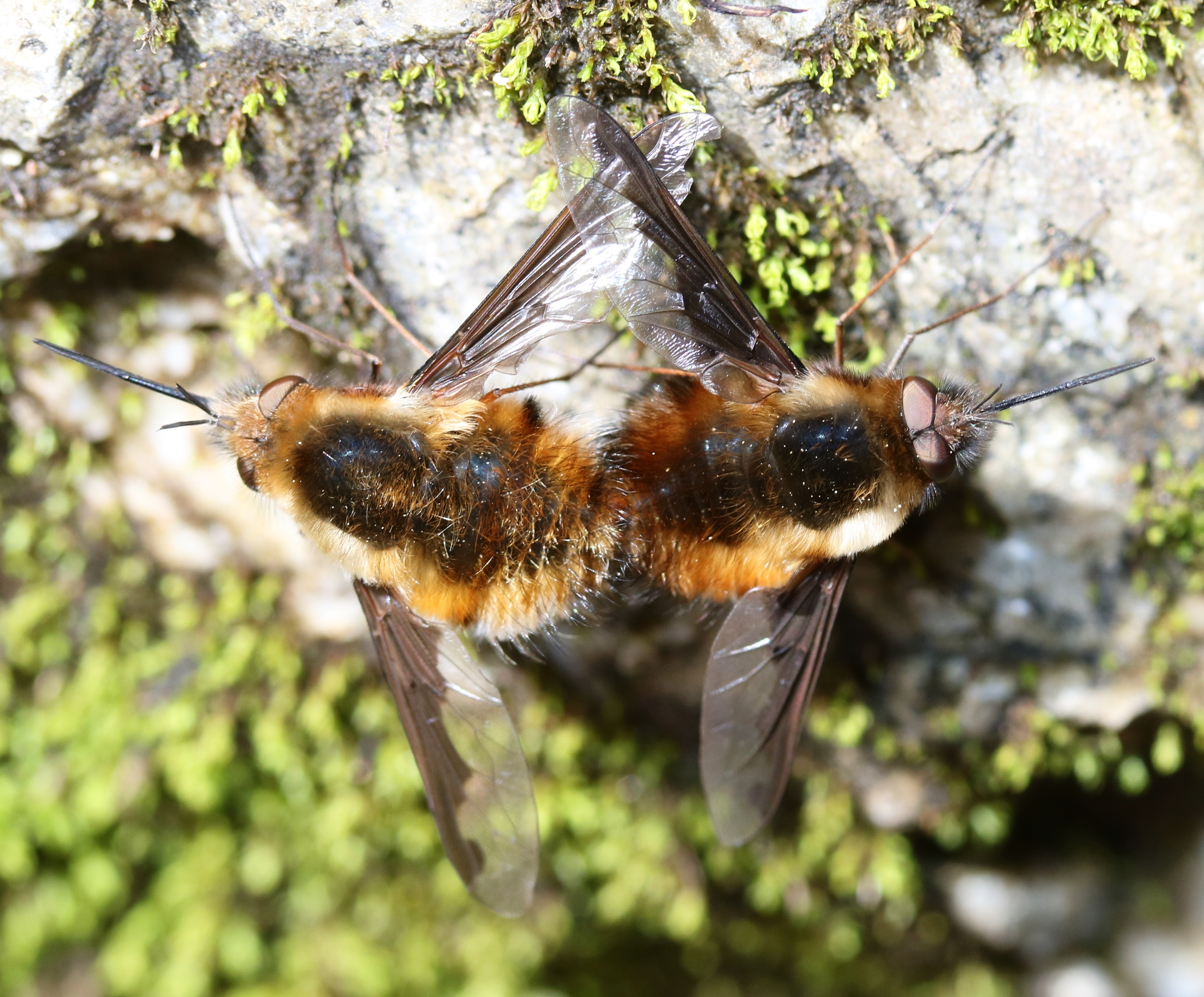
Bombylius major mating in Suzuka Mountains, Inabe, Mie prefecture, Japan.

Bombylius major has several host species, including the brood of solitary wasps and bees, particularly digging bees such as Andrena. Egg deposition takes place by the female hovering above the entrance of a host insect nest, usually a solitary bee, and throwing down her eggs using a flicking movement. The larvae are hypermetamorphic parasitoids which then feed on the food stored, as well as the young solitary bees or wasps. If the female is unable to flick her eggs near the nest, she plants them on flowers visited by the host insects. The developing larvae then make their way to the host nest or attach themselves to the bees or wasps to then be carried to the nest.

=== Egg ===
The parasitic eggs of B. major are produced in large numbers, however few will make it to the host insect burrow entrance. The female fly will dip down and coat her rear abdomen with dust that covers the eggs as they leave the female.

=== Larvae ===
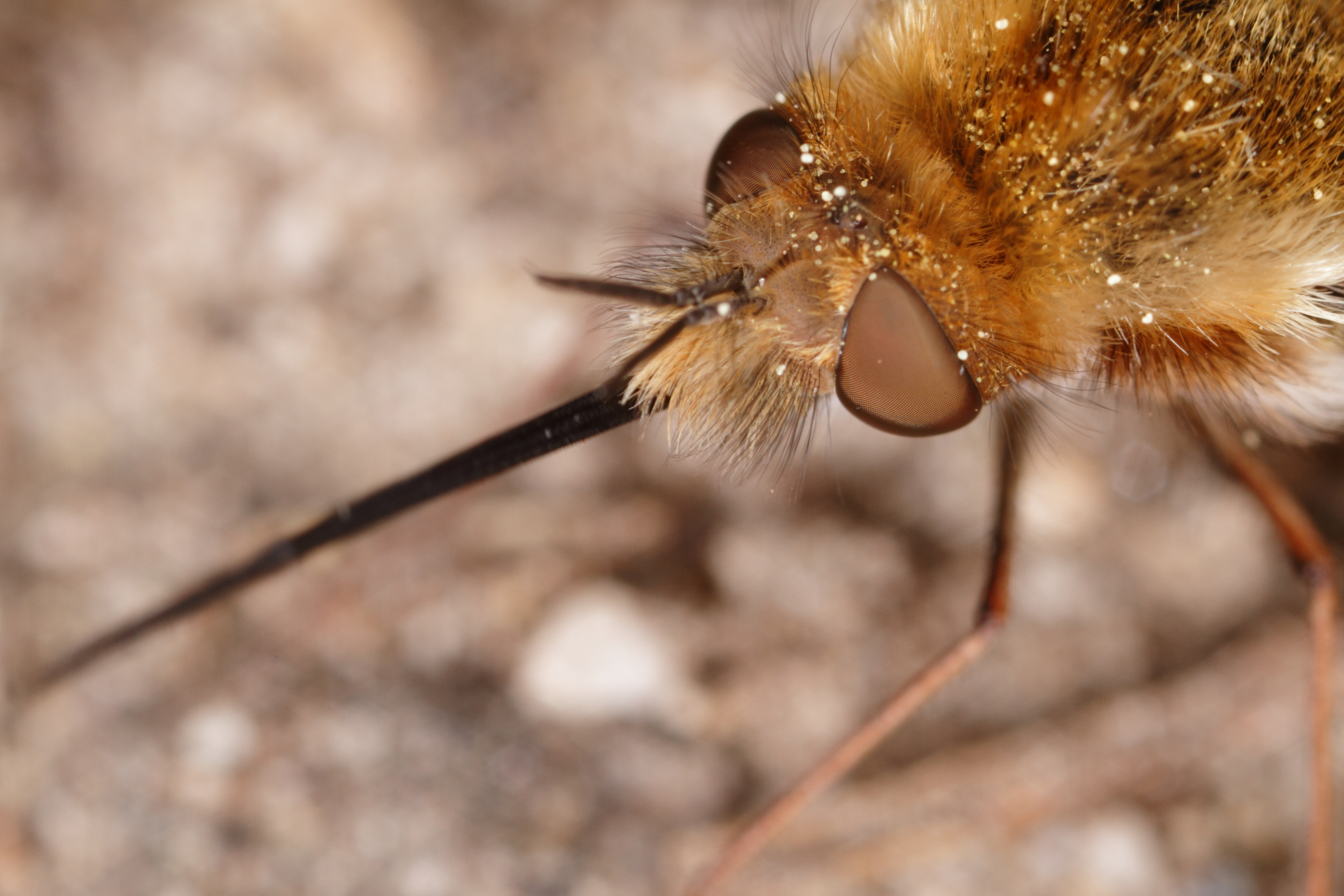
B. major adult

Larvae live parasitically in the nests of various solitary bees and wasps. When the fly larva locates a host larva, it will consume it slowly, greatly increasing in size as it tightly holds onto the host, eventually becoming a pupa and overwintering.

=== Pupae ===
White larvae gradually turn into a yellowish brown pupa, with distinct mouthparts, wings, antennae, and legs.

== Diet ==
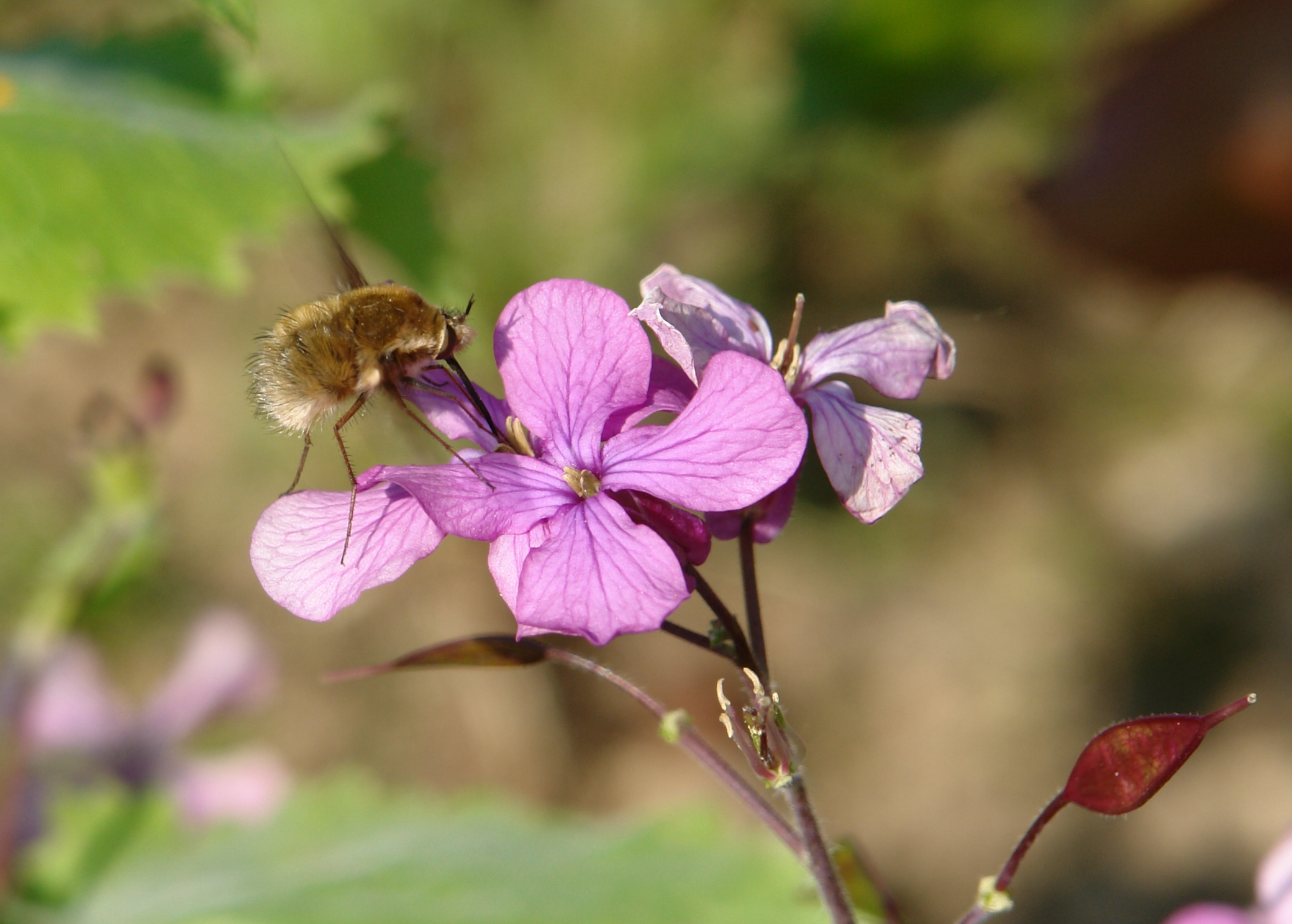
Bombylius major feeding on nectar

The species sometimes acts as a nectar robber, sometimes as a pollinator; this foraging behavior allows the species to feed on floral nectar, which is an essential part of adult fly diets. This is facilitated by the characteristic long proboscis of the fly, which is horizontally inserted into the flower. This occurs as the fly continues to buzz in the air, sometimes without touching either the anthers or stigma of the flower. However, in some plant species such as Claytonia virginica, bee flies can be effective pollinators. The fly also consumes pollen as part of its diet, with considerable differences between the sexes. Males and females visit the same range of flowers as a food source.

Along with one other species, Bombylius pygmaeus, B. major was observed to selectively (and almost exclusively) visit bluets at several North American sites despite the abundant presence of many other flowers. Of the other pollinators present, these flies were also the most frequent visitors to the flowers.

=== Female ===
In Russia, female B. major act in a narrow oligophagous manner, favoring a limited number of food sources, including pollen grains of Siberian squill (Scilla siberica), lesser celandine (Ficaria verna), and willow (Salix caprea) over dandelion (Taraxacum officinale), coltsfoot (Tussilago farfara), and primrose (Primula vulgaris).

=== Male ===
In the same study, male B. major preferred plants similar to females, with the exception of dandelion. However, an examination of the gut showed a regularly lower amount of pollen than in females. Males consistently consume less quantities of pollen than females. Ingestion of pollen differs throughout a male life cycle, with more pollen being consumed towards earlier stages. Overall, males had a preference for nectar and fed on significantly greater portions of nectar over pollen.

== Behavior ==
There is continued research on the behavior of B. major in respect to environmental factors, mating, and human interaction.

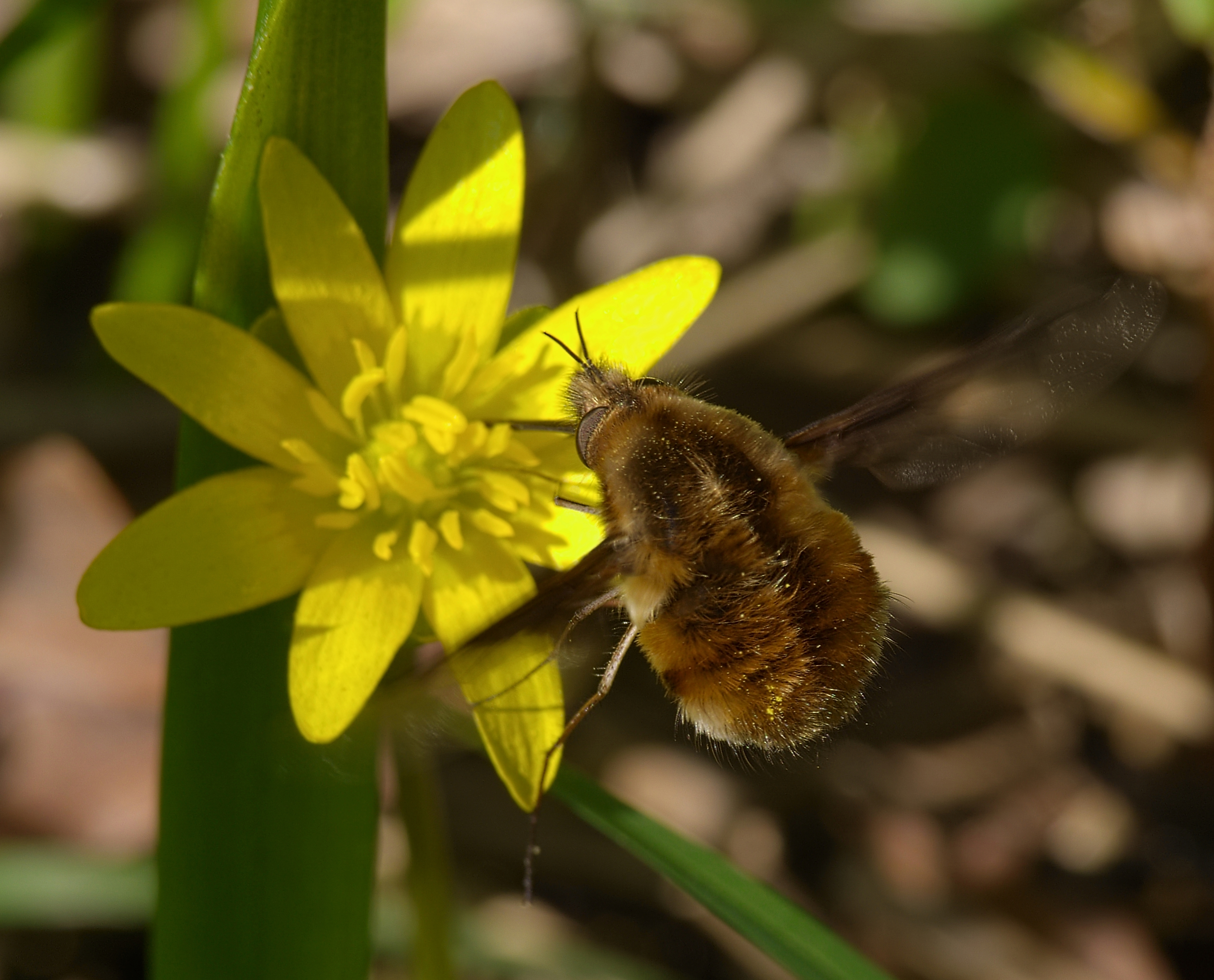
In flight

=== Flight ===
It has been discovered that the fly is capable of a unique type of flight behavior, which was discovered with the use of a high speed camera. In this behavior, the flies are seen to rotate around a vertical axis as they fly (this action is known as “yawing”). However, it is still unknown what can cause this behavior to be triggered and what purpose it serves, but a proposed explanation includes mating habits.

=== Pollinator role ===
The B. major bee-fly is a common, generalist floral pollinator, meaning that it does not give preference to one flower over another, instead pollinating a wide variety of plant families and species. The fly uses its proboscis to carry and transfer the pollen. The species is a dominant pollinator within its community, sometimes even pollinating up to two thirds of the local flowers. In addition, B. major will visit and pollinate plants that attract few other species. Some types of flowers, for example Pulmonaria officinalis, will be almost exclusively pollinated by B. major, with other species contributing a negligible amount to that plants pollination. Some flower species, such as Delphinium tricorne, are even specifically adapted to the fly in terms of color, shape, and form. If given the choice, B. major will have a consistency in plant choice.

=== Flower attraction ===
Long distance floral attraction is governed by optical sense, with color being the most important factor. The flies are typically more attracted to blue and violet colors, and occasionally yellow, over orange and pink. However, short distance floral attraction is based on the fly's olfactory sense.

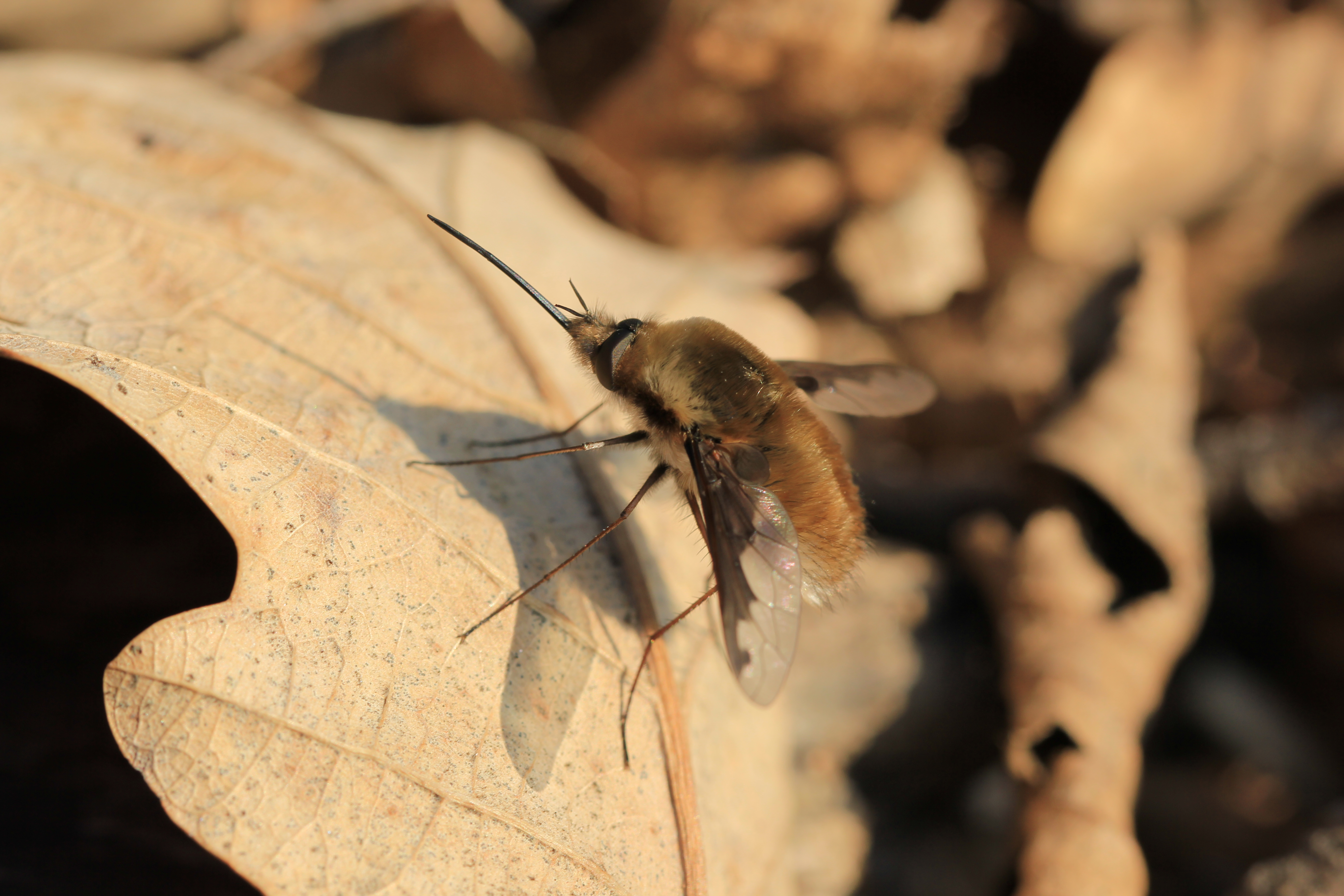
Sunbathing

=== Activity ===
The fly is mostly active during the day in warm and sunny weather conditions. B. major is attracted to sunnier places and is more likely to pollinate these areas, with a larger average of flower visits in areas of higher amounts of sunshine. The fly will hide in the trees during the night and usually dart away from a cast shadow.
