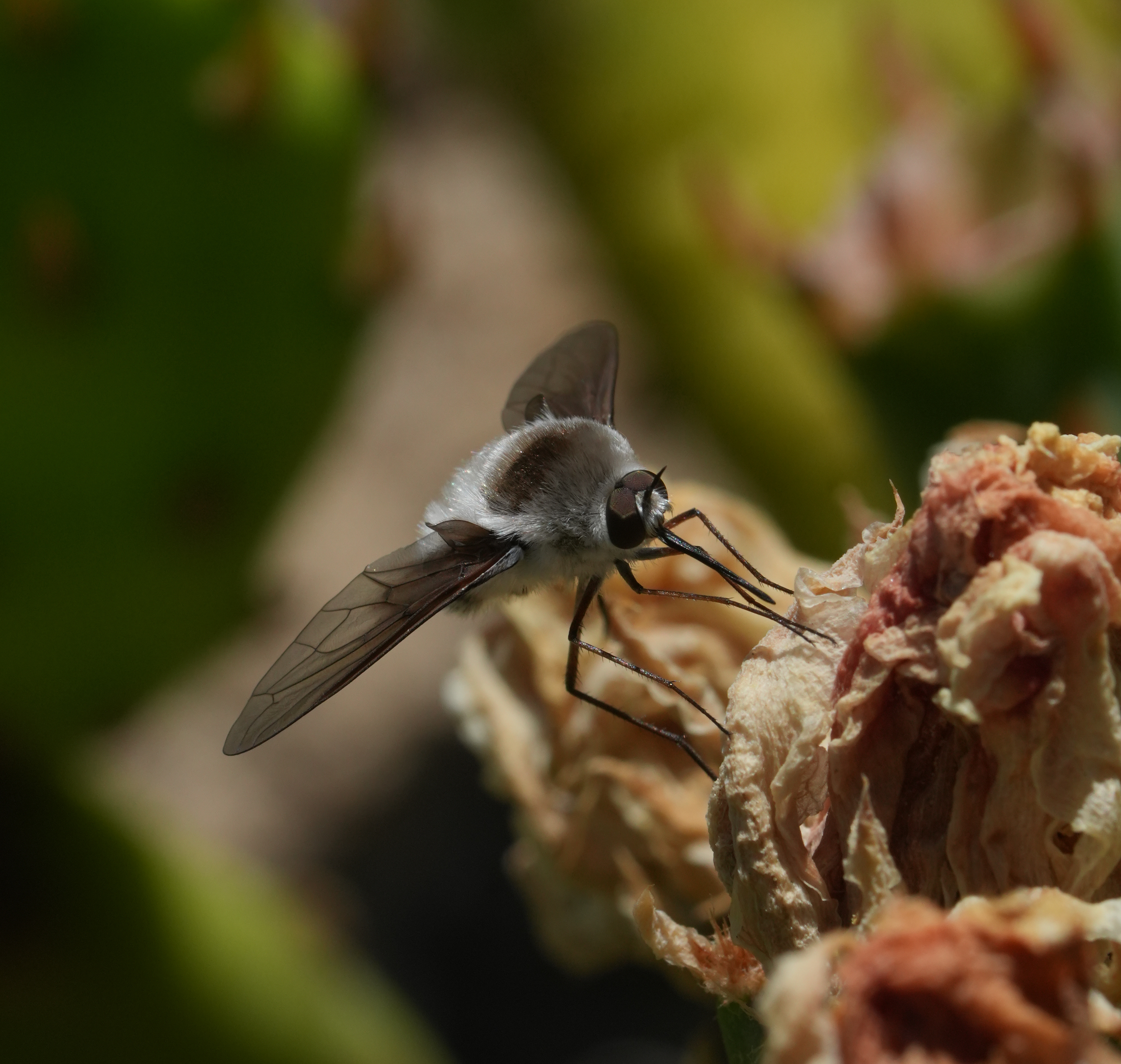
- Bombylius incanus

Scientific classification
- Kingdom: Animalia
- Phylum: Arthropoda
- Clade: Pancrustacea
- Class: Insecta
- Order: Diptera
- Family: Bombyliidae
- Tribe: Bombyliini
- Genus: Bombylius
- Species: B. incanus

Binomial name
- Bombylius incanus Johnson, 1907

= Bombylius incanus =

Species of fly

Bombylius incanus is a species of bee fly in the family Bombyliidae. It was described from Massachusetts in 1907.

== Taxonomy ==
Bombylius incanus was described by Charles Willison Johnson in 1907 in a review of eastern United States species of Bombylius. It is placed in the subgenus Zephyrectes as Bombylius (Zephyrectes) incanus. The holotype is held in the entomology collection of the Museum of Comparative Zoology and was collected at Provincetown, Massachusetts, on 27 June 1904.

== Description ==
Bombylius incanus is a pale, white-pilose bee fly: the face and cheeks are clothed with white pile, the body pile is mostly white, and the mesonotum and posterior margins of the abdominal tergites bear scattered black to brown pile. The wings are unspotted and extensively darkened basally, with the infuscated basal area gradually blending into the clearer distal portion of the wing.

Its predominantly white pile separates it from similar eastern North American Bombylius species with darker facial pile or more yellowish dorsal pile. Adults measure about 8–10 mm long.

== Distribution and habitat ==
Bombylius incanus is a Nearctic bee fly of the eastern United States, recorded from Connecticut, the District of Columbia, Georgia, Maine, Massachusetts, Mississippi, New Jersey, and New York. It is shore-associated, with records concentrated mainly in coastal or dune habitats.
