= Bombylius mohavensis =

Scientific classification
- Domain: Eukaryota
- Kingdom: Animalia
- Phylum: Arthropoda
- Class: Insecta
- Order: Diptera
- Family: Bombyliidae
- Tribe: Bombyliini
- Genus: Bombylius
- Species: B. mohavensis

Binomial name
- Bombylius mohavensis Evenhuis, 1975

Synonyms
- Bombylius abdominalis Johnson and Johnson, 1975

Species of fly

Bombylius mohavensis is a species of bee flies in the family Bombyliidae.
