= Bombylius fraudulentus =

Scientific classification
- Domain: Eukaryota
- Kingdom: Animalia
- Phylum: Arthropoda
- Class: Insecta
- Order: Diptera
- Family: Bombyliidae
- Tribe: Bombyliini
- Genus: Bombylius
- Species: B. fraudulentus

Binomial name
- Bombylius fraudulentus Johnson, 1907

Species of fly

Bombylius fraudulentus is a species of bee flies in the family Bombyliidae.
