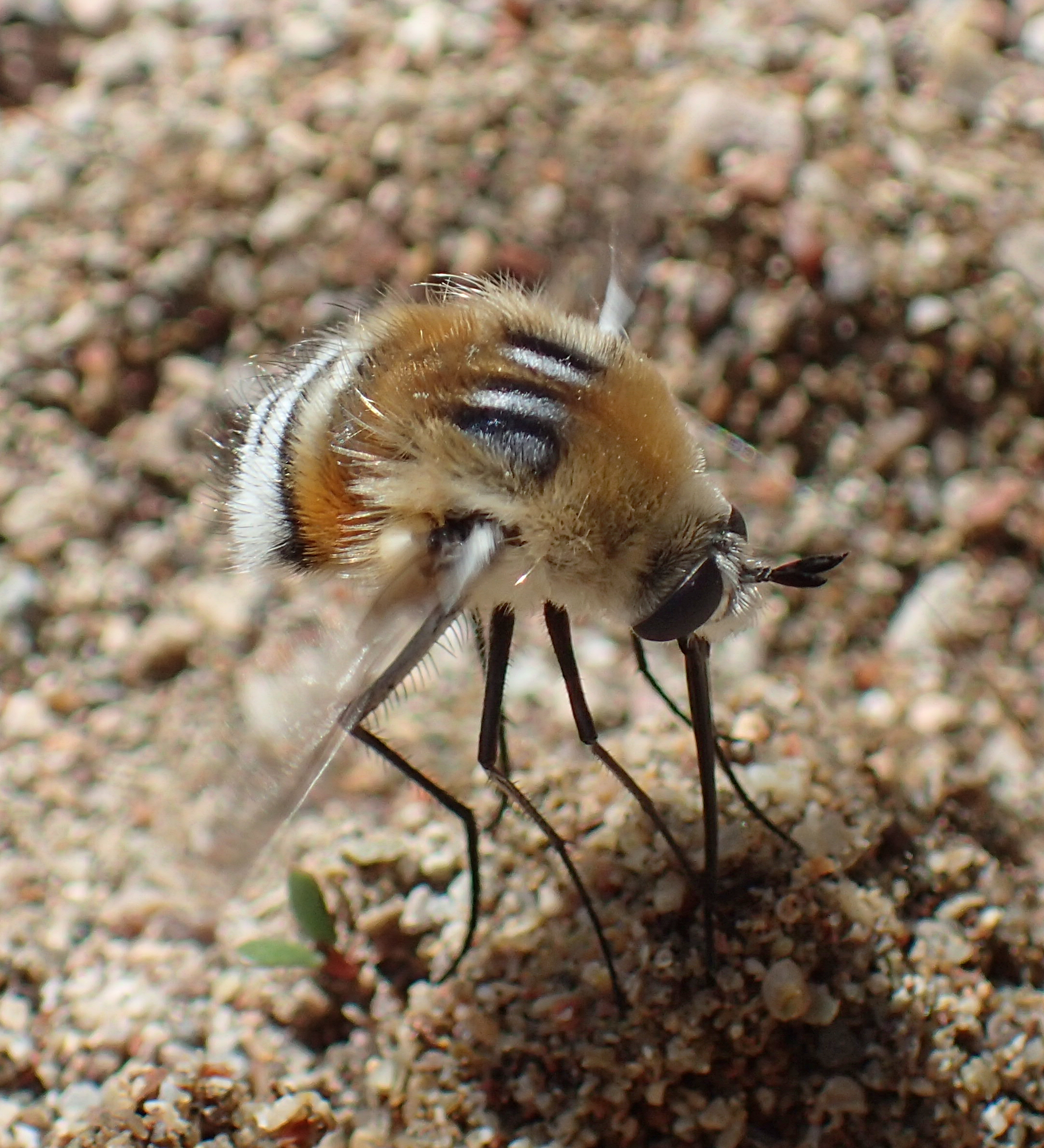
- Female in Greece

Scientific classification
- Kingdom: Animalia
- Phylum: Arthropoda
- Clade: Pancrustacea
- Class: Insecta
- Order: Diptera
- Family: Bombyliidae
- Genus: Bombylius
- Species: B. quadrifarius

Binomial name
- Bombylius quadrifarius Loew, 1855

= Bombylius quadrifarius =

Species of fly

Bombylius quadrifarius is a species of bee-fly within the family Bombyliidae found in Greece and Armenia. The species can have a wingspan up to 33 millimeters and a body length up to 10 millimeters.
