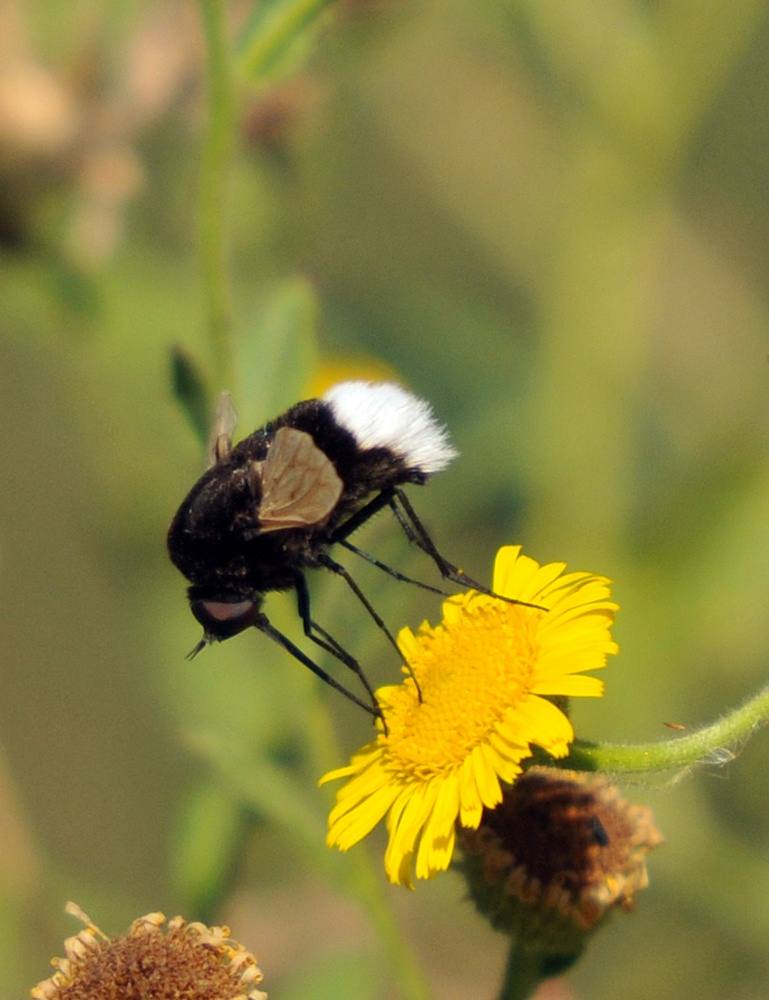

Scientific classification
- Domain: Eukaryota
- Kingdom: Animalia
- Phylum: Arthropoda
- Class: Insecta
- Order: Diptera
- Family: Bombyliidae
- Genus: Bombylius
- Species: B. varius

Binomial name
- Bombylius varius Fabricius, 1805

= Bombylius varius =

Species of fly

Bombylius varius is a species of bee flies in the family Bombyliidae.
