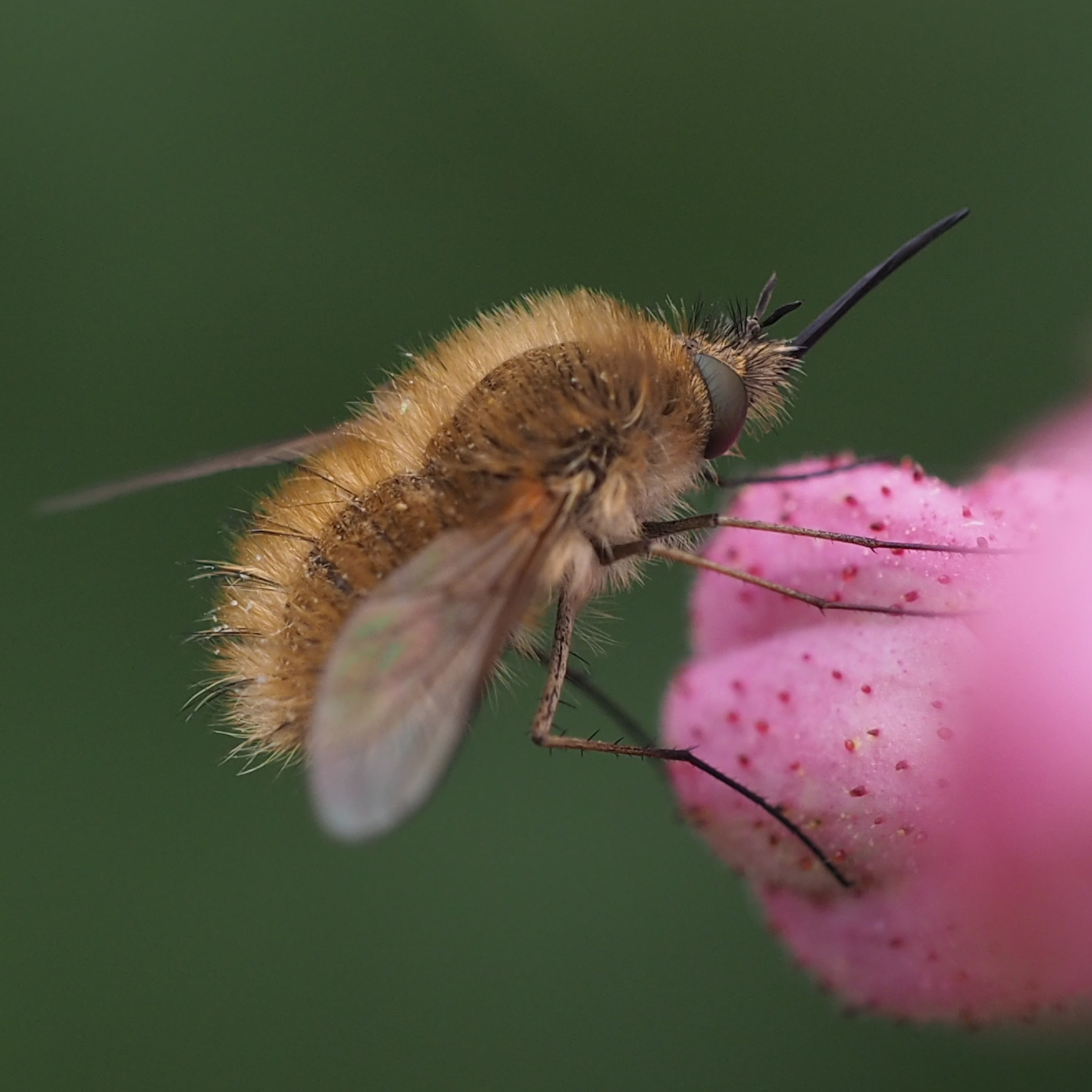

Scientific classification
- Kingdom: Animalia
- Phylum: Arthropoda
- Clade: Pancrustacea
- Class: Insecta
- Order: Diptera
- Family: Bombyliidae
- Genus: Bombylius
- Species: B. canescens

Binomial name
- Bombylius canescens Mikan, 1796

= Bombylius canescens =

Species of fly

Bombylius canescens, commonly known as the western bee-fly, is a species of bee-fly belonging to the family Bombyliidae.

Bombylius canescens is a Palearctic species with limited distribution in Europe, usually found in arid to semi-arid habitats.

== Taxonomy ==
Bombylius fugax, Bombylius cinerascens and Bombylius minor are sometimes considered synonyms of B.canescens, rather than distinct species.

== Description ==
Adult flies in the family Bombyliidae may have short or long proboscides. Variation in proboscides length is often seen at the subfamily level. B.canescens is a Bombyliid fly of the long-proboscis variety. Specimens collected in Italy had proboscis of lengths within the range of 7–9 mm. The proboscis of Bombyliid flies are not retractable. Seguy (1927) provides a key to most European Bombyliidae The species has pale tawny hairs, and has wings with the base and foremargin that are light brown. Black hair protrudes from the sides of the face and a cross-band under the antenna. The head possesses numerous long black hairs behind the eyes. The thorax does not have any black hairs between the humeri and the base of the wings. The femora is mainly black".

== Distribution ==
A general description of the range of B.canescens from 1796 includes countries across the Southern belt of Western, Central and Eastern Europe. Further sources include observe the fly in Malta, Jordan, Spain, Ireland, Turkey, Austria, Italy, Wales, and England.

== Life history ==
Bombylius fly larvae are ectoparasitoids that parasitise other insect larvae. B.canescens larvae parasitise the larvae of ground-nesting bees.

Adult B.canescens are more commonly observed in the early spring, when adult activity coincides with nest initiation of host species.

== Food resources ==
In contrast to the parasitic larvae, adult B. canescens are anthophilic and only feed on flowers. Adult B. canescens are capable of digesting pollen as well as nectar. The larval stage is the only point at which proteinaceous feeding occurs, where the larvae parasitize/predate larval bees.

In Spain, adults have been observed visiting and pollinating Petrocoptis grandiflora.

Currently, researchers have been unable to isolate a specific type of flower or plant that is exclusively pollinated by bee-flies; however, observations of B.canescens from Central Europe and Italy recorded visits by adults to the following flowers:

- Family Asteraceae
  - Arnica montana
  - Hieracium pilosella
- Family Crassulaceae
  - Sempervivum arachnoideum
- Family Caprifoliaceae
  - Knautia drymeia
- Family Hypericaceae
  - Hypericum perforatum
- Family Primulaceae
  - Primula farinosa
- Family Scrophulariaceae
  - Euphrasia officinalis
  - Veronica saxatilis

== Parental care ==
Dissection studies have revealed that females with mature oocytes in their ovaries and females with oocytes in the stage of vitellogenesis have strongly dilated crops.

Adult B.canescens are found among parasitic guilds, which include other Bombyliidae flies at aggregations of bee nests. The flies hover over bee nests to position themselves for oviposition. Females achieve oviposition into bee nests by a sudden jerk or flick of the abdomen. The mobile parasitic larvae that are oviposited into the nest initially feed on provisions meant for bee larvae, then hypermetamorphosise into carnivores.

== Interactions with other species ==
Bombylius canescens have been observed targeting bees as host species across the Lasioglossum, Andrena, Halictus and Odynerus genera. Adults have also been observed searching for nests of Panurgus banksianus, a potential host species.

== Physiology ==
Bombylius canescens specimens were studied in a study of cranial physiology done on Brachycera flies. Observations from the specimen guided the conclusion that the mushroom body calyx is well developed in flies of the order Bombyliidae.

== Conservation ==
Bombylius canescens has not been assigned a threat rating by the IUCN.
