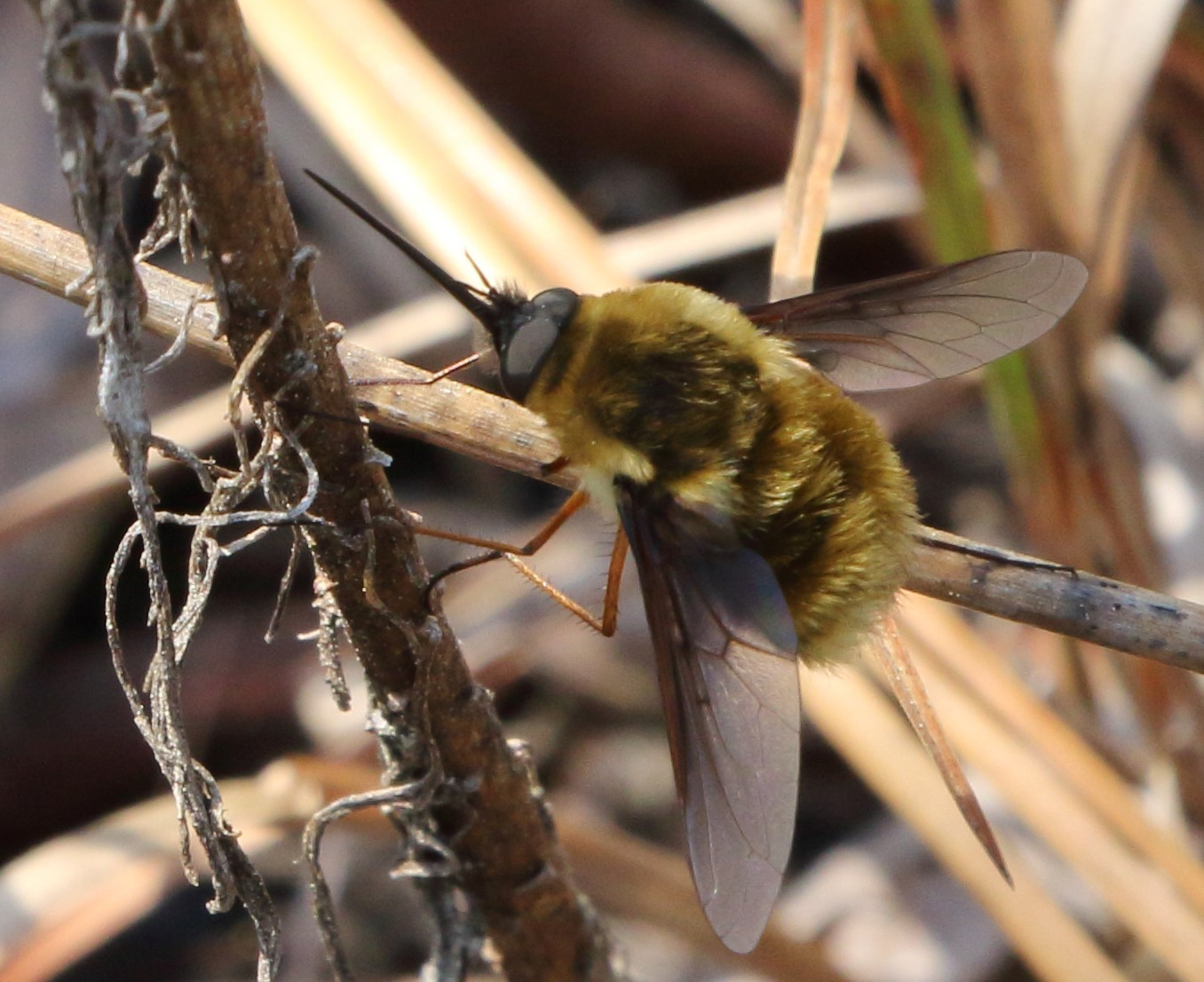

Scientific classification
- Domain: Eukaryota
- Kingdom: Animalia
- Phylum: Arthropoda
- Class: Insecta
- Order: Diptera
- Family: Bombyliidae
- Tribe: Bombyliini
- Genus: Bombylius
- Species: B. atriceps

Binomial name
- Bombylius atriceps Loew, 1863

Synonyms
- Bombylius subvarius Johnson, 1907

= Bombylius atriceps =

Species of fly

Bombylius atriceps is a species of bee fly in the family Bombyliidae.
