= Bombylius curtirhynchus =

Scientific classification
- Domain: Eukaryota
- Kingdom: Animalia
- Phylum: Arthropoda
- Class: Insecta
- Order: Diptera
- Family: Bombyliidae
- Tribe: Bombyliini
- Genus: Bombylius
- Species: B. curtirhynchus

Binomial name
- Bombylius curtirhynchus Evenhuis, 1978

Synonyms
- Bombylius longilineatus Bath, 1974

Species of fly

Bombylius curtirhynchus is a species of bee flies in the family Bombyliidae.
