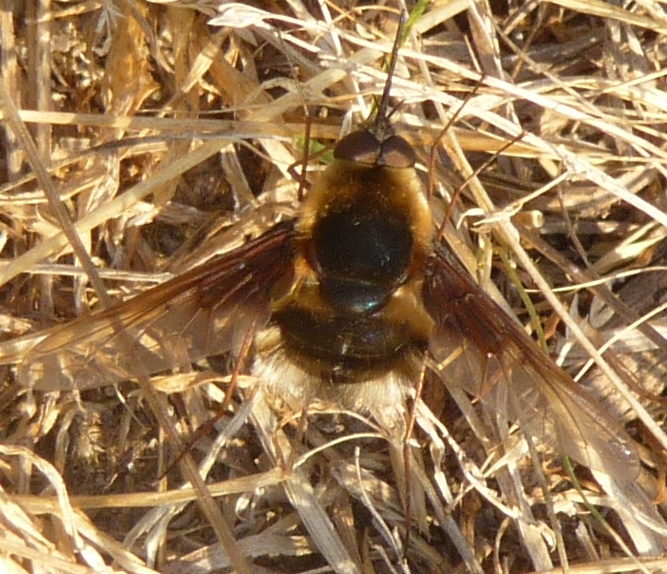

Scientific classification
- Kingdom: Animalia
- Phylum: Arthropoda
- Class: Insecta
- Order: Diptera
- Family: Bombyliidae
- Genus: Bombylius
- Species: B. helvus

Binomial name
- Bombylius helvus Wiedemann, 1821

Synonyms
- Bombylius azaleae (Shannon, 1916); Bombylius maculifer (Walker, 1852)

= Bombylius helvus =

Species of fly

Bombylius helvus is a species of North American bee flies. It was first described by Christian Rudolph Wilhelm Wiedemann in 1821.
