= Bombylius aurifer =

Scientific classification
- Domain: Eukaryota
- Kingdom: Animalia
- Phylum: Arthropoda
- Class: Insecta
- Order: Diptera
- Family: Bombyliidae
- Genus: Bombylius
- Species: B. aurifer

Binomial name
- Bombylius aurifer Osten Sacken, 1877

Species of fly

Bombylius aurifer is a species of bee fly in the family Bombyliidae. It occurs in western North America.
