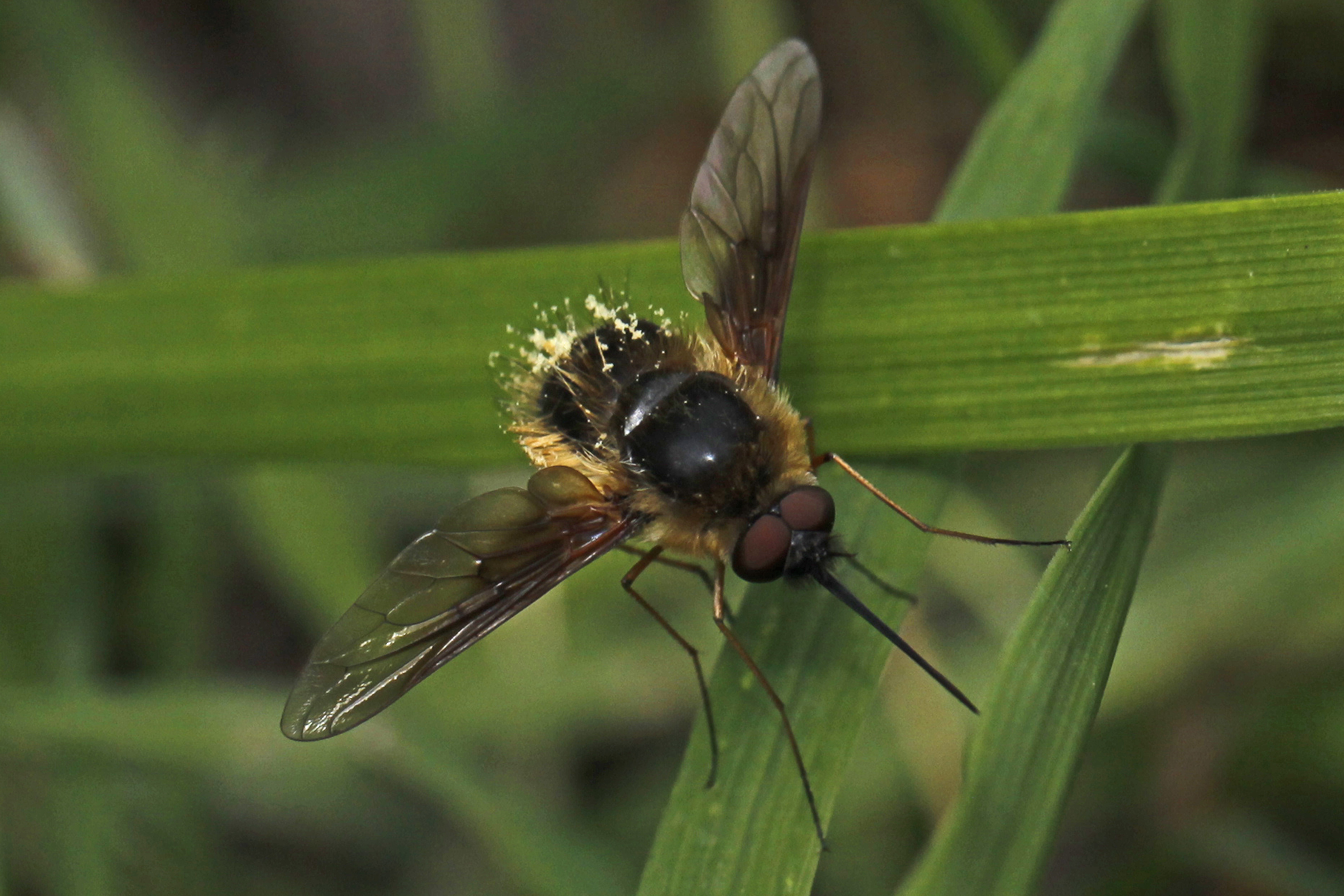

Scientific classification
- Domain: Eukaryota
- Kingdom: Animalia
- Phylum: Arthropoda
- Class: Insecta
- Order: Diptera
- Family: Bombyliidae
- Genus: Bombylius
- Species: B. mexicanus

Binomial name
- Bombylius mexicanus Wiedemann, 1821

Synonyms
- Bombylius fulvibasis Macquart, 1855; Bombylius philadelphicus Macquart, 1840

= Bombylius mexicanus =

Species of fly

Bombylius mexicanus is a species of bee fly in the family Bombyliidae. Despite its name, it is widespread in North America, from Ontario and British Columbia in Canada, south through the United States and into Mexico.

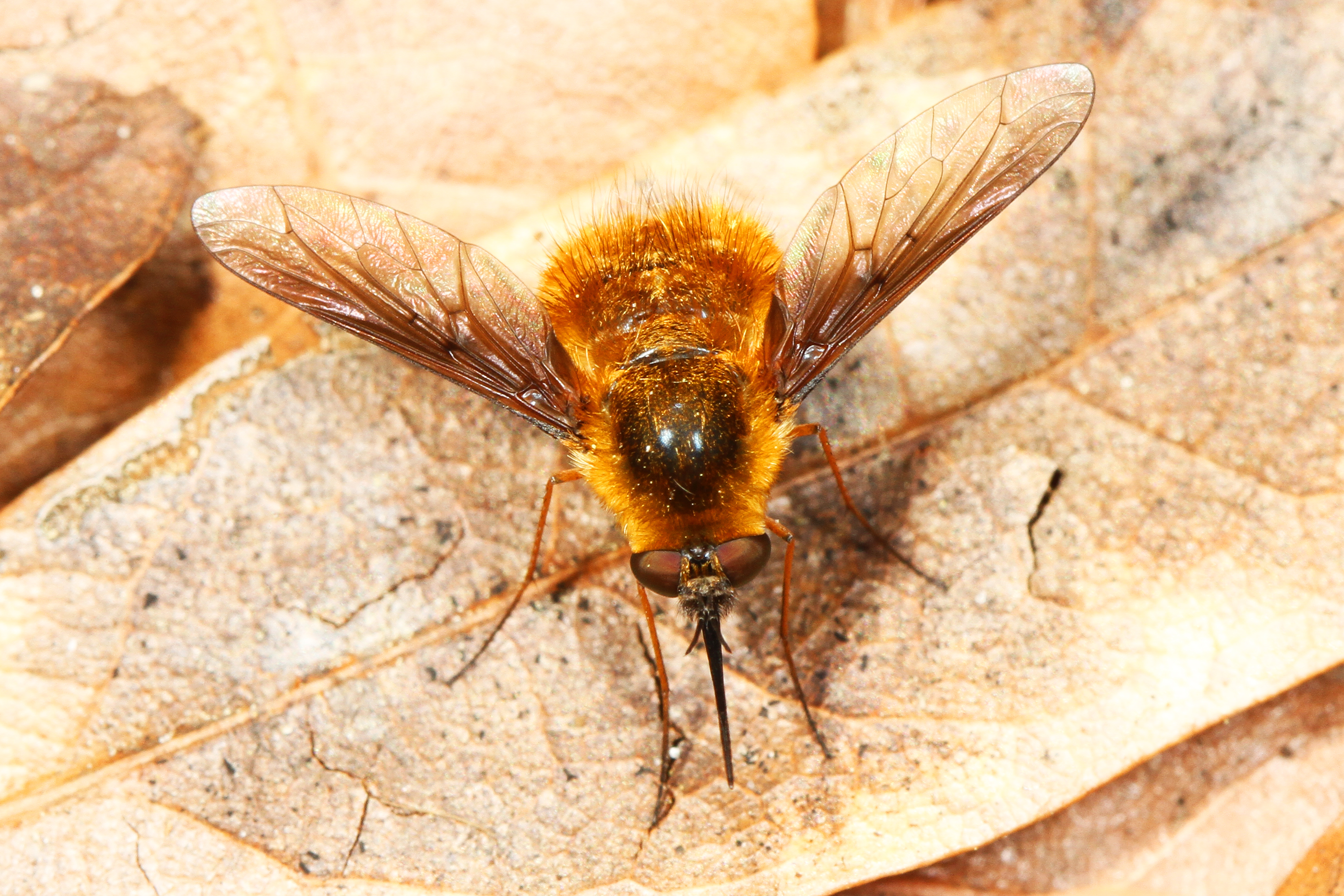
