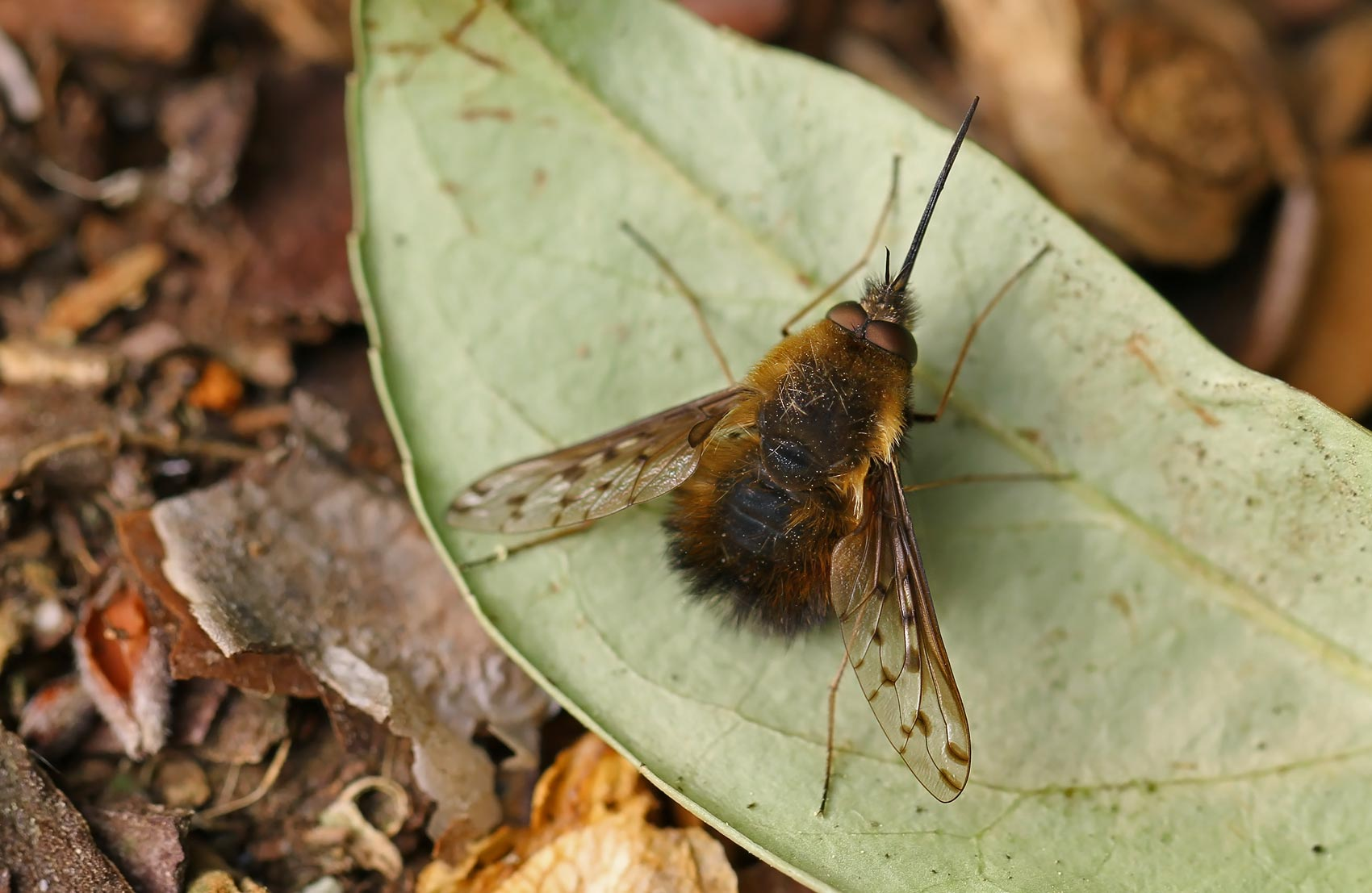
- Bombylius discolor Germany

Scientific classification
- Kingdom: Animalia
- Phylum: Arthropoda
- Clade: Pancrustacea
- Class: Insecta
- Order: Diptera
- Family: Bombyliidae
- Tribe: Bombyliini
- Genus: Bombylius
- Species: B. discolor

Binomial name
- Bombylius discolor Mikan, 1796

= Bombylius discolor =

Species of fly

Bombylius discolor is a Palearctic species of fly in the family Bombyliidae. Seguy (1927) provides a key to most European Bombyliidae
