= Bombylius comanche =

Scientific classification
- Domain: Eukaryota
- Kingdom: Animalia
- Phylum: Arthropoda
- Class: Insecta
- Order: Diptera
- Family: Bombyliidae
- Genus: Bombylius
- Species: B. comanche

Binomial name
- Bombylius comanche Painter, 1962

Species of fly

Bombylius comanche is a species of bee flies in the family Bombyliidae.
