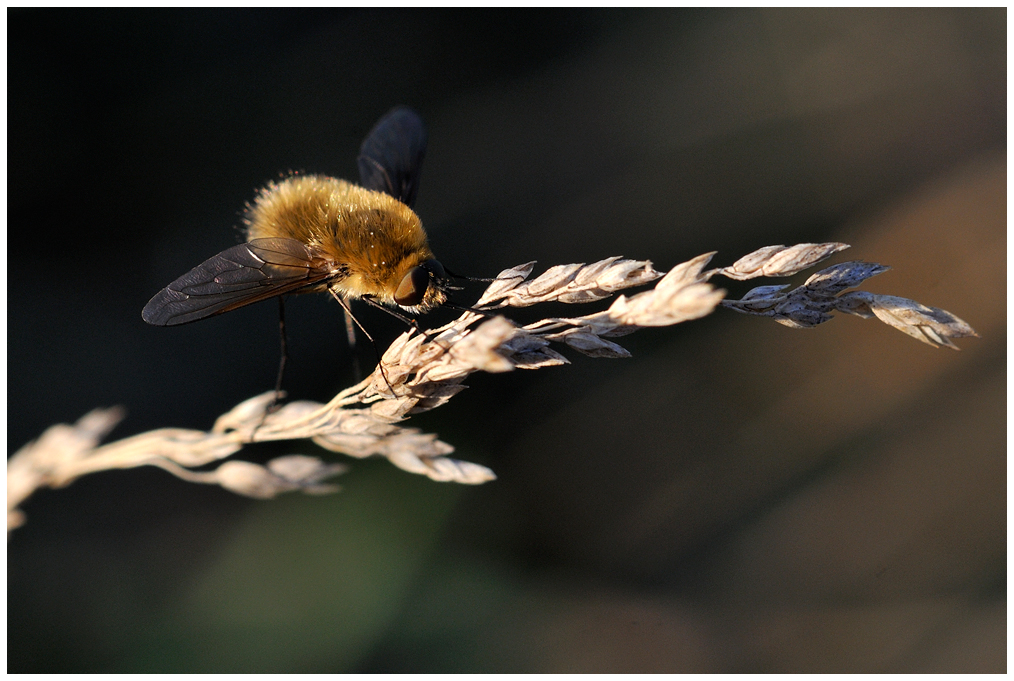
- Bombylius minor France

Scientific classification
- Kingdom: Animalia
- Phylum: Arthropoda
- Clade: Pancrustacea
- Class: Insecta
- Order: Diptera
- Family: Bombyliidae
- Genus: Bombylius
- Species: B. minor

Binomial name
- Bombylius minor Linnaeus, 1758

= Bombylius minor =

Heath Bee Fly

Species of fly

Bombylius minor, the heath bee fly, is a Palearctic species of bee fly in the family Bombyliidae.

== Identification ==
Seguy (1927) provides a key to most European Bombyliidae

== Distribution ==
The heath bee fly is native to Europe, where it has a cosmopolitan distribution. It is found in: Scandinavia, all of the Baltics (except Latvia), Russia, Ukraine, Greece, Montenegro, Croatia, Slovakia, Poland, Germany, Denmark, Netherlands, France, Iberia, United Kingdom, Isle of Man, Italy, and Austria.
