= Bombylius diegoensis =

Scientific classification
- Domain: Eukaryota
- Kingdom: Animalia
- Phylum: Arthropoda
- Class: Insecta
- Order: Diptera
- Family: Bombyliidae
- Tribe: Bombyliini
- Genus: Bombylius
- Species: B. diegoensis

Binomial name
- Bombylius diegoensis Painter, 1933

Species of fly

Bombylius diegoensis is a species of bee flies in the family Bombyliidae.
