= Bombylius anthophilus =

Scientific classification
- Domain: Eukaryota
- Kingdom: Animalia
- Phylum: Arthropoda
- Class: Insecta
- Order: Diptera
- Family: Bombyliidae
- Tribe: Bombyliini
- Genus: Bombylius
- Species: B. anthophilus

Binomial name
- Bombylius anthophilus Evenhius, 1983

Species of fly

Bombylius anthophilus is a species of bee flies in the family Bombyliidae. The species can be found in the nests and pupal casings of Habropoda depressa bees.
