= Bombylius albicapillus =

Scientific classification
- Domain: Eukaryota
- Kingdom: Animalia
- Phylum: Arthropoda
- Class: Insecta
- Order: Diptera
- Family: Bombyliidae
- Genus: Bombylius
- Species: B. albicapillus

Binomial name
- Bombylius albicapillus Loew, 1872

Synonyms
- Bombylius heximaculatus Johnson and Johnson, 1975

Species of fly

Bombylius albicapillus is a species of bee fly in the family Bombyliidae. It occurs in western North America.
