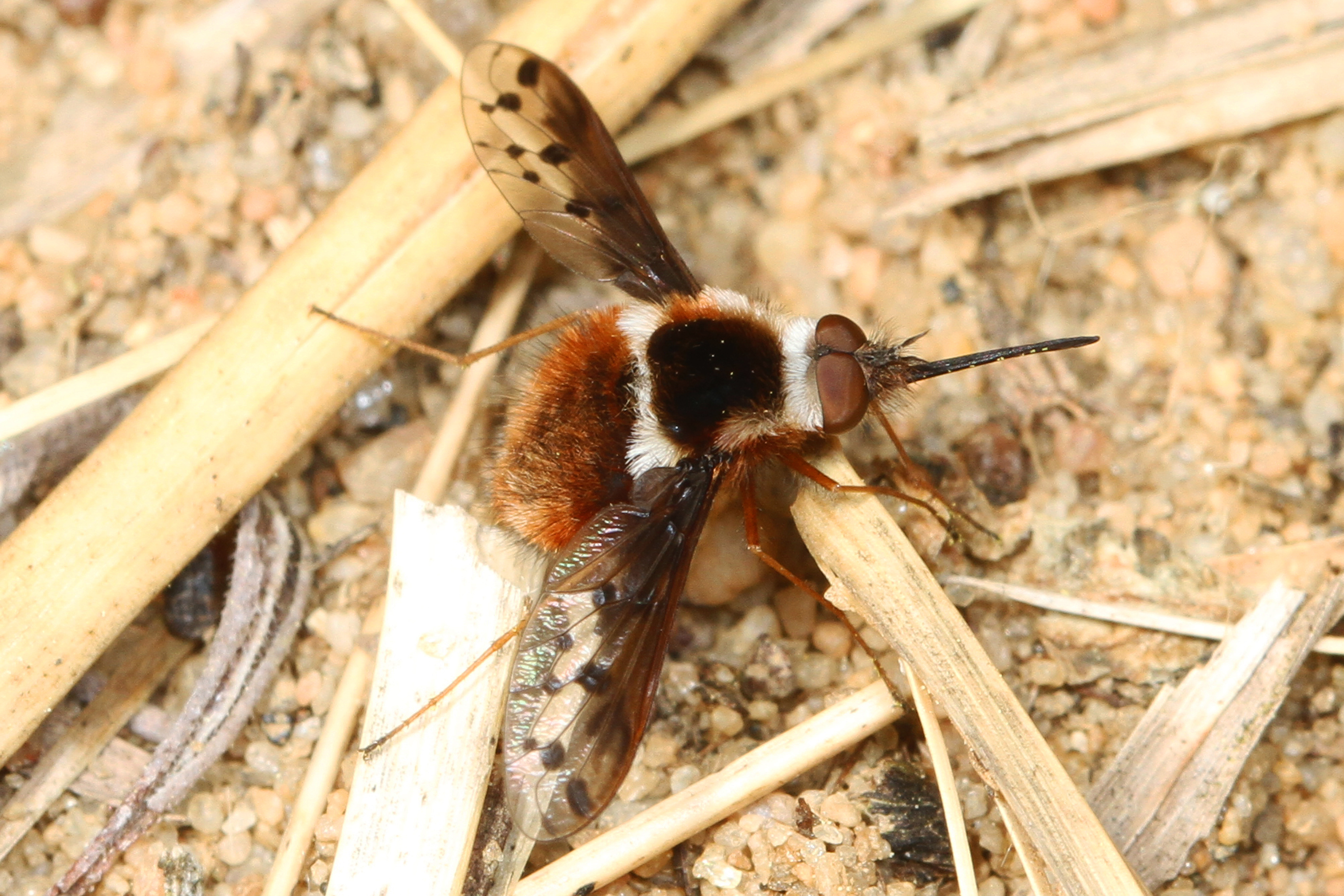

Scientific classification
- Domain: Eukaryota
- Kingdom: Animalia
- Phylum: Arthropoda
- Class: Insecta
- Order: Diptera
- Family: Bombyliidae
- Genus: Bombylius
- Species: B. pygmaeus

Binomial name
- Bombylius pygmaeus Fabricius, 1781

= Bombylius pygmaeus =

Species of fly

Bombylius pygmaeus is a species of bee fly in the family Bombyliidae. It is common in Canada and the United States, and is also reported from China.
