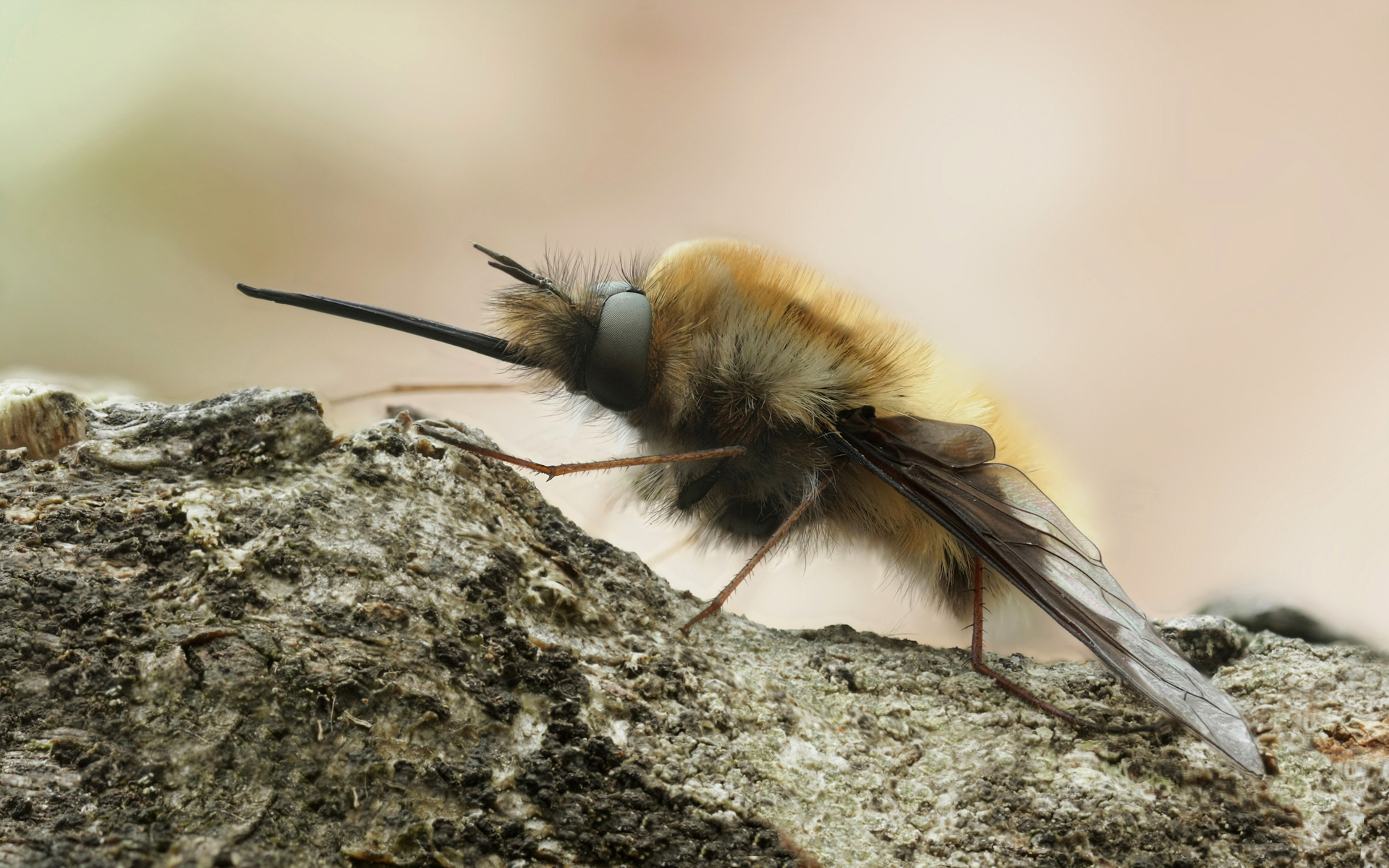
- Bombylius major

Scientific classification
- Kingdom: Animalia
- Phylum: Arthropoda
- Class: Insecta
- Order: Diptera
- Family: Bombyliidae
- Tribe: Bombyliini
- Genus: Bombylius; Linnaeus, 1758

Type species
- B. major Linnaeus, 1758

Synonyms
- Choristus Walker, 1852; Parisus Walker, 1852; Triplasius Loew, 1855

= Bombylius =

Genus of flies

Bombylius is a large genus of flies belonging to the family Bombyliidae. They are known as the bee-flies, due to their striking resemblance to bees and bumblebees, and are distributed worldwide. One species of the genus, Bombylius major, is widely distributed throughout the northern hemisphere and is very well known.

== Physiology ==
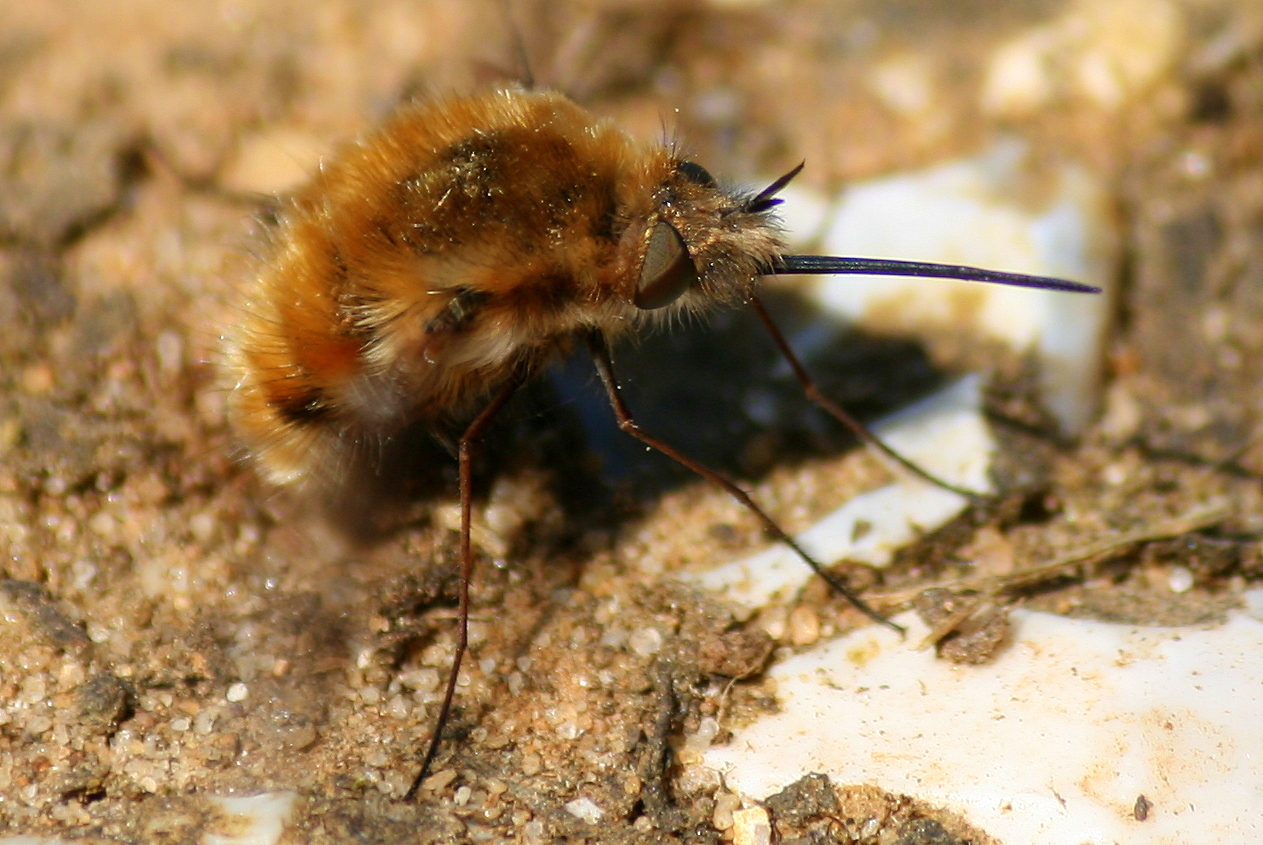
Bombylius major

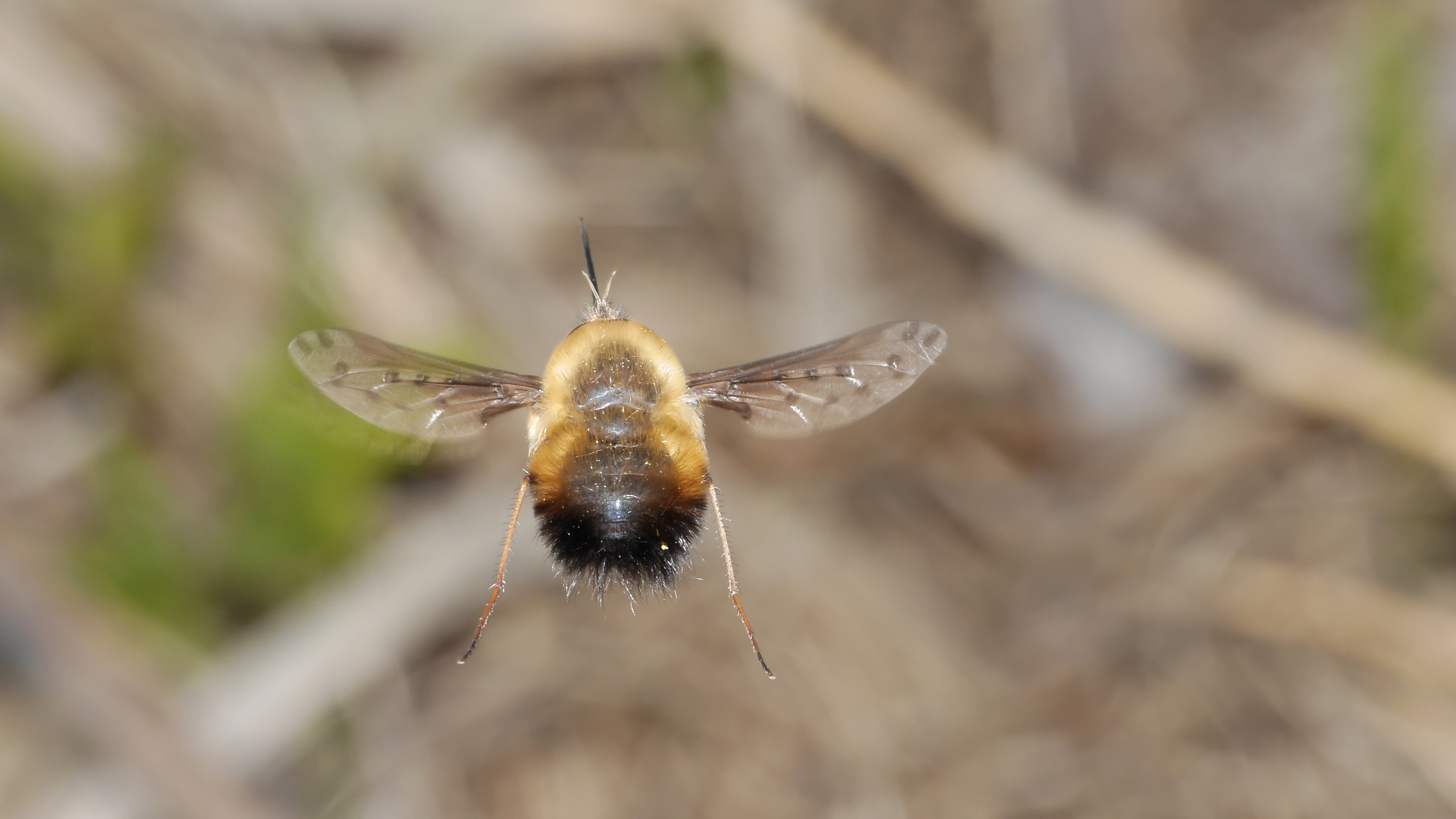
Bombylius discolor flying

All species in the genus share a similarity with the unrelated bees and bumblebees, which they mimic, possessing a thick coat of fur, with a colour ranging from yellow to orange. They can, however, be told apart from their models by the long and stiff proboscis they possess, used to probe for nectar as they fly (much like a hummingbird), by their rapid and darting flight, and by the peculiar structure of their legs. As larvae, they are parasitic and infest the nests of solitary bees (and possibly wasps), consuming their food stores and grubs.

== Species ==
=== European species ===
- Subgenus Bombylius
  - Bombylius aaroni Báez, 1983 – Canary Islands
  - Bombylius ambustus Pallas, 1818 – southern Palaearctic, Near East
  - Bombylius analis Olivier, 1789 – southern Palaearctic, Near East
  - Bombylius candidus Loew, 1855 – Palaearctic, Near East
  - Bombylius canescens Mikan, 1796 – Palaearctic, Near East
  - Bombylius cinerascens Mikan, 1796 – Europe, Near East
  - Bombylius citrinus Loew, 1855 – southern Europe, Near East
  - Bombylius discolor Mikan, 1796 – Europe, Near East
  - Bombylius fimbriatus Meigen, 1820 – Palaearctic, Near East, North Africa
  - Bombylius flavipes Wiedemann, 1828 – Italy, Spain, Near East, North Africa
  - Bombylius floccosus Loew, 1857 – southeastern Europe, Near East
  - Bombylius fulvescens Wiedemann in Meigen, 1820 – Palaearctic, Near East, North Africa
  - Bombylius fumosus Dufour, 1832 – Spain
  - Bombylius fuscus Fabricius, 1791 – southern Palaearctic, Near East, North Africa
  - Bombylius kutshurganicus Paramonov, 1926 – southern Russia, Ukraine, Moldova
  - Bombylius major Linnaeus, 1758
  - Bombylius medius Linnaeus, 1758 – Palaearctic, Near East, North Africa
  - Bombylius minor Linnaeus, 1758 – Palaearctic, Near East
  - Bombylius modestus Loew, 1873 – southern Palaearctic, Near East, North Africa
  - Bombylius mus Bigot, 1862 – southern Palaearctic, Near East, North Africa
  - Bombylius niveus Meigen, 1804 – southern Europe, Near East
  - Bombylius nubilus Mikan, 1796 – central and southern Europe, Near East, North Africa
  - Bombylius oceanus Becker, 1908 – Canary Islands
  - Bombylius pallens Wiedemann in Meigen, 1820 – Italy, Spain, Portugal
  - Bombylius pardalotus François, 1969 – Italy, Spain
  - Bombylius pintuarius Báez, 1983 – Canary Islands
  - Bombylius posticus Fabricius, 1805 – Palaearctic, Near East, North Africa
  - Bombylius pumilus Meigen, 1820 – southern Europe, Near East
  - Bombylius semifuscus Meigen, 1820 – Palaearctic, Near East, North Africa
  - Bombylius shelkovnikovi Paramonov, 1926 – Italy, Greece, eastern Palaearctic, Near East
  - Bombylius torquatus Loew, 1855 – southern Europe, Near East, North Africa
  - Bombylius trichurus Pallas, 1818 – Palaearctic, Near East
  - Bombylius venosus Mikan, 1796 – Europe, Near East
- Subgenus Zephyrectes
  - Bombylius cinerarius Pallas & Wiedemann, 1818 – southern Palaearctic, Near East, North Africa
  - Bombylius cruciatus Fabricius, 1798 – southern Europe, Near East, North Africa
  - Bombylius leucopygus Macquart, 1846 – Spain, North Africa
  - Bombylius quadrifarius Loew. 1855 – southeastern Europe, eastern Palaearctic, Near East

=== North American species ===
- Bombylius aestivus
- Bombylius albicapillus
- Bombylius altimyia
- Bombylius anthophilus
- Bombylius anthophoroides
- Bombylius arizonicus
- Bombylius atriceps
- Bombylius aureus
- Bombylius aurifer
- Bombylius auriferiodes
- Bombylius austini
- Bombylius balion
- Bombylius ballmeri
- Bombylius breviabdominalis
- Bombylius cachinnans
- Bombylius cinerivus
- Bombylius comanche
- Bombylius curtirhynchus
- Bombylius diegoensis
- Bombylius duncani
- Bombylius eboreus
- Bombylius facialis
- Bombylius fascipennis
- Bombylius flavifacies
- Bombylius flavipilosa
- Bombylius fraudulentus
- Bombylius frommerorum
- Bombylius fulvibasoides
- Bombylius helvus
- Bombylius heximaculatus
- Bombylius incanus
- Bombylius japygus
- Bombylius kanabensis
- Bombylius lancifer
- Bombylius lassenensis
- Bombylius macfarlandi
- Bombylius medorae
- Bombylius metopium
- Bombylius mexicanus
- Bombylius mohavensis
- Bombylius montanus
- Bombylius nevadensis
- Bombylius nicholsonae
- Bombylius nigriventris
- Bombylius painteri
- Bombylius pendens
- Bombylius phlogmodes
- Bombylius plichtai
- Bombylius pygmaeus
- Bombylius quirinus
- Bombylius ravus
- Bombylius silvus
- Bombylius sylphae
- Bombylius texanus
- Bombylius validus
- Bombylius varius
- Bombylius washingtoniensis
- Bombylius xanthothrix
- Bombylius zapataensis
- Bombylius zircon

=== Species worldwide ===
- List of Bombylius species
