= Plinio Corrêa de Oliveira Institute =

Roman Catholic traditionalist association

Plinio Corrêa de Oliveira Institute (IPCO)
- Founded: December 8, 2006
- Founder: Adolpho Lindenberg
- Headquarters: Rua Maranhão, 341, Higienópolis, São Paulo, Brazil
- Key people: Adolpho Lindenberg, Bertrand of Orléans-Braganza
- Website: Plinio Corrêa de Oliveira Institute (IPCO)

The Plinio Corrêa de Oliveira Institute (IPCO) (Portuguese: Instituto Plinio Corrêa de Oliveira) is a Roman Catholic traditionalist association of private law, which claims direct legacy of the Brazilian Tradition, Family and Property (TFP), and follows the beliefs of Plinio Corrêa de Oliveira. The IPCO headquarters are located at the former seat of the Brazilian TFP in Higienópolis, São Paulo, Brazil.

== Origin and purposes ==
The Plinio Corrêa de Oliveira Institute was created on 8 December 2006, by a group of members of the Association of the Founders of TFP, and its presidency went to Adolpho Lindenberg, a cousin of TFP's founder. It was founded following a legal dispute over the control of the Brazilian TFP with the group led by João Scognamiglio Clá Dias, founder of the Heralds of the Gospel, who claimed direct succession from the original TFP and was organized in 2001 as an association of Pontifical Right. The Brazilian Supreme Federal Court ruled in favor of the Heralds of the Gospel, who have legal control over the name TFP.

The IPCO's main purpose is to follow the same conservative and counter-revolutionary objectives of the original Brazilian TFP, while opposing socialism, communism, and freemasonry. It claims to work for the preservation of the "basic pillars of the Christian Civilization threatened by the anti-Christian Revolution". The IPCO, like the original TFP, supports the Tridentine Mass and is critical of the Vatican Council II. The IPCO has promoted civil mobilization campaigns in several cities across Brazil on issues such as abortion, homosexuality, and gender theory. It has also spoken against agrarian reform in Brazil, environmentalism, and Pope Francis' positions, including the encyclical Laudato si'. The Youth Wing is called Ação Jovem (Youth Action).

The IPCO members include the central core of the historical founders of TFP, and the head of the Brazilian imperial family, Prince Bertrand of Orléans-Braganza.

The IPCO publishes a monthly magazine Catolicismo and is linked with the international network of TFPs and sister organizations.
