= Jacarezinho =

Jacarezinho (lit. 'little crocodile') may refer to:

- Jacarezinho, Rio de Janeiro, Brazil
- Jacarezinho, Paraná, Brazil
- Roman Catholic Diocese of Jacarezinho, Paraná, Brazil
