= Tradition, Family, Property =

International Traditionalist Catholic movement

- Tradição, Família, Propriedade
- Abbreviation: TFP
- Successor: Instituto Plinio Corrêa de Oliveira; Heralds of the Gospel
- Formation: List: Brazil (1960); Argentina (1967); Chile (1967); Uruguay (1967); Peru (1970); Venezuela (1971); Colombia (1971); Spain (1971); Bolivia (1973); Ecuador (1973); Portugal (1974); USA (1974); Canada (1975); Italy (1976); France (1977); United Kingdom (1980); Germany (1982); South Africa (1983); Costa Rica (1983); New Zealand (1985); Philippines (1986); Paraguay (1987); Australia (1988); India (1992); Poland (1995); Japan (1996); Austria (1999); Ireland (2004); Belgium (2008)
- Founder: Plinio Corrêa de Oliveira; Luiz N. de Assunção Filho; Plinio V. Xavier da Silveira; Caio V. Xavier da Silveira; Eduardo de Barros Brotero; Paulo Corrêa de Brito Filho; Adolpho Lindenberg; José Fernando de Camargo; Celso da Costa C. Vidigal
- Type: Lay civic association
- Purpose: Conservatism; Counter-Revolution; Anti-communism; Traditionalist Catholicism
- Headquarters: Rua Virgílio Rodrigues 44, Tremembé, São Paulo, Brazil
- Main organ: Catolicismo (monthly magazine)
- Website: tfp.org.br IPCO

Tradition, Family, Property (TFP; Portuguese: Tradição, Família, Propriedade) is an international movement of political and civic organizations of traditionalist Catholic inspiration. The organization is classified as far-right. It has been labelled as a cult in France.

The first TFP was founded by radical activist Plinio Corrêa de Oliveira in Brazil in 1960, inspired by his 1959 book Revolution and Counter-Revolution, which became the TFPs' foundational text, later supplemented by his 1993 Nobility and Analogous Traditional Elites in the Allocutions of Pius XII. He remained president of the Brazilian TFP's national council until his death in 1995.

After his death, there was a legal battle upon the title and ownership of the Brazilian TFP, which was ultimately won by João Scognamiglio Clá Dias, in 2004, while he had created previously the Heralds of the Gospel (2001).

Those who opposed this action have remained active in the Association of the Founders of TFP and created the Plinio Corrêa de Oliveira Institute (Portuguese: Instituto Plinio Corrêa de Oliveira), which claims the legacy of the original TFP. They have taken the legal dispute to the Brazilian Supreme Federal Court. In other countries across the world several organizations have continued to use the name and acronym of TFP, or have adopted other names.

== Religion, ideology and structure ==
The movement has been described as a "Catholic right-wing entity". Its worldview has been characterized as an "extreme moralism, against divorce, against Communism, and against change." The TFP movement shares some similarities with twentieth-century fascism, particularly Mussolini's corporate state, but it is more accurately seen as a return to the ideals of eighteenth-century Europe, before the French Revolution. During that period, the Catholic Church endorsed the concept of aristocratic privilege as a divine right. Many Latin American members of the TFP come from wealthy, property-owning backgrounds and have historically provided intellectual and financial support of military coups in the region that were backed by the CIA.

Raúl Matta, in L'Ordinaire Latino-Américaine, pointed out that the group's presentation of Catholic tradition is selective, drawing on speeches and encyclicals from the most conservative popes, including the 1864 Syllabus of Errors. The Italian philosopher Rocco Buttiglione noted that members of the TFP movement were among the signatories of the "Filial Correction" of Pope Francis in 2017. In 2019 Francis named retired Cardinal Raymundo Damasceno Assis of Aparecida as pontifical commissioner of the Heralds of the Gospel and its religious branches for consecrated men and women.

Löwy's study of the interaction of religion and politics in Latin America used the international TFP to exemplify the most conservative of four tendencies within Latin American Catholicism: the one which "defend[s] ultra-reactionary and sometimes semi-fascist ideas." A recent study pointed out that "TFP draws on a rigid interpretation of Christianity to offer the faithful an all-encompassing ideological justification for what are, in essence, very conservative politics." It has been noted that similar religious movements "are benign compared to Tradition, Family and Property (TFP)" which is also "opposed by the Catholic leadership because of its beliefs and recruiting procedures."

Former members and relatives testify that the organization recruits fourteen to sixteen year old boys and subjects them to a brainwashing process, including self-mortification, that is aimed at separating the youth from his family by replacing reverence for his parents with veneration of Plinio and his mother. Some analysts see it as a fringe group within the Latin American Catholic Church, facing denouncements in Venezuela, Brazil, and Chile.

Institutionally, TFPs have been described as having a "chameleon-like identity". When dealing with the Church, they describe themselves as a civic association of the laity, and therefore independent of ecclesiastical control; when dealing with civil society, they stress that they are a voluntary association inspired by religious ideals, and therefore not subject to certain civil regulations such as labor laws.

The TFP participates in medieval rituals and traditions. Members wear scarlet capes and black berets, and they carry medieval banners featuring a lion rampant. Oliveira noted that "the lion elevates the soul to a higher plane; it speaks of battle, evokes a sense of nobility and beauty in the struggle, and conveys a message of valor to all who contemplate it." Young recruits engage in athletic training that includes the use of spears and crossbows, as well as practicing judo and karate. Additionally, members wear cilices, an instrument of self-flagellation.

== International expansion and cooperation ==
TFP is both a national organization and a transnational movement which shares fundamental beliefs, goals, publications, and even funding. Shortly after its foundation in Brazil in 1960, the TFP began a program of international expansion, beginning with a "Latin American Congress of Catholicism" in Serra Negra, Brazil, attended by about 350 Brazilians and about 20 representatives from other countries in Hispanic America. TFP sees this meeting as the beginning of its expansion, with the foundation of TFP offices, national TFPs, and affiliated organizations in 29 countries throughout the world, including Argentina (1967), Chile (1967), Uruguay (1967), Paraguay (1967), Peru (1970), Spain (1971), Bolivia (1973), Colombia (1971), Ecuador (1973), Portugal (1974), the United States (1974), Venezuela (1971), Canada (1975), Italy (1976), France (1977), United Kingdom (1980), Germany (1982), South Africa (1983), Australia (1988), India (1992), Poland (1995), Austria (1999), Ireland (2004), Belgium, Costa Rica, Lithuania, the Philippines, and New Zealand. This expansion produced what is claimed to be "the world's largest anticommunist and antisocialist network of Catholic inspiration."

Although these TFPs described themselves as "autonomous anticommunist organizations inspired by the traditional teachings of the Popes", they cooperated effectively to advance their social and political agenda. A striking example occurred in 1981 when thirteen TFPs (and related organizations) published a six-page critique by Oliveira of François Mitterrand's Socialist government program to implement what was called "self-managing socialism". They were refused space for the essay by six French daily papers but they did publish it in 44 other major newspapers worldwide. The cost of placing each six-page advertisement in The Washington Post or the Toronto-based The Globe and Mail was about $100,000.

=== Argentina ===
The Sociedad Argentina de Defensa de la Tradición, Familia y Propiedad was established in 1967, drawing on a group of conservative Catholics who had previously founded the magazine Cruzada, which opposed liberal Catholicism and socialism. In the late 1960s, the TFP gained the apparent support of the Argentine military regime when they called for a purge of progressive clergy from the Catholic Church. The publications of the Argentinian TFP have been described as embodying a discourse of violence legitimating the authorities' suppression of civil rights. In 1973, the Buenos Aires Provincial Police investigated military training activities conducted by the TFP. Around 1976 or 1977 a certain Father Vicente was forced to flee to Uruguay with the assistance of the Jesuit Provincial, Jorge Bergoglio (later Pope Francis), after having been threatened by the TFP for preaching against the murder of three Pallottine priests and two seminarians.

=== Brazil ===
The Sociedade Brasileira de Defesa da Tradição, Família e Propriedade was founded in 1960 and flourished during conservative opposition to the land reform proposed in Brazil by the government of João Goulart. Goulart's land reform program was criticized by Plinio Corrêa de Oliveira, the economist Luis Mendonça de Freitas, and reactionary bishops Antonio de Castro Mayer and Geraldo de Proença Sigaud in their 1961 book, Agrarian Reform—A Question of Conscience, which treated private property as a moral absolute. The Brazilian TFP's campaign against what it termed "socialist and confiscatory land reform" provided the incentives leading to the military coup of 1964 as well as later repressive legislation. In 1968 the Brazilian TFP gathered two million signatures in a continent-wide petition campaign against Communist infiltration of the Catholic Church, which placed it in clear opposition to the mainstream Brazilian hierarchy. TFP also urged the military government to arrest Hélder Câmara, Archbishop of Olinda e Recife, for his support of land reform. In 1969, Câmara linked the TFP indirectly to the murder in Recife of his aide, Father Antônio Henrique Pereira Neto.

These actions, as well as TFP's opposition to liberation theology, led to a string of criticism beginning in 1970 from a number of bishops, including the National Conference of Bishops of Brazil, which saw the TFP as destroying ecclesiastical unity. Notably, at their 23rd general assembly in 1985 the Brazilian Bishops criticized TFP for its "lack of communion … with the Church in Brazil, its hierarchy, and the Holy Father" and for its "esoteric character, the religious fanaticism, and the cult given to the personality of its leader and his mother." The Brazilian TFP replied the next day that "justice forbids TFP from accepting as valid vague and generic accusations like those in the NCBB text. Specific facts and proofs must be presented." The American TFP attributed the bishops' critique to "the tragic influence of Marxist liberation theology among Brazilian bishops".

The Brazilian TFP split into two factions after the death of its founder in 1995 and a dispute over the rights to the society's name and assets has been progressing through the Brazilian courts. As of 2013 the final decision was waiting on action of the Supreme Court. After an unfavorable court decision in 2004 the remaining, politically active faction formed the Association of Founders of TFP to continue the original expression of their social ideals and to contest the court case. Since this split, the Association of Founders has received substantial financial support from the American TFP. Subsequently, the Association of Founders of TFP formed a new organization, the Instituto Plinio Corrêa de Oliveira, which carried out much the same program as the original TFP. The Institute's web page provides links to many national TFPs on its list of affiliated organizations and it, along with its periodical Catolicismo, are the two Brazilian organizations listed as an "Inspired and Related Group" on the US TFP's web page. The official website of the original Brazilian Society for Defense of Tradition, Family and Property still remains active and promotes their magazine, named Dr. Plinio, despite the restrictions imposed on them.

=== Chile ===
In 1967 a group of conservative Catholics who published the magazine Fiducia, decided to form a Chilean chapter of the TFP. In the late 1960s the TFP circulated a book claiming President Eduardo Frei Montalva, was the Chilean Kerensky. The book was written in Portuguese by Fabio Vidigal Xavier da Silveira, a director of the Brazilian TFP, translated into Spanish by the Argentine affiliate of the TFP, and distributed in Chile and throughout South America. Vidigal argued that the Christian Democratic party was a tool of the communist plan to socialize Latin America. His book was repeatedly confiscated and the TFP was banned by Frei's Christian Democratic government. They opposed the government of Salvador Allende and welcomed the United States-sponsored 1973 military coup that overthrew his Popular Unity government.

In 1976, during the Pinochet dictatorship, the TFP published a book maintaining that Catholics are duty bound to resist pastors and clergy who support the hierarchy, especially the defender of human rights Cardinal Raúl Silva Henríquez, who they said was leading the country toward Communism. The Chilean TFP can be seen as advocating violence against the "enemies of the truth", especially those who were seen as tolerating the infiltration of communism. By March, the Chilean Bishops' Conference responded with a formal rebuke of the TFP, maintaining that the bishops have the sole governing responsibility in the Church and that those who participated in this campaign have "by their actions placed themselves outside the Catholic Church". Nonetheless, the TFP continued to have strong influence among the conservative political, military, and economic leadership of Chile, many of whom were present at a 1992 anniversary celebration of the founding of TFP.

=== France ===
The Société française pour la défense de la Tradition, Famille, Propriété grew out of an office established in 1974 by four Latin American members of TFP to disseminate information regarding TFP in Europe. French associates established the Jeunes Français pour une Civilisation Chrétienne in 1975, which took its present name in January 1977. Its statutes set the goals of defending the fundamental principles of Christian Civilization and opposing the principles of liberal and egalitarian revolution and the communism and socialism which that revolution engendered. With its foundation it established a school, l'École Saint-Benoït, which was closed after two years amid accusations that it was being used as a center of indoctrination and recruitment.

The society was described as one of the most active of the pseudo-Catholic organizations by the National Assembly's Commission of Inquiry into Cults. The Commission defined as "pseudo-Catholic" those organizations that appeal to the Catholic tradition which they maintain against the reforms imposed by Rome. TFP was also seen to exemplify a mastery of commercial fund-raising techniques, with a network of closely related organizations targeting messages to susceptible recipients.

Many critics also come from Catholic circles: in 2006, the Journal chrétien recalled that "the main grievances against the TFP are intellectual swindle, indoctrination, destruction of the followers' personality which are separated from family, cult of the founder, systematic and destructive criticism of all that exists, also about finances". An association fighting sects in the Catholic Church, L'envers du décor, considers the TFP a cult and accuses it of hiding the past of its leaders as well as the "worship of the founder's personality, mental manipulation, recruitment of young people and other questionable activities that make it look like many modern cults".

=== Ireland ===
The Irish Society for Christian Civilisation describes itself as being "part of the TFP network". The group regularly hosts summer camps for boys as well as protests against gay rights and legalized abortion.

=== Poland ===
TFP co-operates with the Polish think tank Ordo Iuris and the Christian Culture Association. Ordo luris has backed policy efforts such as the 2016 bill to ban abortion and the "Stop Paedophilia" law, which criminalizes sexuality education and permits LGBT-free zones.

=== South Africa ===
The Young South Africans for a Christian Civilisation (TFP) was founded in 1984, during the declining years of the Apartheid regime, to resist "the liberal, socialist and communist trends of the times" and to provide theological support for the idea of a natural inequality in society. Early targets of the TFP's expansion into South Africa were Catholic, Portuguese-speaking refugees from newly independent Mozambique. One of its activities was to oppose the newspaper, New Nation, which had been funded by the Southern African Catholic Bishops Conference, advanced liberation theology, and opposed apartheid but which the TFP saw as "communist inspired". The TFP sought to undermine the bishops' popular support and appealed, unsuccessfully, to the Pope that he ban the paper. The TFP's efforts were more successful in providing justification for the government's three-month suspension of the newspaper in 1987. State President P. W. Botha and an unnamed government minister wrote the TFP, commending them for supporting the goals of the National Party government. The South African bishops issued a strongly worded rebuttal of the accusation that New Nation was a "communist" newspaper and noted that the TFP's critiques ignored the gospel basis of liberation theology.

The TFP maintains that they supported the bishops’ 1952 statement opposing Apartheid. They also oppose the excesses of laissez-faire capitalism, but more so the radically liberal and socialist egalitarianism found in Communism which the Catholic Church defines as "intrinsically wrong". The TFP favors natural and harmonious inequalities in an organic society.

=== United States ===
The American Society for the Defense of Tradition, Family and Property was founded in the United States in 1973, stemming from a group who in 1971 had founded a magazine, Crusade for a Christian Civilization. This drew from earlier encounters of members of the Brazilian TFP with followers of the American New Right. The American TFP is staffed by 75 full-time volunteers and 100 employees. Its national headquarters is in Spring Grove, Pennsylvania, with branch offices in McLean, Virginia, Park Ridge, Illinois, Milwaukee, Wisconsin, Hazleton and Freeland, Pennsylvania, Rossville, Kansas, Orange and San Jose, California, Honolulu, Hawaii, Clermont and Hollywood, Florida, with other centers in Houston and Arlington, Texas, and New Orleans, Louisiana. Its major campaign is America Needs Fatima.

==== Louisiana ====
Thomas Drake is the director of TFP-Louisiana and resides at the TFP center in Lafayette, Louisiana.

In 1999, TFP-Louisiana representatives escorted Prince Bertrand Orleans-Baraganza, a claimant to the defunct Brazilian throne, to the Museum of the Acadian Memorial and St. Martin de Tours Catholic Church in St. Martinville, Louisiana.

St. Peter Catholic Church in Gueydan, St. Joseph Catholic Church, and Our Mother of Mercy Catholic Church in Rayne, all organized public rosary rallies co-sponsored by the TFP.

TFP-Louisiana protested a drag queen story hour at the Lafayette Public Library, and participants included Stephanie Armbruster, who later became a library board member. She advocated for banning certain books and a documentary while also seeking to restrict minors' access to materials she considered sexual in nature.

=== Venezuela ===
In December 1984, Caracas police arrested a man for questioning regarding a possible plot to assassinate Pope John Paul II. Police discovered a .22-caliber rifle with a telescopic sight and documents detailing the pope's planned itinerary in the man's car. Authorities indicated that the suspect also possessed a membership card for Tradition, Family and Property, which had reportedly been under investigation for a potential plot against the pope several months earlier. The TFP denied any involvement.

The government of President Jaime Lusinchi intended to formally announce a ban on the TFP after a three-month investigation revealed that it was operating outside the Constitution. The investigation was prompted by several parents' complaints that the group had brainwashed their teenage children and alienated them from their families.
