= IPCO =

IPCO may refer to:

- Plinio Corrêa de Oliveira Institute
- Information and Privacy Commissioner of Ontario
- Investigatory Powers Commissioner's Office
- Invitation to Present Commercial Opportunities
- Iran Khodro Power Train Co.
