= Basilica of Our Lady of the Rosary, Caieiras =

Basilica of Our Lady of the Rosary
- Basílica de Nossa Senhora do Rosário
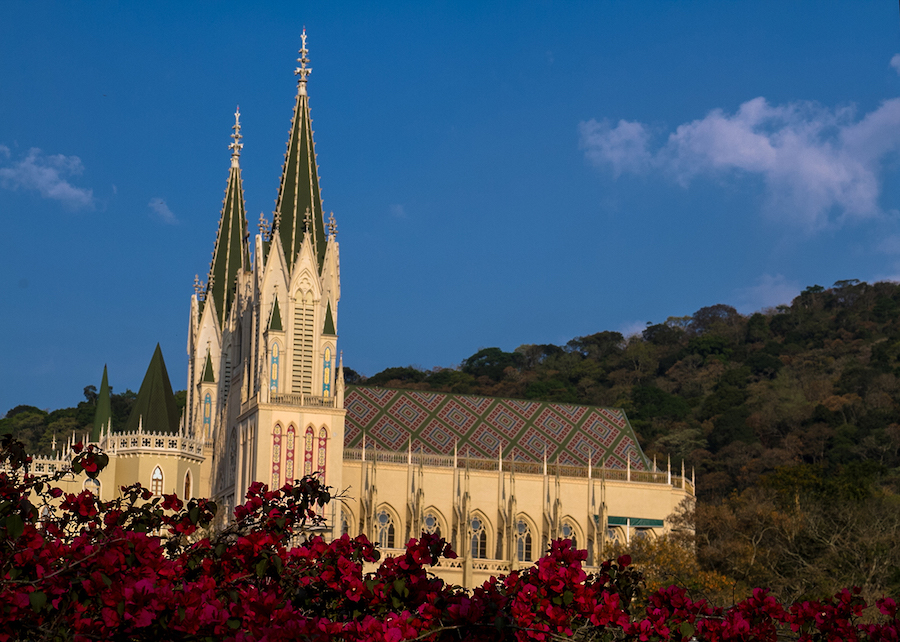
- Basilica of Our Lady of the Rosary
- 23°24′32″S 46°40′14″W
- Location: Caieiras
- Country: Brazil
- Denomination: Roman Catholic Church

The Basilica of Our Lady of the Rosary (Portuguese: Basílica de Nossa Senhora do Rosário), also known as Basilica of Caieiras, is a Roman Catholic basilica affiliated to the Heralds of the Gospel, in Caieiras, in the State of São Paulo, in the southeast region of Brazil.

== History ==
The Basilica of Our Lady of the Rosary began in October 2006, inspired by the Gothic style of the great medieval European cathedrals such as Notre-Dame de Paris and Saint Chapelle in the same city.

The solemn dedication was celebrated on February 24, 2008, presided over by Cardinal Franc Rodé, CM, then prefect of the Congregation for Institutes of Consecrated Life and Societies of Apostolic Life.

On October 18, 2009, it rose to the status of a parish church, responding to requests from the faithful of the region.

Finally, on April 21, 2012, Pope Benedict XVI declared it a minor basilica.

It is a place noted for solemn ceremonies, beautiful Gregorian Chant and Sacred polyphony.

== See also ==
- Roman Catholicism in Brazil
- Our Lady of the Rosary
- Basilica Our Lady of the Rosary
