= Purgatorial society =

Purgatorial societies are Roman Catholic Church associations or confraternities which aim to assist souls in purgatory reach heaven. The doctrine concerning purgatory (the term for the intermediate state in Roman Catholicism), the condition of the poor souls after death (particular judgment), the communion of saints, and the satisfactory value of our good works form the basis of these associations.

In the present day, many purgatorial societies exist, such as the Purgatorian Archconfraternity, which is run by the monks in the religious order of Transalpine Redemptorists; the Central Ohio Purgatorial Society, a lay apostolate; Saint Gertrude Purgatorian Society, which is based in the United States; the Guild of All Souls, which is a traditionalist Catholic purgatorial society under the auspices of the Guild of St. Peter ad Vincula; and the Holy Souls Registry, that is run by America Needs Fatima.

== History ==
For centuries, associations praying for the purgatorial souls were common. The old religious orders, e.g. the Benedictine Order, especially the Order of Cluny which inaugurated All Souls' Day, also met some of this need. Religious confraternities are likewise distinguished in their early beginnings by a special devotion to the sick and burial of the deceased (e.g. the brotherhood of Constantinople which flourished in 336, and in the West the Confratriæ or Confraternitates of the Middle Ages). Even medieval guilds, established primarily for secular purposes, included in their constitutions to require charity for deceased members.

=== The early associations ===
In Northern Europe, the medieval associations of prayer called "fraternitates", "societates", and "consortium" are not as well known, although some "Totenbünde" (German for associations for the dead) existed, affording one of the best proofs of the existence of lively faith, especially among the Anglo-Saxons, Franks and the Germanic peoples in general. They were founded chiefly, though not solely, to assist deceased members with prayers, Mass and works of Christian charity.

Ducange-Favre defines a Confraternitas "as ... a society formed between various churches and monasteries, abbeys, bishops and noblemen; later kings, princes, bishops, priests and the laity, especially ecclesiastical benefactors, were admitted". The admission papers or the constitutions of the brotherhood usually stated in detail how many Masses, what prayers, and good works would be offered on their death for the repose of the souls of deceased members, in the place of worship or by individuals. The members were enrolled in a registry (a Liber Vitæ or 'book of life'), a development of the ancient diptychs. Upon the death of a member, a messenger was immediately dispatched with a circular (rotulus) to announce the death to all the affiliated monasteries, where the name was inserted in list of the dead. These lists of the dead were also known as necrologies for constant commemoration; these lists were, like the earlier diptychs, read aloud so that special prayers might be said for the deceased mentioned, and a special commemoration made by the priest during the Eucharist.

=== The zenith period ===
In the West, these confraternities attained their greatest prosperity during the era from Carolingian reigns till the end of feudalism. In c. 1400 England, Wyclif issued the first public opposition to these associations. These brotherhoods may be divided into those formed of several monasteries or churches, or individual bishops, priests, abbots and monks. However, kings, princes and other laymen, especially benefactors, were admitted into these three classes, and even the frequently very numerous subordinates of a monastery.

Especially during their peak, confraternities were formed among monasteries. In the 9th century, Reichenau was affiliated with more than a hundred other monasteries and chapters in Germany, Switzerland, France and Italy. This affiliation was chiefly due to the reform of the monastery by St. Benedict of Aniane, and is the largest brotherhood known to us. Alcuin worked in the west of the Frankish Empire, and before him St. Boniface had sought with eager zeal to establish and foster in Germany such unions and brotherhoods with England and Italy. Similarly an "Act of Spiritual Association" between the Abbeys of St. Denis of France and St. Remy of Reims arranged that, within thirty days after the death of a member, the entire Office be recited by each of the surviving members, that the priests say Masses corresponding to the various offices, and that vigils be held in common on the first, seventh, and thirteenth days. At mediaeval synods, the bishops and abbots present frequently formed themselves into such brotherhoods, often extending to the cathedral chapters and monasteries, and to the kings and princes who were present at the councils – in the 8th and 9th centuries, a series of such synods took place: Attigny (762); Dingolfing (769); Frankfort (794); Salzburg (799); Freising (805); Clechyt 815; Savionières near Toul (850). Brotherhoods were also formed at other English and Italian synods. At diocesan synods all the clergy of a diocese with their bishop formed themselves into brotherhoods, and frequently priests of still smaller districts (rural chapters) formed lesser associations of prayer to which the laity were also admitted. Individuals of every station, rank, and sex eagerly joined these associations, while numerous rich persons funded monasteries to insure a special share in their suffrage after death. English kings, bishops, abbots and Carolingian kings gave them an excellent example, as did St. Boniface and Alcuin. Even the laity of the lower classes joined the brotherhoods of St. Gall and Reichenau. The communion of spiritual goods and indulgences, granted by monasteries in the last centuries to another monastery, to benefactors and friends outside the cloister, or to other confraternities, is more than a memorial of the old brotherhoods, since in these grants (communicationes) the promise of spiritual help for the deceased is one of the chief features.

=== The evolution of modern associations ===
Along with these brotherhoods, there appeared Confraternitaties more closely resembling the present associations. Their chief object was care for the poor souls. Among these might be included the associations devoting themselves to the spiritual welfare of the dying and their burial. Of the confraternities of the dead, only examples can be cited from the earlier centuries, but these show sufficiently clearly how widespread these must then have been. According to an inscription in the Church of Ss. Cosmas & Damian in Rome a number of priests and bishops in Rome formed themselves into an association of sodales (c. 985), each promising that on the death of a member he would immediately sing forty Masses for the repose of his soul.

==== The 11th to 15th centuries ====
At the beginning of the 11th century, the friends of Knut the Great erected in his honour a confraternity at Abbotsbury, according to the statutes of which each member should on the death of another contribute a penny for the repose of his soul. In 1220 Peter, Bishop of Sens ratified a confraternity formed by thirteen clergy who bound themselves to celebrate annually four anniversaries for the benefactors and members. In 1262 twenty-four secular priests united to practice works of mercy for the dead, read Masses for the repose of their souls, et cetera. In 1355 at Glocknitz a lay confraternity for the dead accepted members from other parishes and cared especially for the burial of the poor. Ducange-Favre speaks of a pious association, founded in 1413, expressly under the name of purgatory, in the old church of Maria Deaurata at Toulouse.

These confraternities concerned themselves almost exclusively with the souls of deceased members and benefactors, while later associations worked for the benefit of all souls. Provision for burial was first made by the 15th century Compagnia della Pietà (founded in Rome in 1448). In the newly erected church of the German cemetery, a confraternity "in honour of the bitter Passion of Christ and of the Sorrowful Mother, to comfort and assist all the faithful souls", was erected (1448) by the penitentiary, Johannes Goldener of Nuremberg, later titular Bishop of Accon and auxiliary bishop of Bamberg. This confraternity was, in 1579, then raised by Gregory XIII to an archconfraternity, enriched with new indulgences, and empowered to aggregate other confraternities throughout the world. Although it has undergone many changes, this confraternity still exists, joining at the end of the 19th century with a special Requiem Mass Association for assisting souls of deceased members, and it is the first purgatorial society according to the present meaning of the name.

==== The 15th to the 18th century ====
Founded in 1488, the Black Penitents, who marched in procession through Rome under the gonfalone of mercy, aimed to assist, before execution, those condemned to death, and afterwards to provide for their burial, exequies, and Requiem Mass. The Confraternity of Our Lady of Suffrage (Santa Maria del Suffragio) existed in Rome from 1592, expressly for the relief of poor souls. It has numerous members, and since 1615 has added other confraternities with the same object. The Archconfraternity of Death and Prayer (mortis et orationis), founded at Santa Maria dell’Orazione e Morte in Rome in 1538, to provide for the burial of the poor and abandoned, still exists.

About 1687 the rules for a special confraternity "for the relief of the Most Needy Souls in Purgatory" were approved in Rome under the sacred names of Jesus, Mary and Joseph. The confraternity of Jesus Christ on Mount Calvary and the Sorrowful Mother sponsored processions of the Way of the Cross in the Roman Colosseum and enjoyed special popularity, having been inaugurated September 8, 1760, and having St. Leonard of Port Mauric among its illustrious members.

In 1726, local Franciscans formed the Ingolstadt Mass Association, that aimed to procure for all members the grace of a happy death and for those already deceased speedy assistance and liberation from the pains of purgatory. In 1874, it became a formal confraternity under the title of the Immaculate Conception. A highly venerated painting of the Virgin was adopted as the titular picture, and it received all the indulgences of the confraternity of the same name in Ara Coeli at Rome (these being the indulgences of the Blue Scapular). By the early 20th century it had tens of thousands of members; almost 2000 Masses were daily celebrated for the intentions of the Marian Mass Association, which aimed to particularly assist the most recently deceased members; however in the later parts of the 20th century this confraternity has faded into obscurity.

==== 19th and 20th centuries ====
At the close of the Middle Ages, the old confraternities which were generally confined to a town or small district gradually disappeared or preserved only a semblance of continuation. By the 19th century they were replaced by vigorous new associations, which, richly endowed with indulgences by ecclesiastical authorities, rapidly extended to the entire Church. In 1818, Pius VII endowed the Archconfraternity of Our Mother of Sorrows and the Poor Souls in Purgatory, housed in Santa Maria in Trastevere, with rich indulgences.

The largest of the later confraternities is the Archconfraternity for the Relief of the Poor Souls in Purgatory under the title of the Assumption of Mary (founded 1841) in the Redemptorist church of Santa Maria in Monterone at Rome. It expanded rapidly to England and North America, and was endowed with indulgences in 1841–63. Priests empowered to receive the faithful into the confraternity enjoy various other faculties. This confraternity is especially adapted for rapid expansion, because in 1860 it was authorized to aggregate every confraternity of whatever name and object and to communicate to them its graces and privileges, provided they added to their original titles "and for the relief of the Poor Souls in Purgatory"; they must not, however, be already aggregated to another archconfraternity, nor have been endowed with indulgences on their own account. The Redemptorist Fathers still conduct this archconfraternity which is now known as the "Purgatorian Archconfraternity".

At Nîmes, a confraternity similar to that of Our Lady of Suffrage was established in 1857, received the faculty of aggregating other confraternities in the Diocese in 1858, and in 1873 received the same right for the world. In addition to the indulgences of the Roman confraternity, that of Nîmes has received others: the recital of the Rosary of the Dead was approved especially for its members by Pius IX in 1873. In accordance with its ancient traditions, the Benedictine order formed a twofold Confraternity of the Poor Souls at Lambach, Austria. In 1877 the Archconfraternity of the Perpetual Adoration of the Blessed Sacrament under the protection of St. Benedict for the Poor Souls in Purgatory was erected with the right to aggregate other confraternities of the same name and object in Austrohungaria. In 1893, this confraternity was erected in the abbey church of St. John the Baptist in Collegeville, Minnesota; it shares in all the indulgences of the Lambach confraternity, and possesses, as the archconfraternity of North America, the faculty of aggregating all confraternities of the same name and communicating to them its indulgences. Finally, by 1910, Pius X granted to Lambach Confraternity the right to aggregation for the whole world. There was also founded, in 1878, in the same abbey church of Lambach, a Priest's Association under the Protection of St. Benedict for the Relief of the Poor Souls in Purgatory. This was approved and recommended by the diocesan bishop, Franz Joseph Rudigier. Many other bishops, especially in North America, recommended it to their clergy. The direction of the association was placed in the hands of the general director of the Archconfraternity of Lambach, who entered the members in a special register. The official organ for both was the "Benediktusstimmen" published by the Abbey of Emaus in Prague.

A work of atonement to obtain liberation for the most needy and abandoned souls in purgatory by the celebration of many Masses was founded in 1884 in the parish of La Chapelle-Montligeon, France. Until 1893 this association was joined to the archconfraternity of S. Maria in Monterone, but by 1893 became an honorary archconfraternity and prima-primaria. This association had many millions of members and was blessed by the pope. To become a member, one must have one's name enrolled and contribute five centimes annually for the objects of the association; persons who make a single contribution of 5 francs had a permanent share in all the Masses celebrated for the deceased. Seven Masses are said weekly for the souls in purgatory, three monthly for deceased priests, and in addition many thousand Masses are offered annually.

The Order of Cluny have always been conspicuous for their devotion to the poor souls. Since 998, St. Odilio, Abbott of Cluny, had All Soul's Day celebrated by his monks on 2 November, which day was gradually devoted by the entire church to the relief of the poor souls. In memory of this fact, a new archconfraternity was erected at Cluny in the parish of Our Lady. By Brief of 25 May 1898, Leo XIII granted this "Archconfraternity of Prayer for the Poor Souls in Purgatory" the indulgences of the old Roman Confraternity of Prayer and Death (see above), and authorized it to aggregate similar confraternities throughout France and its colonies. The "Associazione del Scaro Cuore di Gesû in suffrago della Anime del Pugatorio" was canonically established in Rome (Lungotevere, Prati), in a church of the Sacred Heart, and granted indulgences and privileges by Leo XIII (1903-5). The director of this association, which includes non-residents of Rome in its membership, edits "Rivista mensile dell' Associazione".

Indulgences of the confraternities are ever applicable to the souls in purgatory, and the privileges of the altar for churches and for priests, who are members, may be used in favour of dead members or for all poor souls. The formation of the "Catholic League for Constant Intercession for the Poor Souls in Purgatory" was proposed by certain pious citizens of Rome, approved by Leo XIII in the last years of his reign, and enriched with indulgences. The only requisite for membership is to recite thrice daily the prayer, "Requiem æternam dona eis Domine et lux perpetua luceat eis. Requiescant in pace. Amen", thereby gaining once daily an indulgence of 200 days.

==== Present day ====
The Transalpine Redemptorists of Golgotha Monastery in Scotland run the Archconfraternity for the Relief of the Poor Souls in Purgatory. The monks at Papa Stronsay offer the Holy Mass every day for living and deceased members of the Archconfraternity for the Relief of the Poor Souls in Purgatory; members are encouraged to unite themselves spiritually when the Holy Mass is offered (10:45 pm ET on weekdays and 1:45 pm ET on the Lord's Day). They pray the rosary every Monday in the Chapel of the Holy Face of Jesus for dead members of the Purgatorian Archconfraternity.

Members of the Central Ohio Purgatorial Society, a lay apostolate, pray a First Tuesday Devotion every month after Black Fasting until sunset around 7 pm. The First Tuesday devotion involves doing a Black Fast on that day, attending the Holy Mass and offering it for the faithful departed, as well as praying the Chaplet for the Dead (if one is unable to attend the Holy Mass, he/she must make a Spiritual Communion). These acts are also performed on All Soul's Day, along with praying five decades of the Sorrowful Mysteries with the intention of the Holy Souls while at a graveyard.

The Saint Gertrude Purgatorian Society was established to "pray daily for the Poor Souls in Purgatory, practice almsgiving, and make sacrifices, all for the benefit of the suffering souls." On 23 May 2014, it received an episcopal blessing from William P. Callahan, then the bishop of the Roman Catholic Diocese of La Crosse.

The Holy Souls Registry allows for the enrollment of faithful departed Christians who are prayed for throughout the year by members of America Needs Fatima.

The Guild of All Souls is a traditional Catholic confraternity that offers daily prayers for the faithful departed; loved ones of members are added to the Guild of All Souls' Bead List. Those on the Bead List are remembered at the celebration of the Holy Mass, which is offered monthly for them.

The Friends of the Sufferings Souls (FOSS) is a lay Catholic Association founded in the 1980s in Australia. Its members are now found all over the world with larger numbers in Australia, Ireland, United States and South Africa. Collectively members arrange more than 50,000 Masses each year for the Holy Souls in Purgatory.

The Holy Souls Apostolate (HSA) is a lay association of the faithful solely dedicated to praying for the holy souls in purgatory. Members pray a rosary daily as well as retain a prayer book that allows them to enter the names and dates of deceased people to pray for on the anniversary of that person's death. Informally known as 'Purgatorians,' the Association's home is within the Diocese of Lincoln, Nebraska.

== See also ==
- Guild of All Souls (Anglican)
