= Civitas Christiana =

Dutch non-profit activist organization

Civitas Christiana is an Catholic socially conservative Dutch non-profit activist organization. Through online petitions, mailing, books, and street activism it works to defend the traditional Christian understanding of the family and opposes abortion, LGBT rights, pedophilia, feminism, environmentalism, multiculturalism, Islam, and mass immigration.

Founded in 2014 by Hugo Bos, Civitas Christiana is a member of the international network of Societies for the Defense of Tradition, Family, and Property.
