= Adolpho Lindenberg =

Brazilian writer and architect (1924–2024)

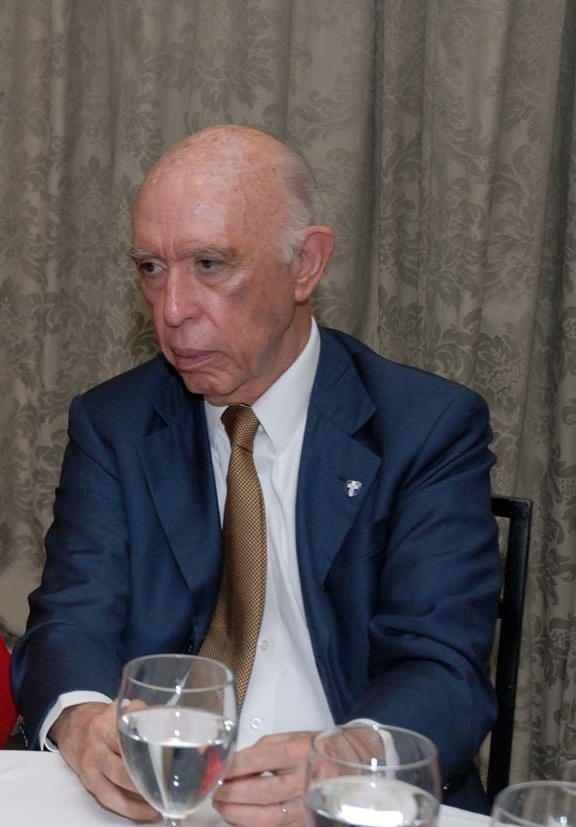
- Adolpho Lindenberg
- Born: 3 June 1924; São Paulo, Brazil
- Died: 2 May 2024 (aged 99); São Paulo, Brazil
- Education: Mackenzie Presbyterian University
- Occupations: Civil engineer, architect, writer, political activist
- Organizations: Tradition, Family and Property; Plinio Corrêa de Oliveira Institute
- Known for: Founder of Construtora Adolpho Lindenberg (CAL); President of the Plinio Corrêa de Oliveira Institute
- Notable work: Reintroduction of colonial and neoclassical styles in Brazilian architecture

Adolpho Lindenberg (3 June 1924 – 2 May 2024) was a Brazilian civil engineer, architect, writer and political activist. A cousin and disciple of Plinio Corrêa de Oliveira, the founder of Tradition, Family, Property, he was the president of the Plinio Corrêa de Oliveira Institute, from its creation in 2006 until his death, in 2024.

== Early life and professional career ==
Grandson of engineer Ludwig Linderberg, a German immigrant who settled in Brazil in 1818 and son of Eponina Ribeiro dos Santos, from a traditional family of the 15th century, and of Adolpho Carlos, a doctor and the first full professor of dermatology at the Faculty of Medicine of São Paulo, Adolpho Lindenberg was born in São Paulo on 3 June 1924. He graduated in Civil Engineering and Architecture at the Mackenzie Presbyterian University, in 1949. He started his own enterprise, the Adolpho Lindenberg Construction Company (Portuguese: Construtora Adolpho Lindenberg) or CAL, in 1952, which became, in a short time, one of the most admired in Brazil. The CAL name is associated with the reintroduction of the colonial style in Brazilian contemporary architecture. His style left a mark in many buildings of São Paulo. Since the 1950s, he created many buildings in the colonial style, because he believed it to be more suitable to Brazilian climate and culture than the Bauhaus style. From the 1960s to the 1980s, he authored many buildings in neoclassical or mediterranean style, with great success in the real estate market, to the point that about 60% of the luxury buildings in São Paulo from that time follow this style. His neoclassical style was named "Lindenberg style".

== Activist career ==
Lindenberg was a longtime member of Tradition, Family and Property, being a collaborator of their newspaper, O Legionário, and later an editor of the current magazine, Catolicismo. After the division and legal dispute that followed Plinio Corrêa de Oliveira's death, in 1995, he was a member of the Association of the Founders of TFP. After their judicial loss in 2004, they went to create the Plinio Corrêa de Oliveira Institute, in 2006, of which he was the president from then on. He identified with the Catholic Traditionalists and has been linked to the far-right movement in Brazil.

== Death ==
Lindenberg died in São Paulo on 2 May 2024, at the age of 99, 32 days before his 100th birthday.
