= Fernando Penteado =

Brazilian Roman Catholic bishop (born 1934)

The Most Reverend Fernando José Penteado
- Bishop Emeritus of Jacarezinho
- Church: Roman Catholic Church
- Diocese: Jacarezinho
- Appointed: 5 July 2000
- Installed: 16 July 2000
- Term ended: 23 June 2010
- Predecessor: Conrado Walter
- Successor: Antônio Braz Benevente

Orders
- Ordination: 8 December 1960 by Carlos Carmelo de Vasconcellos Motta
- Consecration: 27 May 1979 by Pope John Paul II

Personal details
- Born: 7 July 1934 (age 92) São Paulo, Brazil
- Education: Imaculada Conceição Major Seminary
- Motto: Emitte lucem tuam

Fernando José Penteado (born 7 July 1934) is a Brazilian Roman Catholic prelate who served as the Bishop of Jacarezinho from 2000 until his retirement in 2010. Previously, he served as an auxiliary bishop of the Archdiocese of São Paulo from 1979. Following his retirement, he continued his pastoral activities in São Paulo. He also served as rector pro tempore of the State University of Northern Paraná (UENP) between 2006 and 2010.

== Early life and education ==
Fernando José Penteado was born on 7 July 1934 in São Paulo, Brazil, to Maria José Reves and José Siqueira Penteado. He entered the preparatory seminary in São Paulo in 1947 and subsequently studied philosophy and theology at the Imaculada Conceição Major Seminary in Ipiranga, part of the Archdiocese of São Paulo.

== Priesthood ==
Penteado was ordained a priest on 8 December 1960 at the Cathedral of the Sé in São Paulo by Cardinal Carlos Carmelo de Vasconcellos Motta, then Archbishop of São Paulo.

Following his ordination, he served as a professor at the São Roque Minor Seminary and as a parish priest at São Benedito and Nossa Senhora do Rosário in Jabaquara, and at Verbo Divino in Santo Amaro. He also served as episcopal vicar for the Santo Amaro region before the establishment of the Diocese of Santo Amaro.

== Episcopal ministry ==
=== Auxiliary Bishop of São Paulo ===
On 2 April 1979, Penteado was appointed titular bishop of Turres Ammeniae and auxiliary bishop of the Archdiocese of São Paulo. He received episcopal consecration on 27 May 1979 at St. Peter's Basilica in Vatican City, with Pope John Paul II as the principal consecrator.

As an auxiliary bishop, he was initially responsible for the pastoral administration of the Itapecerica da Serra region, where he served until 1989. He subsequently became episcopal vicar for the Lapa region of São Paulo, a position he held until 2000.

=== Bishop of Jacarezinho ===
On 5 July 2000, Pope John Paul II appointed Penteado Bishop of Jacarezinho in the state of Paraná. He succeeded Conrado Walter, whose resignation had been accepted by the pope. At the time of his appointment, Penteado was serving as an auxiliary bishop of São Paulo and titular bishop of Turres Ammeniae. He took possession of the diocese on 16 July 2000.

During his episcopate, Penteado was involved in missionary and pastoral activities throughout the diocese. He also supported the establishment of the State University of Northern Paraná (UENP), subsequently serving as its rector pro tempore from 2006 to 2010.

=== Retirement ===
On 23 June 2010, Pope Benedict XVI accepted Penteado's resignation from the pastoral government of the Diocese of Jacarezinho, in accordance with canon 401 §1 of the Code of Canon Law. He was succeeded by Antônio Braz Benevente, then vicar general of the Archdiocese of Uberaba. Penteado thereby became bishop emeritus of Jacarezinho.

After retiring, he returned to São Paulo, where he resided at the São Domingos Sávio Parish and continued to assist in its pastoral activities. He also participated in the formation of priests, preached spiritual retreats, and remained involved in the activities of the National Conference of Bishops of Brazil (CNBB) and the civil association Gaudium et Spes.

== Later years ==
On 7 July 2024, Penteado celebrated his 90th birthday by presiding over a Mass at São Domingos Sávio Parish in São Paulo. The celebration was attended by clergy and bishops, including Cardinal Odilo Pedro Scherer. During the Mass, Penteado reflected on Christian perseverance, suffering and the importance of recognizing others as brothers and sisters. In an interview published by the Diocese of Campo Limpo on 11 July 2024, he spoke about continuing the Christian journey despite difficulties, emphasizing the importance of faith, hope and trust in God.
