= Santa Maria del Suffragio, Rome =

Santa Maria del Suffragio
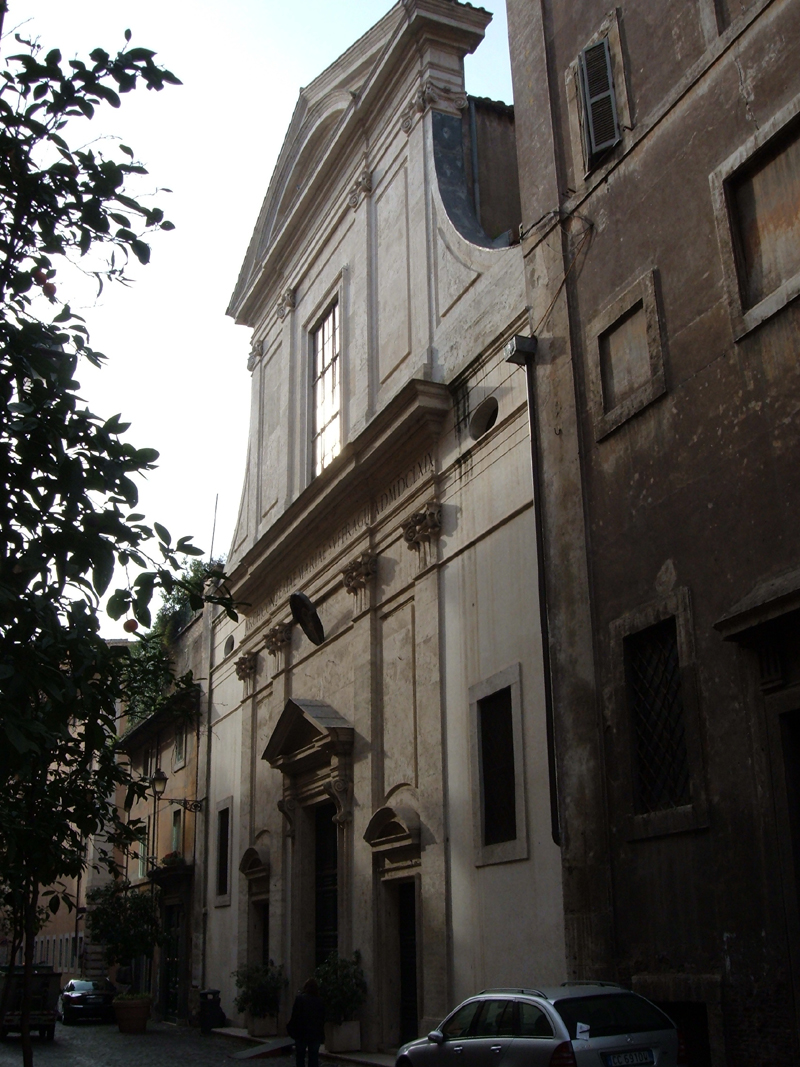
- Facade
- Click on the map for a fullscreen view
- 41°53′52″N 12°27′59″E
- Location: Via Giulia, Rome
- Country: Italy
- Denomination: Roman Catholic

Architecture
- Architect: Carlo Rainaldi
- Architectural type: Church
- Completed: 17th-century

Santa Maria del Suffragio is a 17th-century church in the center Rome, Italy. It lies on the via Giulia, in the rione Ponte.

In 1592, the Confraternita del Suffragio ("Fraternity of those who succor the suffering") was a purgatorial society established adjacent to the church of Saint Biagio della Pagnotta; their goal was to pray for the spirits of the dead and dying. Two years later, the group received a charter of approval from Pope Clement VIII. In 1620, it was elevated to Arciconfraternita by Pope Paul V.

Having outgrown their premises, the group acquired in 1607, part of an unfinished site that originally had been destined to be the Bramante-designed Palace of the Courts. In 1662, the architect Carlo Rainaldi designed the church, which was completed by 1669, with interior decorations continuing till 1685.

The interior has frescoes by Cesare Mariani (Coronation of the Virgin). The third chapel on the right has a Birth of Mary and an Adoration of the Magi by Giuseppe Bartolomeo Chiari. The third chapel on the left once had the Passion of Christ frescoed on the walls by Lanfranco. The frescoes with the Eternal Father in Gloria and the Assumption in the choir are by Giovanni Battista Beinaschi.

== See also ==
- Santa Maria dell’Orazione e Morte

== Sources ==
- Romecity entry
