= Geraldo de Proença Sigaud =

Brazilian Catholic archbishop (1909–1999)

The Most Reverend Geraldo de Proença Sigaud S.V.D.
- Archbishop of Diamantina
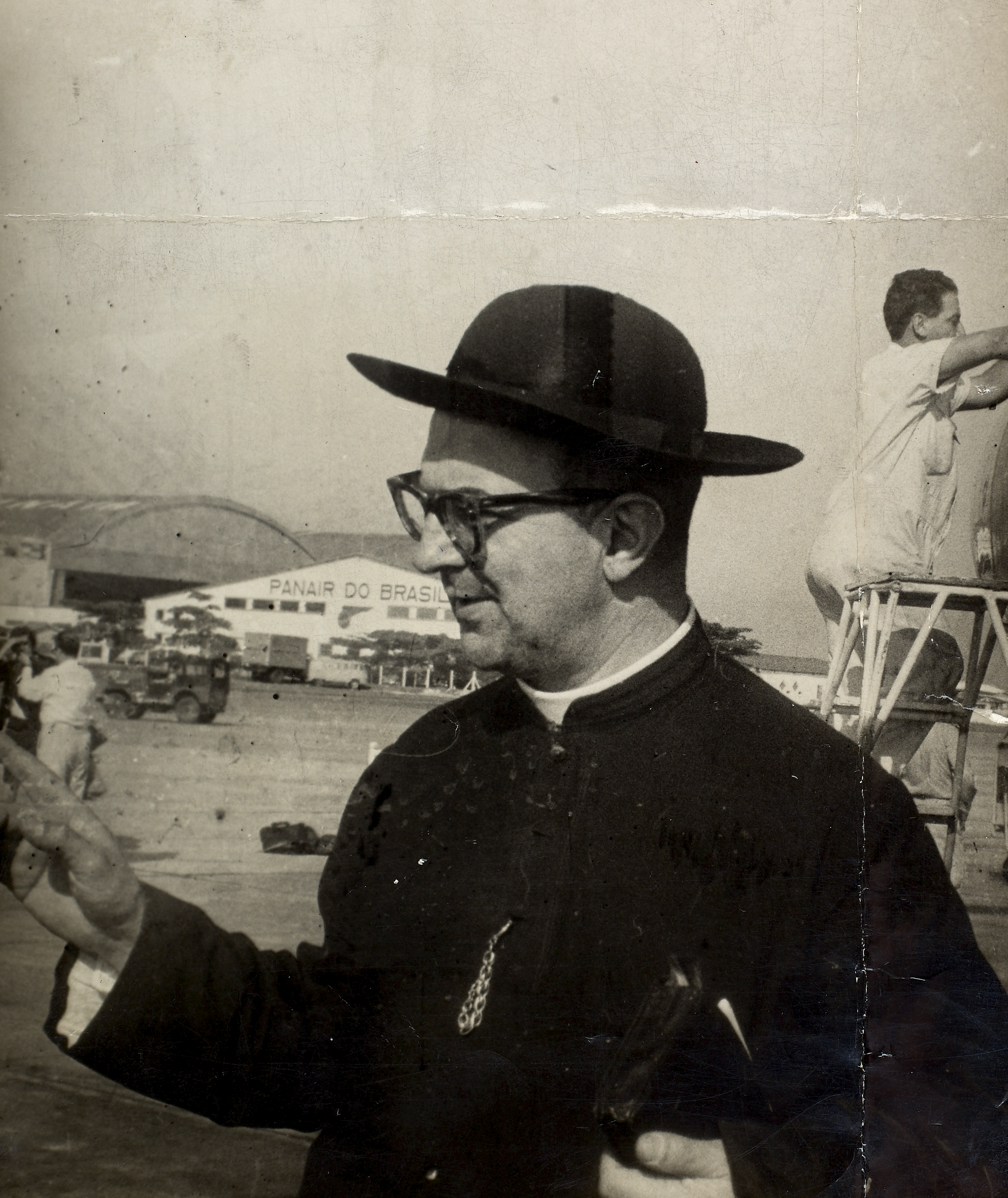
- See: Diamantina
- Installed: December 20, 1960
- Term ended: September 10, 1980
- Predecessor: Jose Newton de Almeida Baptista
- Successor: Geraldo Majela Reis
- Other post: Bishop of Jacarezinho (1947-1960)

Orders
- Ordination: March 12, 1932
- Consecration: May 1, 1947

Personal details
- Born: 26 September 1909 Belo Horizonte, Minas Gerais
- Died: 5 September 1999 (aged 89) Diamantina, Minas Gerais

Geraldo de Proença Sigaud, S.V.D. (September 26, 1909 – September 5, 1999) was a Brazilian prelate of the Roman Catholic Church. He served as Bishop of Jacarezinho from 1947 to 1960, and as Archbishop of Diamantina from 1960 to 1980.

== Biography ==
He was born in Belo Horizonte, Minas Gerais, and ordained a priest of the Society of the Divine Word on March 12, 1932. Following his ordination, he became a professor at the major seminary of São Paulo, alongside Antônio de Castro Mayer. When he gave his support to a book written by Plinio Corrêa de Oliveira claiming Communist infiltration in the Brazilian Catholic Action, he was sanctioned and sent to Spain in March 1946. However, he found favor with the Apostolic Nuncio Benedetto Aloisi Masella, who ensured his return to Brazil shortly afterwards.

On October 29, 1946, Sigaud was appointed the third Bishop of Jacarezinho by Pope Pius XII. He received his episcopal consecration on May 1, 1947 from Archbishop Carlo Chiarlo, with Bishops José Maurício da Rocha and Manoel da Silveira d'Elboux serving as co-consecrators. He was later named the fourth Archbishop of Diamantina on December 20, 1960.

In 1959 Pope John XXIII decided to call the Second Vatican Council. During the preparations for the Council, Sigaud wrote to Domenico Tardini, the Papal Secretary of State, describing the United States one-dollar bill as evidence of a world wide conspiracy of Freemasons and Jews "against the Catholic order," and claimed, "The heads of international Jewry have for centuries conspired methodically and out of an undying hatred against the Catholic name and the destruction of the Catholic order, and for the construction of a world wide Jewish empire." In 1962 Sigaud called for "counter-revolutionary combat," especially against Communism, and denounced "the implacable enemy of the Church and Catholic society...the Revolution." Determined to organize the conservative-minded Council Fathers to provide opposition to the more progressive bishops, he founded the Coetus Internationalis Patrum with the French Archbishop Marcel Lefebvre and his compatriot Bishop de Castro Mayer in 1963, later becoming the group's Secretary. During the Council, he brought a petition signed by 213 Fathers to Amleto Cardinal Cicognani, asking for the condemnation of Marxism, socialism and Communism (December 1963), and later presented Pope Paul VI with the petition of 510 Fathers for the Consecration of Russia to the Immaculate Heart of Mary (February 1964).

Sigaud started to act in favor of the Brazilian Society for the Defense of Tradition, Family and Property (TFP), founded in 1960 by Plinio Corrêa de Oliveira. Thus, in the sixties, in Brazil, Dom Sigaud made severe criticisms of the so-called progressive clergy, often clashing with Dom Hélder Câmara. He left TFP in the late 1960s. The Archbishop of Diamantina himself, on October 2, 1970, officially announced, coming out of an audience with the President of the Republic Emílio Garrastazu Médici, that the TFP had distanced himself from him because of his support for the agrarian reform promoted by the government and the reform liturgy of Paul VI.

Despite his conservative leanings, he implemented the Novus Ordo Missae in his diocese and did not support Archbishop Lefebvre's Society of St. Pius X. Sigaud resigned as Archbishop on September 10, 1980, after a 19-year-long tenure. He later died at age 89.

Catholic Church titles
Preceded by Ernesto de Paula	Bishop of Jacarezinho; 1947—1960	Succeeded by Pedro Filipak
Preceded by Jose Newton de Almeida Baptista	Archbishop of Diamantina; 1960—1980	Succeeded by Geraldo Majela Reis
