= Heralds of the Gospel =

International Catholic organization

- Evangelii Praecones
- Abbreviation: E.P.
- Predecessor: Tradition, Family, Property
- Formation: September 21, 1999
- Founder: João Scognamiglio Clá Dias
- Type: International association of pontifical right Society of apostolic life (Virgo Flos Carmeli and Regina Virginum)
- Headquarters: Rua Avaí, 430 - Pq. Santa Inês 07733-005 Caieiras, São Paulo, Brazil
- Members: 226 priests; 31 deacons; ~4,000 lay consecrated members
- Parent organization: Catholic Church
- Volunteers: ~40,000 cooperators (estimate)
- Website: https://www.heraldsusa.org/

The Heralds of the Gospel (Portuguese: Arautos do Evangelho; Latin: Evangelii Praecones, abbreviated to E.P.) is a Catholic international association of pontifical right founded on September 21, 1999, by Brazilian priest Monsignor João Scognamiglio Clá Dias. The association is formed by clerics, lay consecrated members, and affiliated members or cooperators. Two societies of apostolic life are also part of the group, one for men, Virgo Flos Carmeli, and other for women, Regina Virginum.

They have a presence in about 80 countries and are primarily focused on evangelism. The organization is active across many media platforms, providing Catholic formation education through courses and also in their own boarding schools. Members follow a regimented lifestyle and adhere to a colorful aesthetic based on gothic revival art and a church militant theme. The group has been described as traditionalist and anti-modernist.

== History ==
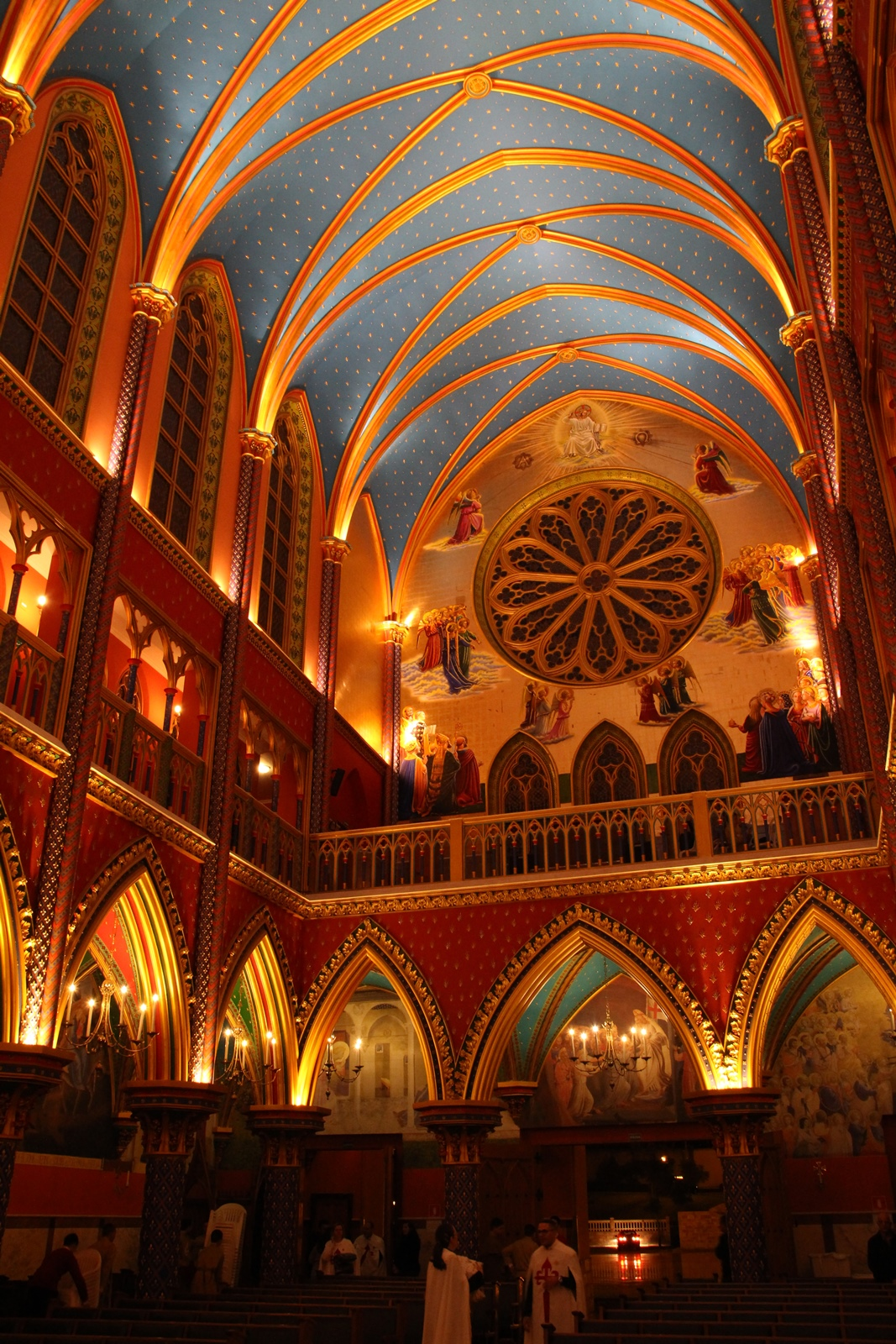
Basilica of Our Lady of the Rosary of Fatima with some cooperator members of the Heralds in the foreground.

The Heralds were recognized as an International Association of Pontifical Right by Pope John Paul II on 22 February 2001.

Consisting mainly of young people, Heralds of the Gospel is established in 80 countries. Its members practice celibacy and are dedicated to an apostolic life, living in separate houses designated for young men and young women. Their life of recollection, study and prayer alternates with evangelizing activities in dioceses and parishes, with special emphasis placed on the formation of youth. They also have a cooperator branch (formerly called companions in English) for those who cannot dedicate their lives entirely to apostolic works due to their own vocation, whether they are married, single or clerics.

The right-wing and conservative institution Tradition, Family, Property (TFP) is the direct predecessor of the Heralds. The philosophy of this institution based on the work of the conservative thinker Plinio Corrêa de Oliveira served as the main intellectual basis for the formation of the Heralds of the Gospel. One of the main objectives of the organization is to fight to maintain and strengthen the three fundamental values that give name to the group; tradition, family, and property. The TFP and the Heralds of Gospel were the subject of several academic papers.

== Spirituality ==
The spirituality of the Heralds of the Gospel is based on three essential points: the Eucharist, the Virgin Mary and the pope. These are represented in their distinct emblem: a mandorla containing a monstrance with a Host, Our Lady of Fátima, and the crossed Keys of Heaven crowned by the papal tiara.

Their charism leads them to strive for perfection and for beauty in their daily actions.

== Music ==
Seeing culture and art as effective tools of evangelization, the Heralds of the Gospel characteristically place special emphasis on both choral and instrumental music. Hence, the Heralds have formed various choirs and a number of concert bands to bring their ideology to the outside world.

The main musical ensemble of the Heralds of the Gospel, the International Choir and Symphonic Band, was started in São Paulo with members from a number of countries, all wearing the uniform of the Heralds. This musical ensemble has traveled to numerous cities in the various continents, giving presentations in churches, auditoriums and stadiums to satisfy what they see as peoples' desire for beauty and spirituality.

== Societies of apostolic life ==
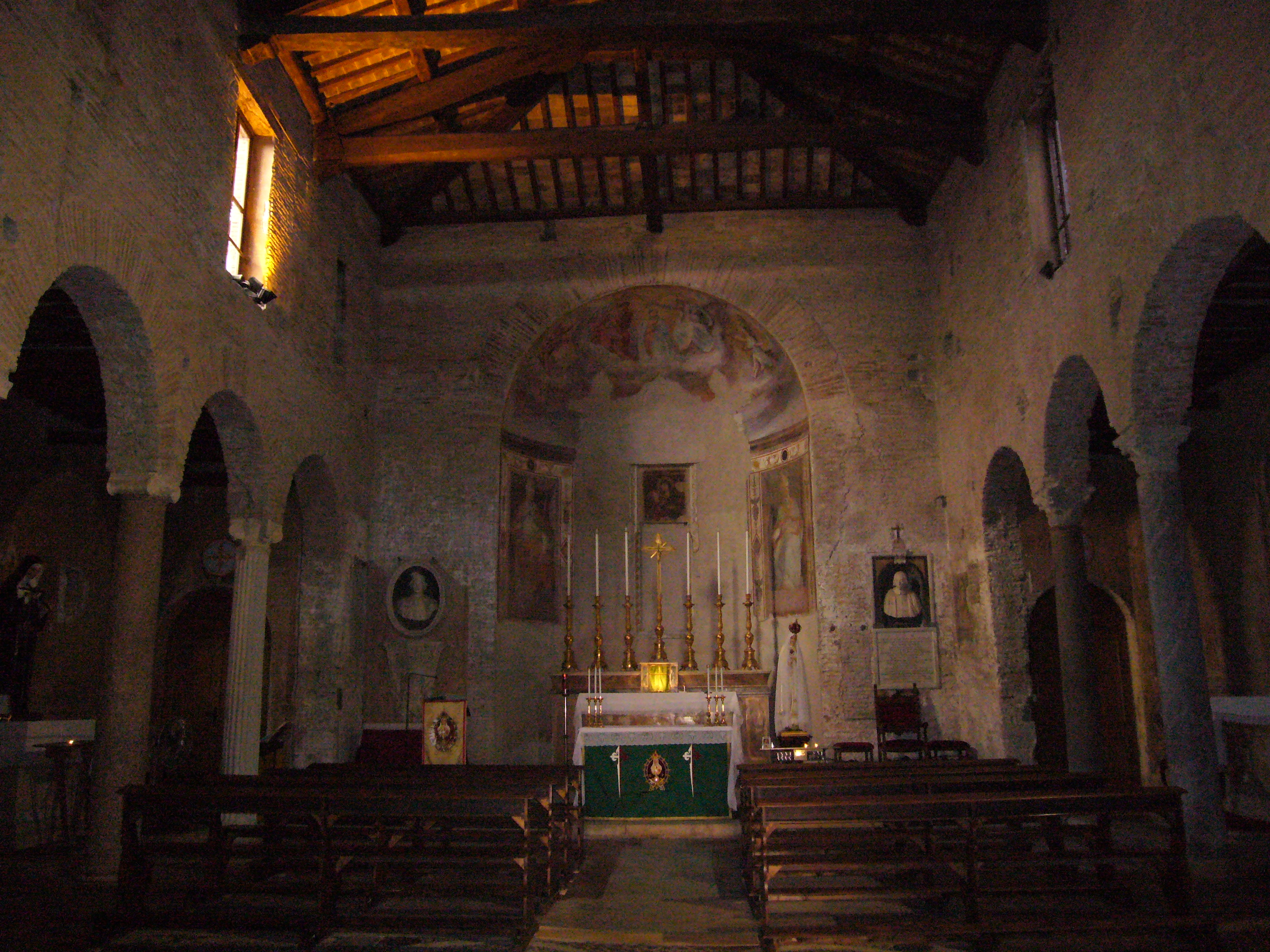
San Benedetto in Piscinula Church, in Rome

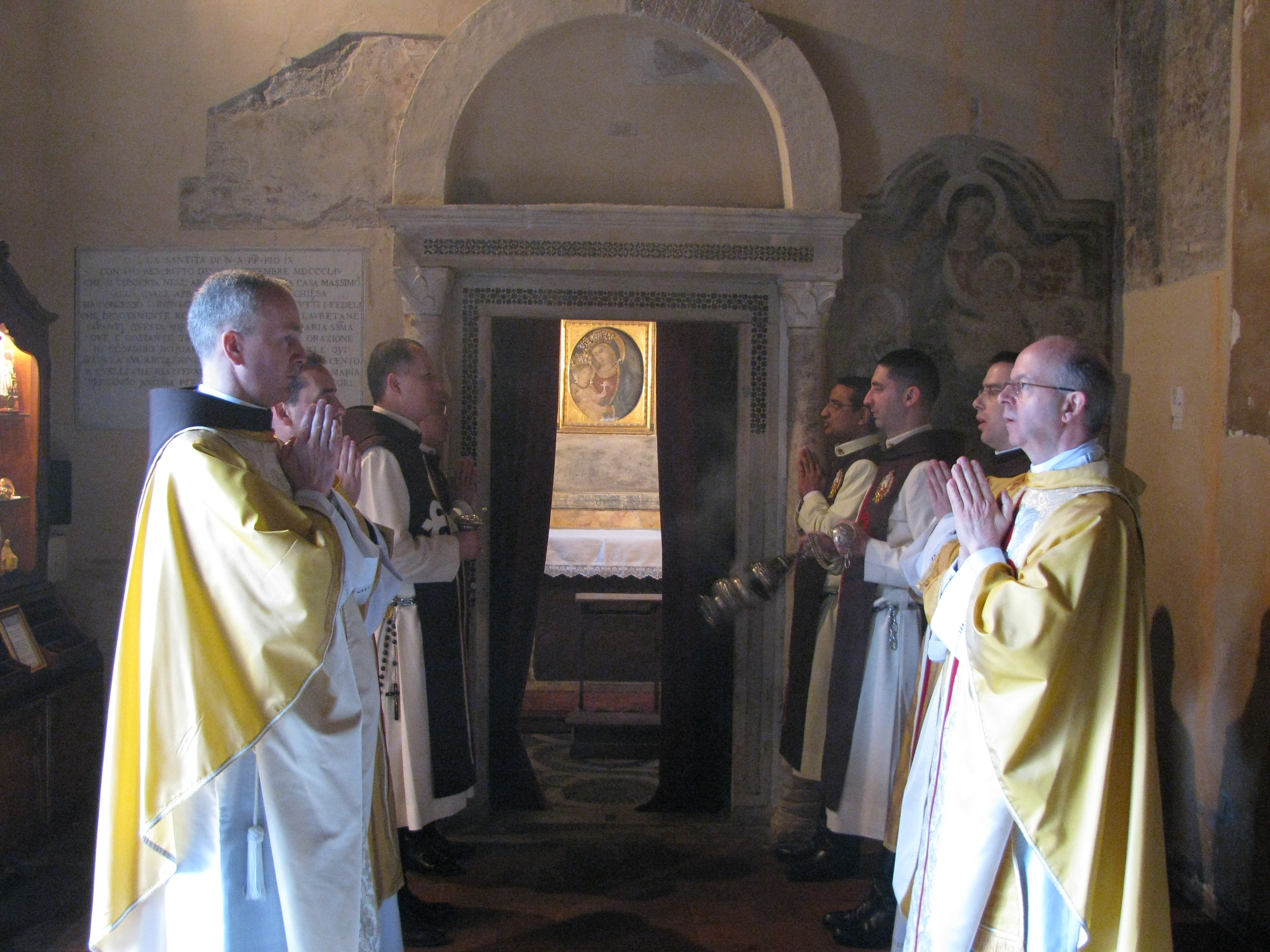
The Heralds of the Gospel in their church of San Benedetto in Piscinula in Rome

As a further development of the charism, the family of the Heralds of the Gospel has given rise to two societies of apostolic life:

- Virgo Flos Carmeli the priestly branch of the Heralds, began in 2005 with the ordinations of the first fifteen priests, including the founder of the Heralds of the Gospel.
- Regina Virginum the women's branch was founded on Christmas Day, 2005.

Both societies received papal approval in 2009, becoming a clerical society of apostolic life of pontifical right and a feminine society of apostolic life of pontifical right, respectively.

Arising from within the Heralds of the Gospel, and sharing the same values, the two new societies of apostolic life, however, have distinct natures. Virgo Flos Carmeli – "Virgin Flower of Carmel" in English – is characterized as a clerical society, in other words, consisting mainly of priests, while the society of apostolic life Regina Virginum – "Queen of Virgins" – is formed by women.

According to the Vatican decree, Virgo Flos Carmeli "is born amidst a loving and pertinacious catechesis on the Church and the Roman Pontiff, as well as respect for the importance of sacralization, to the greatest extent possible, of the values of temporal life." The decree goes on to state that the society is characterized by the defense of orthodoxy, purity of customs and the spirit of hierarchy, "as well as the desire to rekindle in humanity the distinction between good and evil (...)."

Virgo Flos Carmeli was founded by Msgr. João Scognamiglio Clá Dias, E.P., founder and president of the Heralds of the Gospel, and was erected by the then Bishop of Avezzano, Lucio Angelo Maria Renna, on 15 June 2006.

Afterward, José Maria Pinheiro, Bishop of Bragança Paulista, where the Motherhouse of the Society is located, requested Pontifical approval of Virgo Flos Carmeli from the Pope.

Regina Virginum, for its part, had its approval signed on 26 April 2009. According to the Vatican decree, the society of apostolic life of pontifical right, also founded by Msgr. João Scognamiglio Clá Dias, "arose as an expression of the charism of the Heralds of the Gospel, applied to the specific conditions of feminine life, striving to manifest its own characteristics in a particular way within the secularised world."

== Growth ==
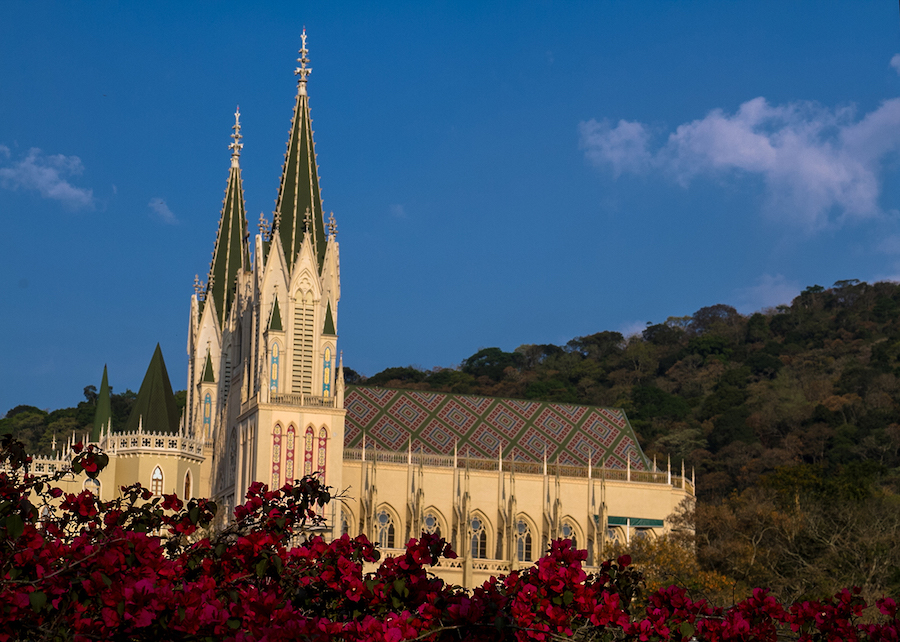
Our Lady of the Rosary Basilica, Caieiras

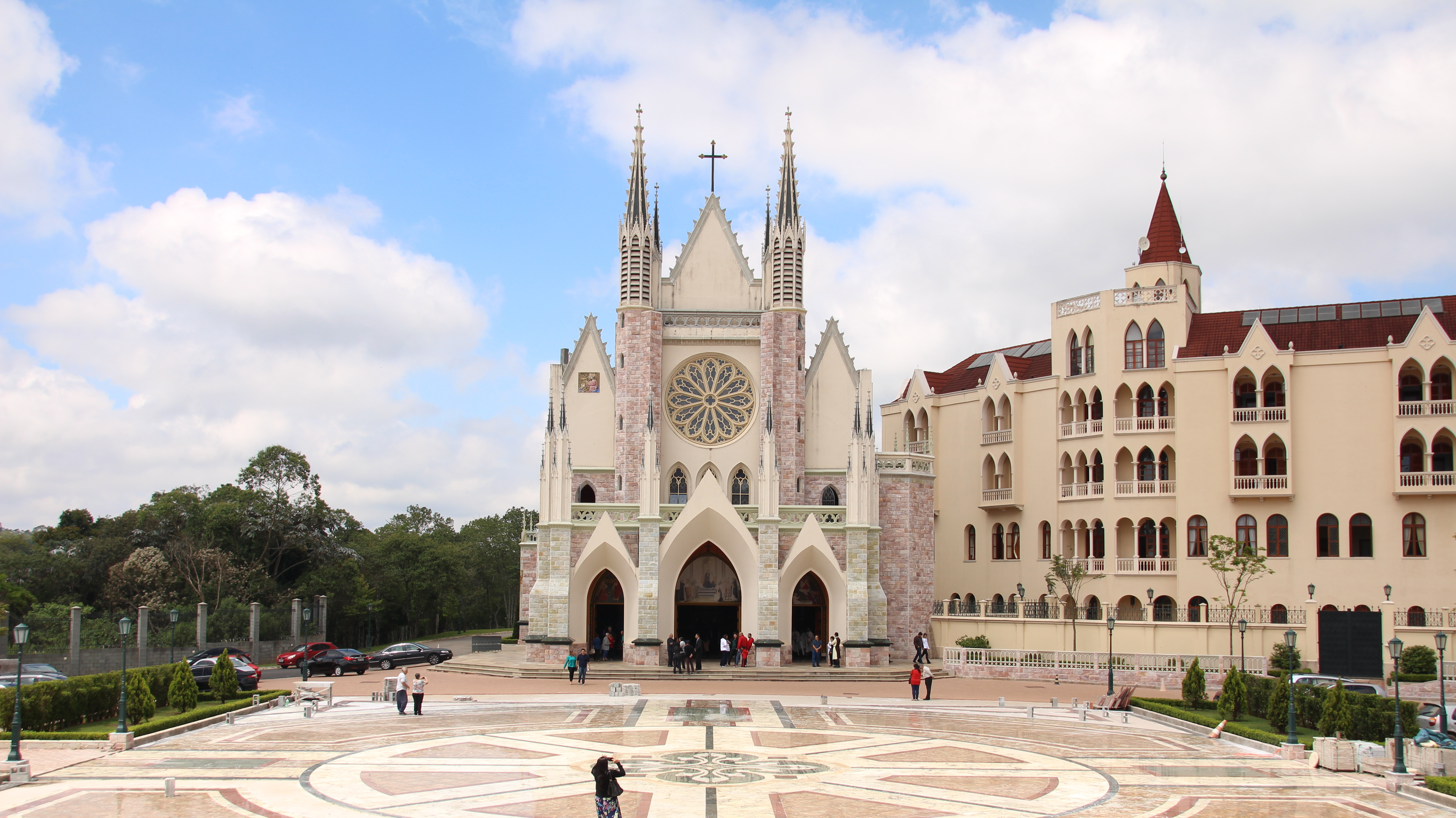
Our Lady of the Rosary of Fatima Basilica, Embu das Artes

The Heralds of the Gospel are growing, expanding their missionary activities to several countries and new cities in recent years.

Pope Benedict XVI said: "There are also, however, new Catholic awakenings, a dynamic of new movements, for instance, the "Heralds of the Gospel", young people who are seized by the enthusiasm of having acknowledged Christ as the Son of God and of bringing him into the world."

The first church entrusted to the Heralds was San Benedetto in Piscinula in Rome in 2003 and more have followed, with Our Lady of the Rosary, Caieiras, Brazil, the first honored with the title of minor basilica, in 2012. In 2014 the Heralds church Our Lady of the Rosary of Fatima in Embu das Artes, São Paulo, Brazil, was also named by the Vatican a minor basilica.

They also operate several schools and are in partnerships with several other educational institutions, such as the Lumen Veritatis Academy, of noted excellence in academics and Catholic religious education.

Many of the Heralds of the Gospel members receive the Sacrament of Holy Orders through the Society of the Apostolic Life of Pontifical Right Virgo Flos Carmeli., which enjoys numerous vocations.

== Investigation by the Vatican ==
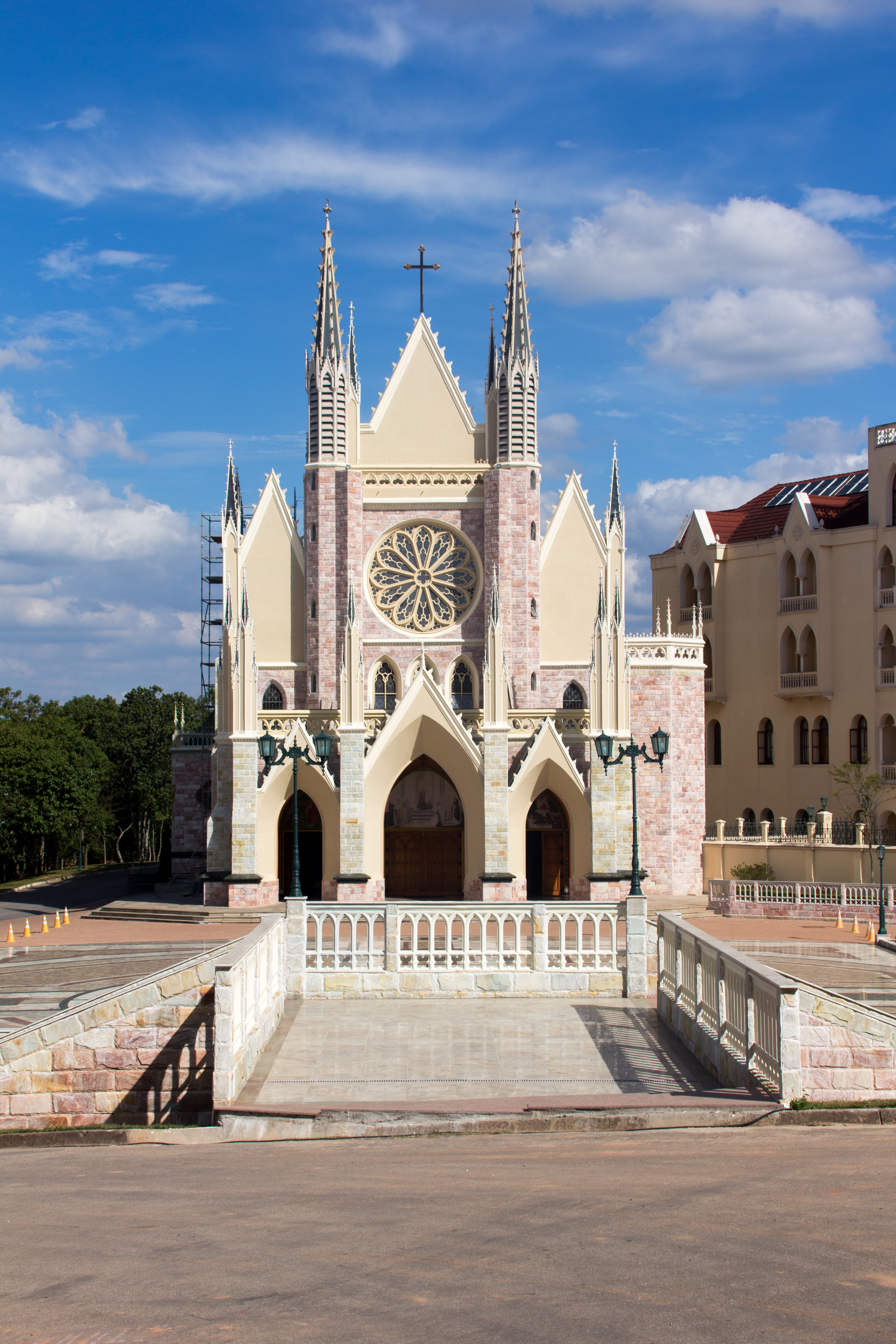
Our Lady of the Rosary of Fatima Basilica, Embu das Artes

In 2017, the Vatican instituted an apostolic visitation of the Heralds under the direction of the Congregation for Institutes of Consecrated Life. On 12 June 2017 Clá Dias stepped down as superior general but continued to be "father" of the Heralds. The visitation found "shortcomings concerning the style of government, the life of the members of the Council, the pastoral care of vocations, the formation of new vocations, administration, the management of works and fundraising." As a result of the visitation, Pope Francis appointed Cardinal Raymundo Damasceno Assis, Archbishop Emeritus of Aparecida, as pontifical commissioner, to be assisted by Bishop José Aparecido Gonçalves de Almeida and Sr Marian Ambrosio, IDP in overseeing the Heralds and its two branches of consecrated men and women. The Heralds are "strongly linked to groups in the Church which oppose the reforms of Pope Francis."

An element in this investigation was a video presented by Andrea Tornielli, in an article published in the newspaper La Stampa, which showed several members of the Heralds of the Gospel listening to a description of an "exorcism". In the video, a priest recounted claims made by a demon during an exorcism, claiming that "the Vatican is mine" and foretelling the death of Pope Francis, causing some in the group, including Clá Dias, to laugh. At that time, the Heralds issued a clarification note stating that this was an old video and that the leak had occurred improperly as it was for theological studies. It further clarified that all the appropriate steps had been taken under canon law and in light of the Catholic theology.

Investigations by the Canadian Broadcasting Corporation also revealed supposed abuses of the Heralds against pupils in the boarding schools operated by the group. It was reported that the Holy See requested for the Heralds to close the boarding schools it operates in Brazil to educate children and adolescents. The Heralds later published a press release denying that this request was made, and stating that it was not legally possible for any ecclesiastical authority to close private schools subject to local laws. The public civil actions filed against the Arautos do Evangelho Association and its schools were extinguished by a decision of the Children and Youth Court of the state of São Paulo. The civil complaints were later reintroduced after a series of reports that began in 2022. On July 23, 2024, however, in a new decision the complaints were considered unfounded and illegitimate by the same court.
