= Coetus Internationalis Patrum =

Interest group at the Second Vatican Council

The Coetus Internationalis Patrum (Latin: International Group of Fathers) was the most important and influential interest group of the "conservative" or "traditionalist" minority at the Second Vatican Council.

== Organization and membership ==
During the first session of the Council, they acted informally as an unnamed "study group" of individual Council fathers of traditionalist orientation. Between the first and second sessions of the council, Archbishops Marcel Lefebvre (Superior CSSp) and Geraldo de Proença Sigaud (Diamantina, Brazil) and Bishop José Maurício da Rocha (Bragança, Brazil) decided to organize a more formal group of like-minded bishops. The group soon established a steering committee, of archbishops Lefebvre and Proença Sigaud, bishops Luigi Maria Carli (Segni), Antônio de Castro Mayer (Campos, Brazil). and the Abbot of Solesmes, Jean Prou OSB. After the second session of the Council, the Group came formally into existence, issuing a circular letter signed by archbishops Lefebvre, Proença Sigaud, Cabana (Sherbrooke, Quebec, Canada), Silva Santiago (Concepción, Chile (emeritus)), Lacchio (Changsha, China) and Cordeiro (Karachi, Pakistan), which announced a group of Council fathers attached to the traditions of the Church.

Sources close to the organization report it had 250 members out of the approximately 2,400 bishops attending the Council at any given time. Other studies describe it either as having 16 "core members" or as having 5 members in the steering committee, 55 general members, and 9 supporting cardinals. In addition to the Council fathers, there were also theologians who formed a minor group that helped formulate the group's responses on issues being discussed in the council. On specific topics, they were able to gather additional adherents among the Council fathers; they obtained 435 signatures on a petition calling for an explicit condemnation of communism.

== Issues ==
As a member of the Preparatory Commission for the Second Vatican Council, Archbishop Marcel Lefebvre had taken part in the discussions about the draft documents submitted to the bishops for consideration at the Council. His concerns with these proposals led to the formation of the study group to deal with a number of issues at the Council. A primary element of their agenda was opposition to the principle of episcopal collegiality, which they feared could undermine papal primacy and the rights of individual bishops. They thought there should be a specific condemnation of Communism, as well as a separate Council document on the Blessed Virgin Mary instead of a mere chapter in Lumen gentium.

Continuing complaints from the Group about the presence of Protestant observers led Pope Paul VI, who was "concerned not to alienate the traditionalists", to ask Cardinal Augustin Bea "if perhaps the presence of the 'separated brethren' and their 'mentality' were 'excessively dominating the council, thus diminishing its psychological freedom.' (He) emphasized that protecting 'the coherence of the teaching of the Catholic Church' was more important than pleasing the observers.'" After thus consulting Cardinal Bea, the Pope decided not to disinvite the observers.

== Influence ==
The influence of the Group on the outcomes, in particular the final documents, of the Council was mixed and partial. The traditionalists' opposition to the principle of episcopal collegiality, and specifically to the granting of greater authority to conferences of bishops, made it difficult for them to work effectively with the national and regional bishops' conferences (which stood to gain authority from the reforms). Some have written that the Group's opposition to collegial decision-making also had an effect in terms of its reluctance to achieve consensus by developing compromise positions.

The traditionalists, however, did have somewhat more success using other channels. The Group had many contacts in the Papal Curia who shared their traditionalist point of view, and in the early years of the Council they were effective in using these back channels to make their opinions known at the highest levels. In the later years of the Council, they produced an almost uninterrupted flood of modi (amendments) to the proposals before the Council. These moves were not always successful; between the third and fourth sessions, the group was repudiated by Cardinal Cicognani, the Vatican Secretary of State, for their divisive influence on the assembly.

On specific issues, they failed to defeat the constitution on the liturgy, which introduced the vernacular and gave greater authority to episcopal conferences, or the decree on ecumenism, which some say undermined the traditional belief that the Catholic Church is the unique path to salvation. Their petition insisting on a condemnation of Communism in the constitution on the Church in the Modern World was only slightly more successful; it led to the insertion of a footnote which referred to an earlier papal condemnation of Communism, without mentioning the word. Perhaps their greatest success involved a last-minute papal intervention, where Pope Paul VI insisted on the insertion of an explanatory note into the document on the Church, which significantly weakened the force of its claims for collegiality.

=== Later reemergence ===
In October 2019, shortly before the opening of the Synod of Bishops for the Pan-Amazon region, an anonymous group of bishops and Catholic laypeople calling itself the Coetus Internationalis Patrum Working Group released a text, arguing that four theses drawn from the Synod's Instrumentum Laboris or Working Document were unacceptable for contradicting points of Catholic doctrine.
