= Santa Maria dell'Orazione e Morte =

Church in Rome, Italy

Coordinates: 41.8945°N 12.4696°E

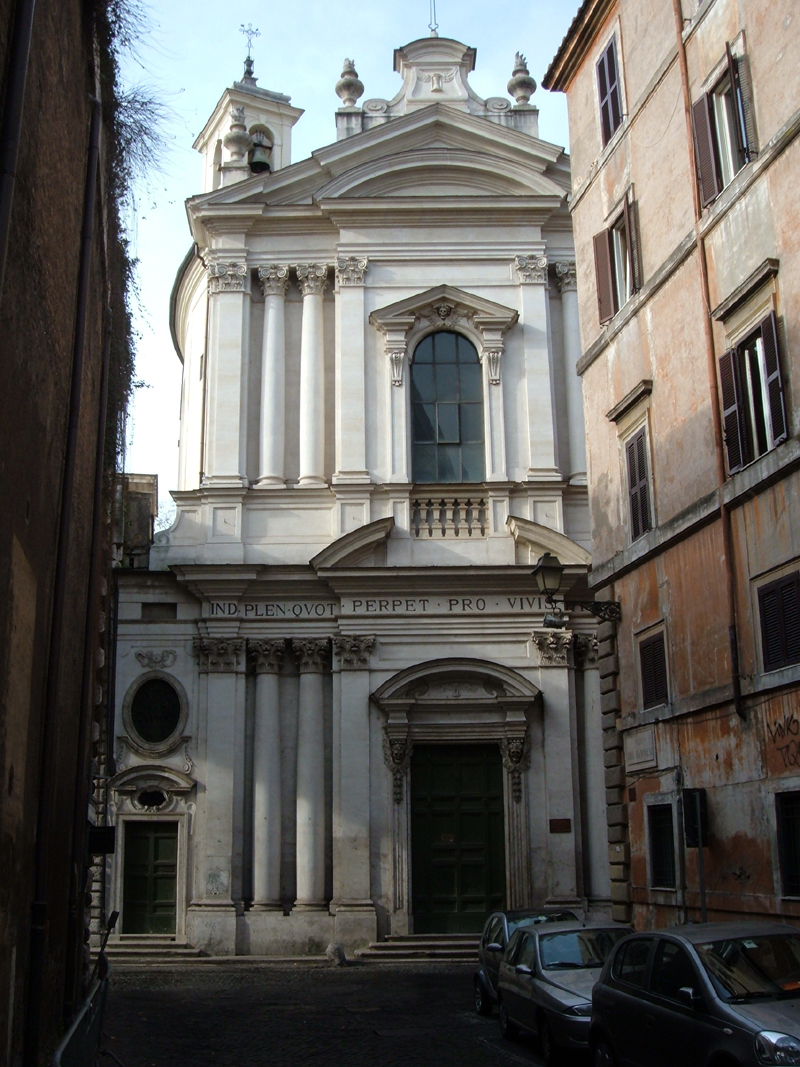
Santa Maria dell'Orazione e Morte.

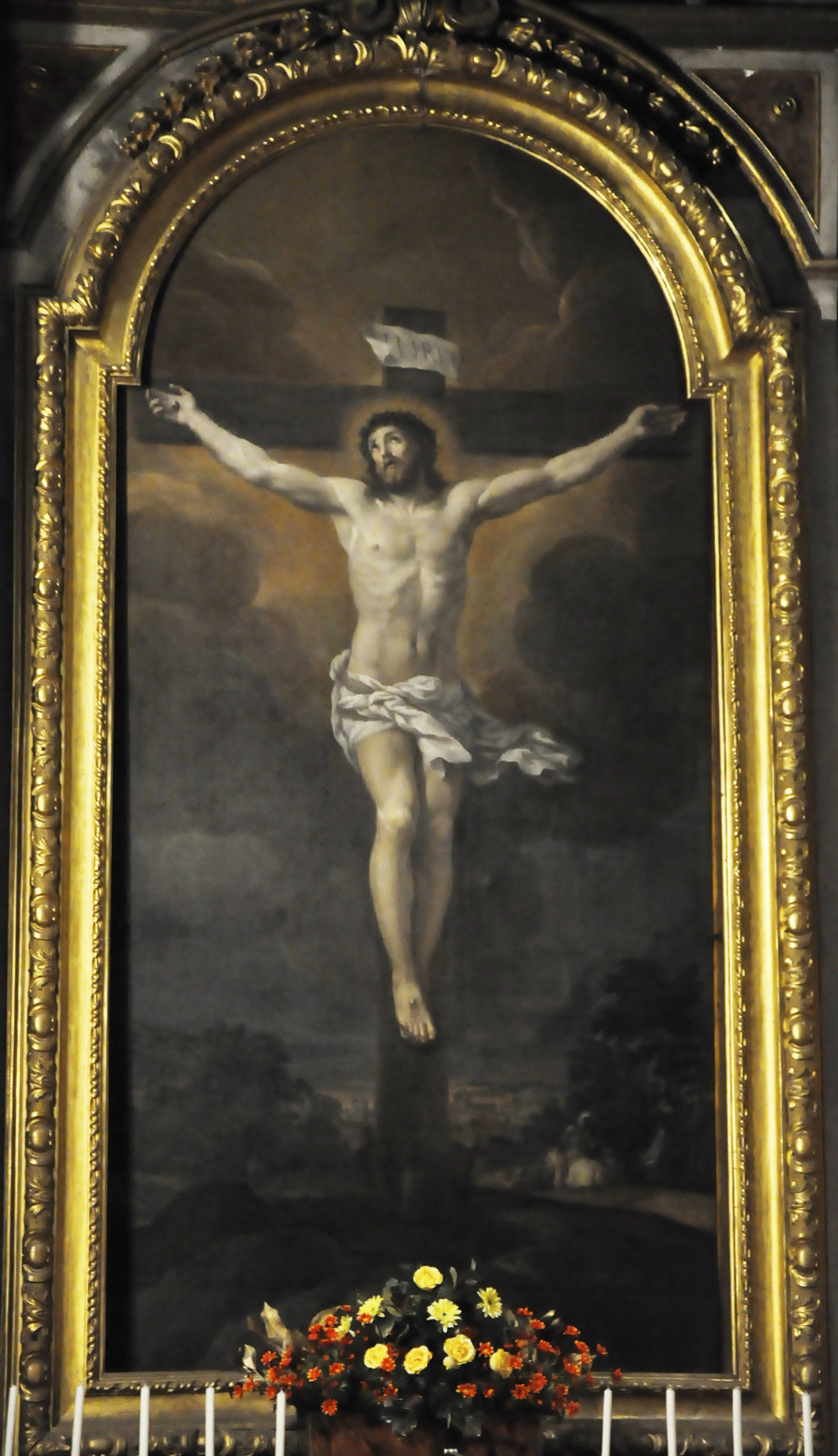
Crucifixion by Ciro Ferri.

Santa Maria dell'Orazione e Morte (Saint Mary of Prayer and Death) is a church in central Rome, Italy. It lies on Via Giulia between the Tiber and the Palazzo Farnese.

== History ==
Santa Maria was built by a confraternity, that assumed responsibility for interring abandoned corpses in Rome. Its charity was, and still is, supported by the Arciconfraternita di Santa Maria dell'Orazione e Morte, a purgatorial society dating to the 1538 at San Lorenzo in Damaso. Burials were performed in their coemeterium, once sited on the banks of the Tiber adjacent to the church.

First built in 1575, the church was completely rebuilt by Ferdinando Fuga in 1734 using an elliptical plan. Fuga was a member of the fraternity, as was Charles Borromeo.

It is remarkable for the depictions of laureled skulls over the façade entrance and other death imagery. There are two engraved plaques on each side of the facade: one depicts a winged skeleton with the inscription "Hodie mihi, cras tibi", i.e. “Today for me, tomorrow for you”, the other, over an almsbox, is the seated death who, holding a winged hourglass in his hand, observing a dying man. Over the main door is a curvilinear tympanum that encloses an aedicula with a winged hourglass, a symbol of the incessant passing of time towards death. The church is an example of the cult of death, also seen in the Roman church of the Capuchins.

Since 1940 the confraternity has been active as a secular charity based at the church, mainly to give assistance in cases of bereavement. As of 23 July 2022, the church remained closed for renovations.

== Interior ==
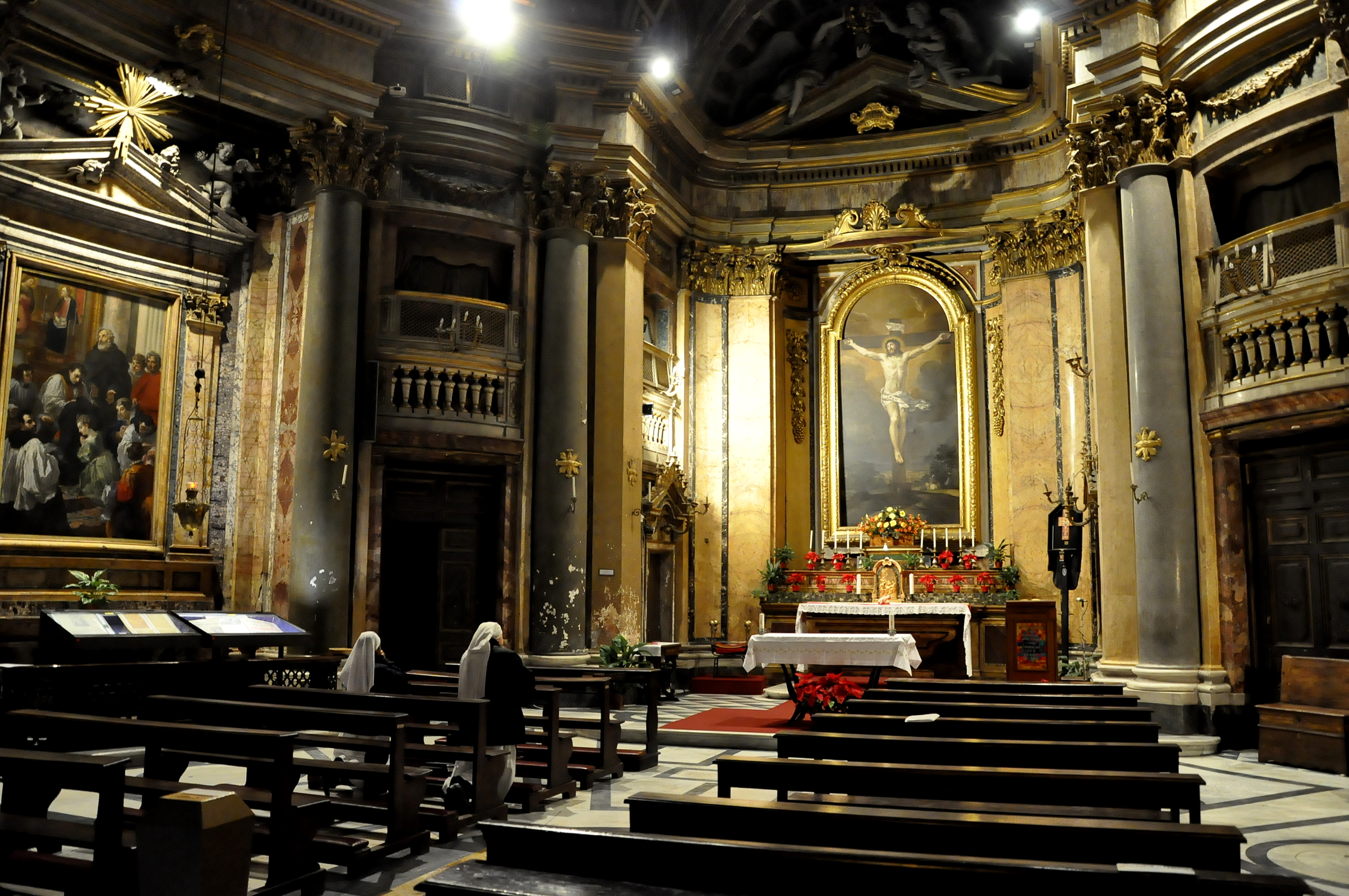
Interior view.

Over the main altar is a Crucifixion(1680) by Ciro Ferri, inspired by Guido Reni's "Crucifixion of Christ", in San Lorenzo in Lucina. Near the sanctuary are a pair of opera-boxes for solo musicians. Above the organ is a Baroque tablet with a quote from the Book of Tobit: "When you prayed with tears, and buried the dead, and left your meal, I,[Raphael the Archangel] took your prayer to God".(Tobit, 5:12)

In the first chapel at the right is dedicated to Saint Catherine of Alexandria. Between this chapel and the next is a fresco of the hermits St. Anthony Abbot and St. Paul of Thebes by Giovanni Lanfranco; this was removed and transferred to this church from the now-lost structure built by Odoardo Farnese. The Camerino degli Eremiti in the Palazzetto Farnese was demolished in 1734 to allow for the construction of the church.

The second chapel on the right is dedicated to the Archangel Michael, represented in the altarpiece as he cuts his sword against the chained demon whose head he crushes. It is a copy from 1750, which reproduces the well-known painting by Guido Reni, created for the church of Santa Maria della Concezione dei Cappuccini. Saint Michael is the protector of the dying from the attacks of the devil.

In the first chapel to the left is dedicated to the Holy Family and features an altarpiece of the Rest on the Flight to Egypt painted by Lorenzo Masucci. Between this and the second chapel is a fresco of St Simeon Stylites, also from the old Camerino degli Eremiti. In the second chapel to the left is St Giuliana Falconieri Receives the Habit From St. Filippo Benizi (1740) by Pier Leone Ghezzi.

Additionally, the church houses a chamber decorated with human bones; a large number of skulls, candelabras constructed of bones, and a large cross adorned with skulls are among the room's adornments. This chamber is located through a door to the left of the main altar and is rarely open to visitors.

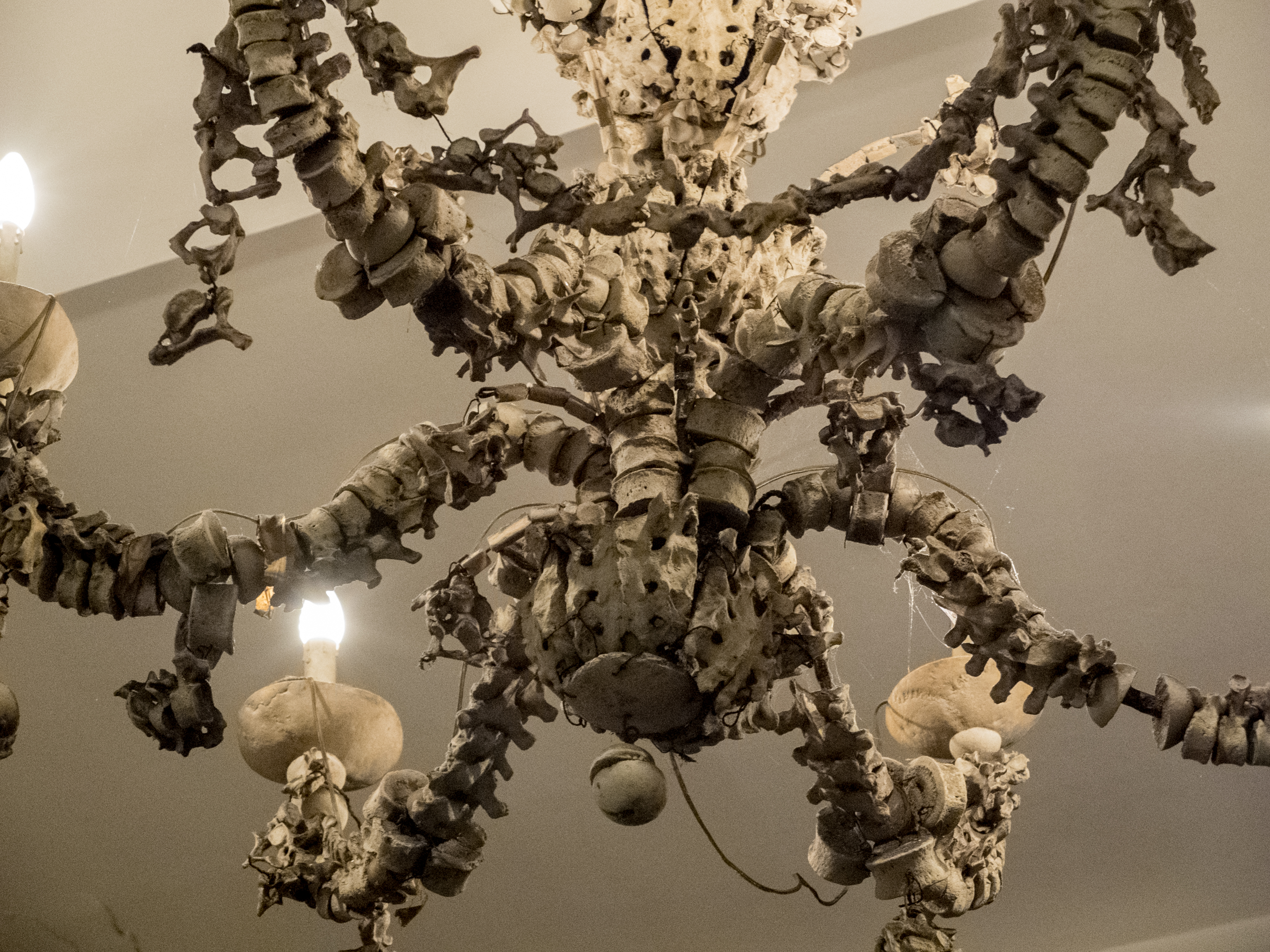
Detail of human bones chandelier in chamber of Santa Maria dell'Orazione e Morte
