= Conrado Walter =

German-born Brazilian prelate (1923–2018)

Conrado Walter, S.A.C.
- Bishop of Diocese of Jacarezinho (emeritus)
- Church: Roman Catholic Church
- See: Roman Catholic Diocese of Jacarezinho
- In office: 1991–2000
- Predecessor: Pedro Filipak
- Successor: Fernando José Penteado
- Previous post(s): prelate

Orders
- Ordination: 2 December 1956

Personal details
- Born: 19 June 1923; Bichishausen, Germany
- Died: 20 September 2018 (aged 95)

Conrado Walter, S.A.C. (19 June 1923 – 20 September 2018) was a German-born Brazilian prelate of the Roman Catholic Church.

Walter was born in Bichishausen, Germany and was ordained a priest on 2 December 1956 from the Religious order of Society of the Catholic Apostolate. Walter was appointed Auxiliary Bishop of the Diocese of Jacarezinho on 1 December 1977 as well as Titular bishop of Lysinia and ordained on 3 February 1978. Walter was appointed Coadjutor bishop of Jacarezinho on 26 November 1984 and succeeded as bishop on 10 August 1991. Walter retired 5 July 2000. He died in September 2018 at the age of 95.
