= Diocese of Jacarezinho =

Catholic ecclesiastical territory

Diocese of Jacarezinho Dioecesis Iacarezinhoënsis

Catholic
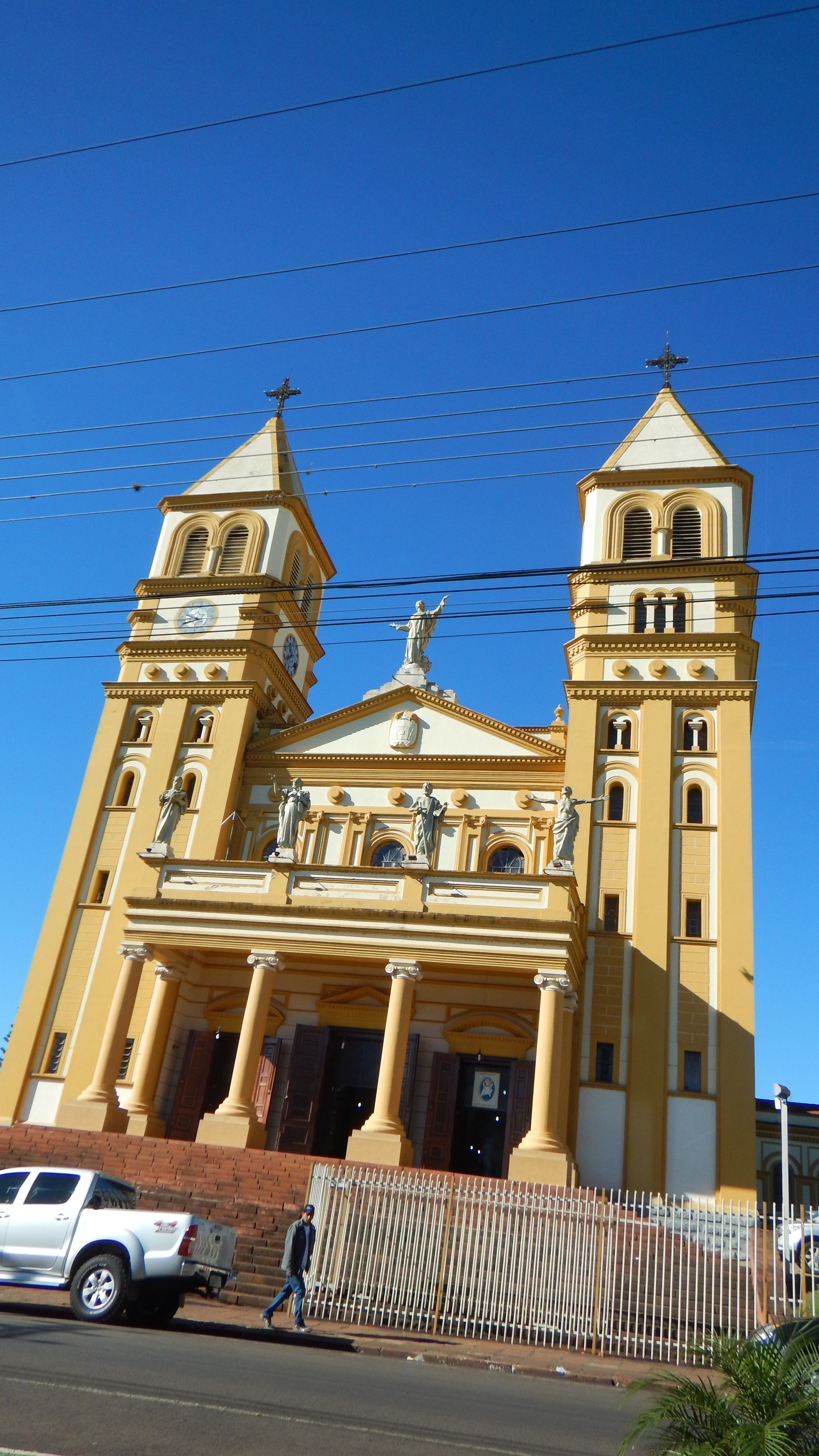
- Catedral Nossa Senhora da Conceição e São Sebastião in 2016

Location
- Country: Brazil
- Ecclesiastical province: Londrina

Statistics
- Area: 13,369 km^{2} (5,162 sq mi)
- Population: Total; Catholics: (as of 2006); 437,000; 380,000 (87.0%)

Information
- Rite: Latin Rite
- Established: 10 May 1926 (100 years ago)
- Cathedral: Catedral Nossa Senhora da Conceição e São Sebastião

Current leadership
- Pope: Leo XIV
- Bishop: Antônio Braz Benevente
- Metropolitan Archbishop: Geremias Steinmetz
- Bishops emeritus: Fernando José Penteado

The Roman Catholic Diocese of Jacarezinho (Latin: Dioecesis Iacarezinhoënsis) is a diocese in the city of Jacarezinho in the ecclesiastical province of Londrina in Brazil.

== History ==
- May 10, 1926: Established as Diocese of Jacarezinho from the Diocese of Curitiba

== Bishops ==
- Bishops of Jacarezinho (Roman rite), in reverse chronological order
  - Bishop Antônio Braz Benevente (7 September 2010 – present)
  - Bishop Fernando José Penteado (5 July 2000 – 23 June 2010)
  - Bishop Conrado Walter, S.A.C. (10 August 1991 – 5 July 2000)
  - Bishop Pedro Filipak (8 February 1962 – 10 August 1991)
  - Bishop Geraldo de Proença Sigaud, S.V.D. (later Archbishop) (29 October 1946 – 20 December 1960), appointed Archbishop of Diamantina, Minas Gerais
  - Bishop Ernesto de Paula (22 November 1941 – 30 June 1945), appointed Bishop of Piracicaba, São Paulo
  - Bishop Fernando Taddei, C.M. (22 April 1927 – 9 January 1940)

=== Coadjutor bishop ===
- Conrado Walter, S.A.C. (1984-1991)

=== Auxiliary bishop ===
- Conrado Walter, S.A.C. † (1977-1984), appointed Coadjutor here

=== Other priests of this diocese who became bishops ===
- Mauro Aparecido dos Santos, appointed Coadjutor Bishop of Campo Mourão, Parana in 1998
- Elizeu de Morais Pimentel, appointed Coadjutor Bishop of Paranavaí, Parana in 2001
- Mário Antônio da Silva, appointed Auxiliary Bishop of Manaus, Amazonas in 2010
