= America Needs Fatima =

Catholic advocacy group

- Formation: 1994
- Founded: 1985
- Founder: C. Preston Noell, III
- Type: 501(c)(3) Charity
- Purpose: Spread religious devotion to Our Lady of Fatima in the United States
- Headquarters: Spring Grove, Pennsylvania
- Location: United States
- Executive Director: Robert E. Ritchie
- Parent organization: The American TFP
- Website: americaneedsfatima.org

America Needs Fatima is a campaign of the American Society for the Defense of Tradition, Family and Property (TFP), a Catholic 501(c)(3) non-profit organization. It advocates faith and morals based on the teachings of the Virgin Mary, particularly based on the visions of an apparition of her reported by three children in Fátima, Portugal in 1917.

== Activities ==
America Needs Fatima is a conservative advocacy group that opposes abortion, same-sex marriage, euthanasia, and socialism. It applies its interpretation of the message of Our Lady of Fatima to what it sees as the moral crisis in society.

=== Fatima home visits ===
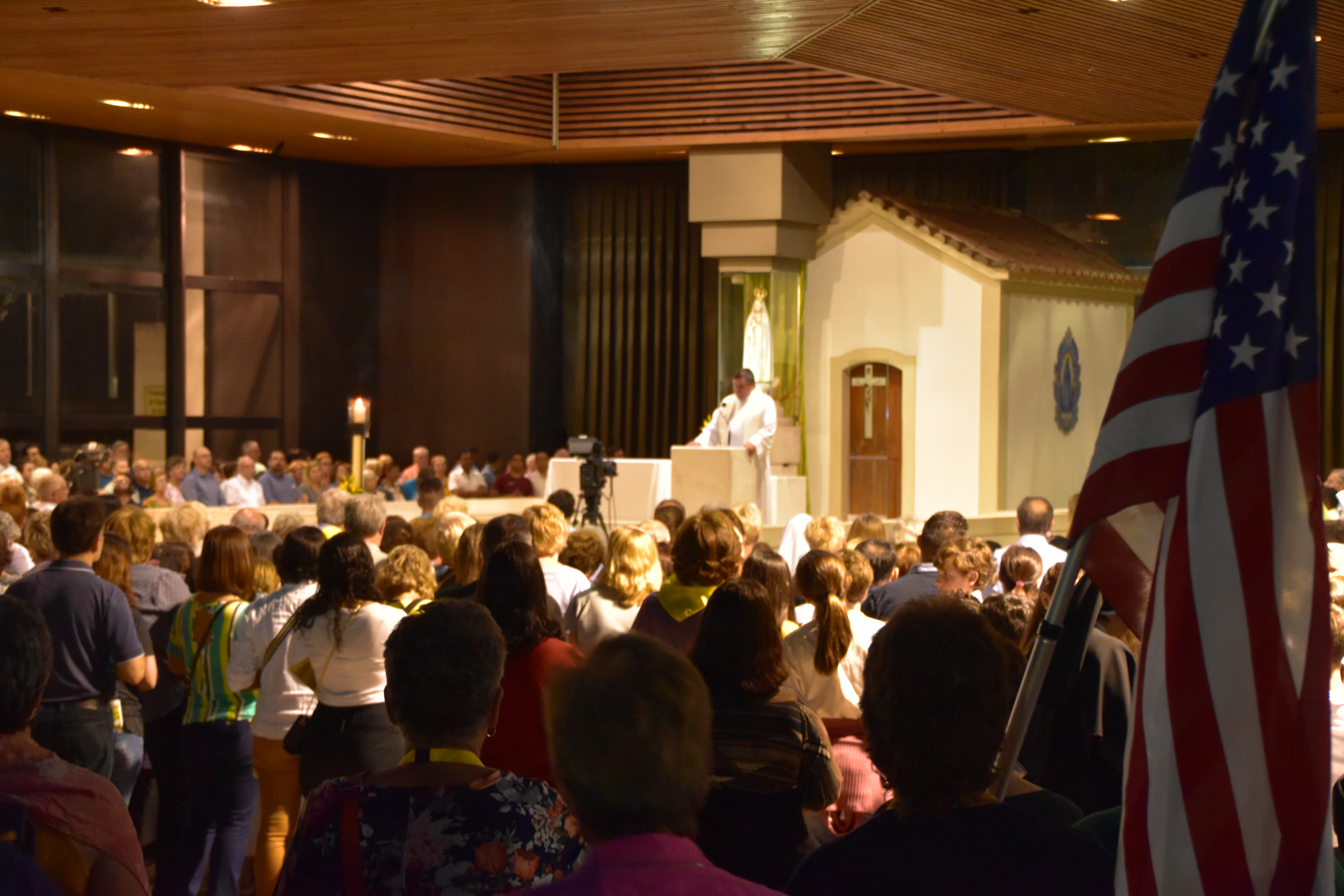
American pilgrims at the Chapel of the Apparitions in Fátima, Portugal.

Since 1994, the primary activity of America Needs Fatima has been the "Mary in Every Home" program. It consists of a Fatima custodian taking a four-foot tall statue of Our Lady of Fátima to a person's home, with a crowning and enthronement ceremony, a short audio-visual about the story of Fátima, Portugal, and the praying of the rosary.

=== Anti-blasphemy protests ===
America Needs Fatima has protested films, plays, and art exhibits it considers blasphemous or otherwise offensive to Catholicism. Protests consist of sending protest cards, making phone calls, and sending mass e-mails as well as proximate street demonstrations.

Films, plays, and art exhibits that America Needs Fatima has protested include:

- The Da Vinci Code
- The Crime of Father Amaro
- Dogma
- Jesus Has Two Mommies
- Jerry Springer: The Opera
- A Fire in My Belly, by David Wojnarowicz, at the Brooklyn Museum of Art
- Our Lady by Alma Lopez

America Needs Fatima protesters showed up at the Uptown Players production of The Most Fabulous Story Ever Told in December 2013. Actor Stan Graner commented, “I appreciate the protesters exercising their right to protest, and they seemed to be doing it in a sincere and peaceful manner. But I can’t help but think that by helping to draw attention to the controversial production they are also in fact supplying free advertising for the show. ”

ANF also organized protests in 2017 against Out Front Theater's production of The Most Fabulous Story Ever Told in Atlanta, GA.

=== Public Square Rosary Crusade ===
Since 2007, America Needs Fatima has organized an annual "Public Square Rosary Crusade," consisting of ANF "Rally Captains" organizing prayer vigils in public places, such as a sidewalk or street corner, in their local town or city. The first campaign was held on October 13, 2007, the 90th anniversary of the "Miracle of the Sun."

According to its website, approximately 2,000 rallies were held in 2007, 3,500 in 2008, 4,337 in 2009, 5,963 in 2010, and 7,515 in 2011.

== See also ==
- Our Lady of Fátima
- Sanctuary of Fátima
- American Society for the Defense of Tradition, Family and Property
