= Plinio Corrêa de Oliveira =

Brazilian intellectual (1908–1995)

Plinio Corrêa de Oliveira T.OCarm
- Born: December 13, 1908; São Paulo, Brazil
- Died: October 3, 1995 (aged 86); São Paulo, Brazil

Education
- Education: University of São Paulo

Philosophical work
- Era: 20th-century philosophy
- Region: Western philosophy
- School: Counter-revolutionary; Thomism; Augustinianism; Platonism
- Institutions: Sodality of Our Lady, Catholic Action, Tradition, Family and Property; Heralds of the Gospel
- Notable students: João Scognamiglio Clá Dias
- Main interests: Theology, politics

Plinio Corrêa de Oliveira (December 13, 1908 – October 3, 1995) was a Brazilian Catholic intellectual, writer, university professor, and political activist. A leading figure of twentieth-century traditionalist Catholicism in Latin America, he is best known as the founder of the Brazilian Society for the Defense of Tradition, Family, and Property (TFP) and as the author of Revolution and Counter-Revolution (1959).

Born in São Paulo into a family with roots in the Pernambucan and Paulista landed aristocracy, Corrêa de Oliveira was educated by the Jesuits and graduated in law from the University of São Paulo. Active in the Marian Congregations and the Catholic Electoral League, in 1933 he was elected to Brazil's Constituent Assembly at the age of 24, the youngest member of that body. He later held the chair of Modern and Contemporary History at the Pontifical Catholic University of São Paulo and served as the first president of the São Paulo Archdiocesan Board of Catholic Action, a position he lost in 1944 after publishing In Defense of Catholic Action (1943), which attacked the French Catholic philosopher Jacques Maritain.

His thought combined Thomism with a counter-revolutionary philosophy of history that interpreted the Protestant Reformation, the French Revolution, and twentieth-century Communism as three successive stages of a single process aimed at the destruction of Christian civilization. Through the journal Catolicismo and a long-running column in Folha de S.Paulo, he became one of Brazil's most prominent conservative voices, opposing agrarian reform, liberation theology, and the reforms of the Second Vatican Council, which he later described as "one of the greatest calamities, if not the greatest, in the history of the Church." Scholars have variously characterized his positions as ultramontanist, integralist, or fundamentalist, and have examined the TFP's role in the conservative mobilization preceding Brazil's 1964 military coup; articles he published in the early 1930s contained antisemitic views that have been examined by historians of Brazilian Catholic thought. After his death the TFP fractured into competing successor organizations, principally the Heralds of the Gospel and the Plinio Corrêa de Oliveira Institute (IPCO), and his writings continue to influence transnational Catholic conservative network.

== Early life and education ==
Plinio Corrêa de Oliveira was born in São Paulo on December 13, 1908, into a family associated with Brazil's traditional Catholic landowning elite. His father João Paulo Corrêa de Oliveira came from the sugar-planting aristocracy of Pernambuco, while his mother, Lucilia Ribeiro dos Santos, belonged to a prominent Paulista family connected to the coffee economy of São Paulo.

He was raised in São Paulo under the strong religious influence of his mother and educated at the Jesuit Colégio São Luís, then attended by much of the city's Catholic upper class. Biographers writing within the traditionalist Catholic milieu have emphasised the formative role of his mother's piety and of the Ignatian methods of spiritual formation he encountered at the Colégio, both of which he would later cite as decisive influences on his religious and intellectual outlook.

In the mid-1920s Corrêa de Oliveira enrolled at the Law School of the University of São Paulo.

== Catholic Action and political career (1928–1944) ==
=== Marian Congregations and Catholic Electoral League ===
In 1928 Corrêa de Oliveira joined the Marian Congregations of São Paulo, the male lay devotional confraternity that was then one of the principal organisational vehicles of São Paulo's neo-Christendom Catholicism. A capable orator and organiser, he rose quickly within the movement and by the early 1930s had become one of its most prominent national figures.

The 1930 Revolution and the convening of a Constituent Assembly opened a political space that the Brazilian episcopate, led by Cardinal Sebastião Leme of Rio de Janeiro, sought to exploit through the foundation of the Catholic Electoral League (Liga Eleitoral Católica, LEC) in 1932. The LEC was conceived not as a confessional party but as a non-partisan pressure group: it vetted candidates from across the existing parties and endorsed those who pledged to support a Catholic legislative platform, including obligatory religious instruction in public schools, the constitutional prohibition of divorce, the civil recognition of religious marriage, and the establishment of military and prison chaplaincies. Corrêa de Oliveira was among the young Marian leaders who helped organise the League in São Paulo.

=== 1933 Constituent Assembly ===
Although the LEC generally avoided fielding its own candidates, in São Paulo Archbishop Duarte Leopoldo e Silva placed Corrêa de Oliveira on the Single Ticket (Chapa Única) as a Catholic representative for the May 1933 elections to the National Constituent Assembly. Backed by the grassroots mobilisation of the Marian Congregations, he was elected at the age of 24, making him the youngest member of the Assembly.

In the Assembly Corrêa de Oliveira served as a leading voice of the Catholic bloc, pressing for the LEC platform to be written into the 1934 Constitution. The resulting text incorporated the substance of the LEC's demands, including the civil effects of religious marriage, optional religious instruction in public schools, and the establishment of chaplaincies in the armed forces and penal institutions — an outcome historians have characterised as the principal political success of the neo-Christendom Catholic project in interwar Brazil. After his single legislative term Corrêa de Oliveira did not seek re-election, instead taking up academic appointments at the Law Faculty of the University of São Paulo and, subsequently, the chair of Modern and Contemporary History at the [[Pontifical Catholic University of São Paulo]], while continuing his work in lay Catholic organisations.

=== Catholic Action presidency and In Defense of Catholic Action ===
From 1935 Corrêa de Oliveira directed the São Paulo archdiocesan weekly O Legionário, which under his editorship grew from a parish bulletin into one of Brazil's most influential Catholic newspapers and the platform for a circle of traditionalist intellectuals — including the future bishops Antônio de Castro Mayer and Geraldo de Proença Sigaud — who would form the nucleus of his later organisational work. During the late 1930s and the wartime years the paper combined an uncompromising defence of Catholic orthodoxy with vigorous editorial opposition to Nazism and Italian fascism, at a time when sympathy for the European fascist regimes was not uncommon among segments of the Brazilian elite and clergy. Articles he had published in the early 1930s in the Rio-based journal A Ordem, by contrast, contained polemical writings on Jews that have been examined critically by historians of Brazilian Catholic thought.

In 1940 Corrêa de Oliveira was appointed the first president of the Archdiocesan Board of Catholic Action in São Paulo. From this position he became increasingly critical of what he regarded as the penetration of progressive and modernist currents into the Brazilian lay apostolate, associated above all with the influence of the French Catholic philosopher Jacques Maritain. He set out his critique in In Defense of Catholic Action (Em Defesa da Ação Católica), published in 1943 with a preface by the Apostolic Nuncio to Brazil, Benedetto Aloisi Masella.

The book was poorly received within an episcopate that was itself shifting toward the currents Corrêa de Oliveira had attacked. The death of Cardinal Leme in 1942 had already weakened his standing in the hierarchy, and following the appointment of a more progressive archbishop in São Paulo in 1944 he lost the presidency of the Archdiocesan Board of Catholic Action; in 1947 he was removed from the editorship of O Legionário. These dismissals inaugurated what historians have described as a long period of ecclesiastical marginalisation, during which Corrêa de Oliveira and his closest collaborators operated outside the institutional structures of the Brazilian church.

== Years of marginalisation (1944–1960) ==
=== Aftermath of the loss of Catholic Action and Legionário ===
The dismissals of 1944 and 1947 inaugurated a phase of relative ecclesiastical isolation for Corrêa de Oliveira and his closest collaborators, who continued their traditionalist project largely outside the institutional structures of the São Paulo archdiocese. His academic appointments at the Law Faculty of the University of São Paulo and at the Pontifical Catholic University of São Paulo provided him with an institutional base from which to continue his intellectual production, while the core group of writers he had assembled at O Legionário remained closely associated with him in an overlapping set of intellectual and devotional networks.

During the late 1940s the currents within Brazilian Catholic Action that Corrêa de Oliveira had criticised in In Defense of Catholic Action continued to gain ground, particularly through the rapid expansion of specialised branches of Catholic Action oriented toward university students, workers, and rural populations. Corrêa de Oliveira and his associates interpreted these developments as a confirmation of their earlier warnings and began to seek alternative ecclesiastical platforms from which to pursue what they regarded as the doctrinal defence of Catholic orthodoxy.

=== Catolicismo and the Castro Mayer–Sigaud alliance ===
The principal new platform took shape with the founding of the monthly journal Catolicismo in January 1951, published in Campos dos Goytacazes — the see of Castro Mayer, who had been appointed coadjutor bishop of Campos in 1948 and become diocesan bishop in 1949. Together with Proença Sigaud, appointed bishop of Jacarezinho in 1947 and later archbishop of Diamantina from 1961, Castro Mayer and Corrêa de Oliveira used Catolicismo as the principal vehicle for a traditionalist current within Brazilian Catholicism increasingly defined by its opposition to liturgical reform, ecumenical openings, agrarian reform, and the philosophical influence of Jacques Maritain.

Throughout the 1950s the Catolicismo circle developed both an organisational and an ideological infrastructure that would underpin the later founding of the TFP, drawing in a younger generation of recruits — many of them university students from elite Paulista families — and consolidating a recognisable traditionalist current within Brazilian lay Catholicism. Corrêa de Oliveira's own intellectual production of this period culminated in his most influential work, Revolution and Counter-Revolution (Revolução e Contra-Revolução), which first appeared as a long essay in Catolicismo in April 1959 before being issued in book form later that year. The text offered a comprehensive philosophy of history in which the Protestant Reformation, the French Revolution, and twentieth-century Communism were interpreted as successive phases of a single revolutionary process aimed at the destruction of Christian civilisation, and would serve as the doctrinal framework for the network of organisations to emerge from the Catolicismo group in the following decades.

== Activism ==
He assumed the chair of Modern and Contemporary History at the Pontifical Catholic University of São Paulo. He was also the first president of the São Paulo Archdiocesan Board of Catholic Action. Corrêa de Oliveira became concerned with what he saw as progressivist deviations within Brazilian Catholic Action, associated with the ideas of the French Catholic philosopher, Jacques Maritain and attacked these changes in his 1943 book, In Defense of Catholic Action.

With the arrival of a new archbishop in São Paulo in 1944, Corrêa de Oliveira lost his position as diocesan head of Catholic Action and in 1947 his directorship of the Catholic weekly Legionário, which he had supervised since 1935. In 1951 he founded the magazine O Catolicismo, together with the conservative bishops Antônio de Castro Mayer and Geraldo de Proença Sigaud. From 1968 to 1990 he wrote a column for the Folha de S.Paulo, the city's largest daily newspaper.

Corrêa de Oliveira's Catholic social activism found new targets with the advent of the National Conference of Bishops of Brazil (founded in 1952) and the Latin American Episcopal Conference (CELAM) (founded in 1955) supporting liberation theology, and also with the Cuban revolution of 1959. To put his ideas into action, he founded the Brazilian Society for the Defence of Tradition, Family and Property (TFP) in 1960.

Corrêa de Oliveira travelled to Rome for the opening session of Vatican II, describing it as "a point in history as sad as the Death of Our Lord" in which the Church was faced by the generalized, co-ordinated, and audacious action of its internal enemies. Oliveira was accompanied by members of the Brazilian TFP who brought twenty trunks of TFP literature. During the first session of the Council Oliveira provided a secretariat which served Brazilian bishops Antônio de Castro Mayer and Geraldo de Proença Sigaud and other bishops of the traditional faction, who ultimately formed the Coetus Internationalis Patrum. Corrêa de Oliveira's opposition to the direction of the Council continued, and in a 1976 addendum to his book, Revolution and Counter-Revolution, he described Vatican II as "one of the greatest calamities, if not the greatest, in the history of the Church". His strong opposition led to him being described by liberal critics as a "revanchist" within the ultra-traditional faction. However Plinio and those bishops drifted apart, as not all of them demonstrated loyalty to the Pope, while Corrêa de Oliveira did.

He served as president of the Brazilian TFP's national council until his death in 1995. His treatise, Revolution and Counter-Revolution, inspired the founding of autonomous TFP groups in nearly 20 countries worldwide. An admirer of Thomas Aquinas, he was the author of 15 books and over 2,500 essays and articles.

=== Hermits of San Bento ===
Oliveira held his ultimate goal to be the creation of a Religious Order of Chivalry. Oliveira began organizing said order in the 1960s, under the name “Hermits of San Bento”. Oliveira believed this religious order would be the commando force of the TFP in an impending worldwide Catholic uprising.

=== Antisemitism ===
He expressed suspicion about the role and social influence of Jews as a group. Several of his articles in A Ordem (The Order) from the early 1930s expressed views that Jews had amassed "vast wealth and, therefore, decisive influence on business affairs," and that Jews were among the founders of Communism. Corrêa de Oliveira wrote that the Jews, who unlike the Communists were not under surveillance by Brazilian security forces, could therefore be much more dangerous.

== Works ==
=== In the original Portuguese ===
- Em Defesa da Ação Católica, 1943.
- Revolução e Contra-Revolução, 1959.
- Acordo com o regime comunista: Para a Igreja, esperança ou autodemolição?, 1963.
- Reforma Agraria: Questão de Consciência, 1964.
- Declaração do Morro Alto: Programa de política agrária conforme os princípios de "Reforma Agrária - Questão de Consciência", 1964.
- Baldeação ideológica inadvertida e Diálogo, 1965.
- IDOC e Grupos Proféticos: Em ascensão triunfal - A Heresia Modernista, 1969.
- A Igreja ante a escalada da ameaça comunista Apelo aos Bispos Silenciosos, 1976.
- Tribalismo indígena, ideal comuno-missionário para o Brasil no século XXI, 1977.
- Sou Católico: posso ser contra a reforma agrária?, 1981.
- Nobreza e elites tradicionais análogas nas Alocuções de Pio XII ao Patriciado e à Nobreza romana, 1993.

=== Translated into English ===
- Nobility and Analogous Traditional Elites in the Allocutions of Pius XII: A Theme Illuminating American Social History, 1993.
- Revolution and Counter-Revolution, first published in 1974; 3rd edn. (the most recent) pub. 2014; 2002 digital edition.

== See also ==
- José Ortega y Gasset
- Joseph de Maistre
- Nicolás Gómez Dávila
- Olavo de Carvalho
- Traditionalist School
