= João Scognamiglio Clá Dias =

Brazilian priest and religious writer (1939–2024)

The Very Reverend Monsignor João Scognamiglio Clá Dias EP T.OCarm
- Superior General of the Heralds of the Gospel
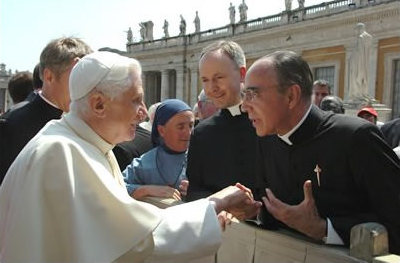
- Clá Dias (right) with Pope Benedict XVI in 2009

Orders
- Ordination: 2004 (priest)

Personal details
- Born: 15 August 1939 São Paulo, Brazil
- Died: 1 November 2024 (aged 85) Franco da Rocha, São Paulo, Brazil

João Scognamiglio Clá Dias (15 August 1939 – 1 November 2024) was a Brazilian Catholic priest, religious writer and founder of the Heralds of the Gospel, serving as their superior general until his resignation in 2017. Clá Dias joined the Marian Congregation of the Third Order Carmelites in 1956, and was ordained a priest in 2004.

In 2008 he was made honorary canon of the Papal Basilica of St. Mary Major in Rome, by Pope Benedict XVI. A year latter he also received the Pro Ecclesia et Pontifice Golden Cross for his services to the Church. He died in 2024, in Brazil, at the age of 85.

== Biography ==
=== Early life and studies ===
Dias was the son of a Spanish father, António Clá Díaz, born in Ceuta, and Annita Scognamiglio, born in São Paulo to Italian immigrant parents. He studied law at the Faculty of the Largo de São Francisco, in São Paulo. He had degrees in philosophy and theology at the Italian-Brazilian Universitarian Center, of São Paulo. He also was licentiated in Humanities by the Pontifícia Universidad Católica Madre y Maestra, of the Dominican Republic, a Master in Canon Law by the Pontifício Instituto de Direito Canônico of Rio de Janeiro, and a Doctorate in Canon Law by the Pontifical University of St. Thomas Aquinas, in Rome. Dias joined the Marian Congregation of the Third Carmelite Order in 1956, and was ordained a priest in 2004.

=== Heralds of the Gospel ===
Throughout the 20th century, Clá Dias was involved in several Catholic apostolates in Brazil. He decided to found the Heralds of the Gospel, a religious order, on 21 September 1999 and it was recognized on 22 February 2001 as an International Association of Pontifical Right by the Holy See. In 2005, he decided that the Heralds should include priests in their ranks. He, along with some other leading members of the Heralds, were ordained to the priesthood.

On 14 September 2008, Pope Benedict XVI nominated Fr. Clá Dias as the Honorary Canon of the Papal Basilica of St. Mary Major in Rome and gave him the honorary title of "Monsignor". In recognition of Clá Dias' long and dedicated service to the Church, on 15 August 2009, Pope Benedict XVI awarded him the Pro Ecclesia et Pontifice Golden Cross.

He was superior general of the Heralds until his resignation on 2 June 2017.

=== Death ===
On 1 November 2024, Monsignor João Scognamiglio Clá Dias died peacefully in Franco da Rocha, São Paulo, Brazil. He was 85.

== Works ==
Dias published several books, including O Inédito sobre os Evangelhos (2013-2016), in 7 volumes, translated into English as New Insights on the Gospels, and his biography of Plinio Corrêa de Oliveira, O Dom de Sabedoria na Mente, Vida e Obra de Plinio Corrêa de Oliveira (2016), in 5 volumes.
