= Caieiras =

Municipality in the state of São Paulo in Brazil

- Municipality
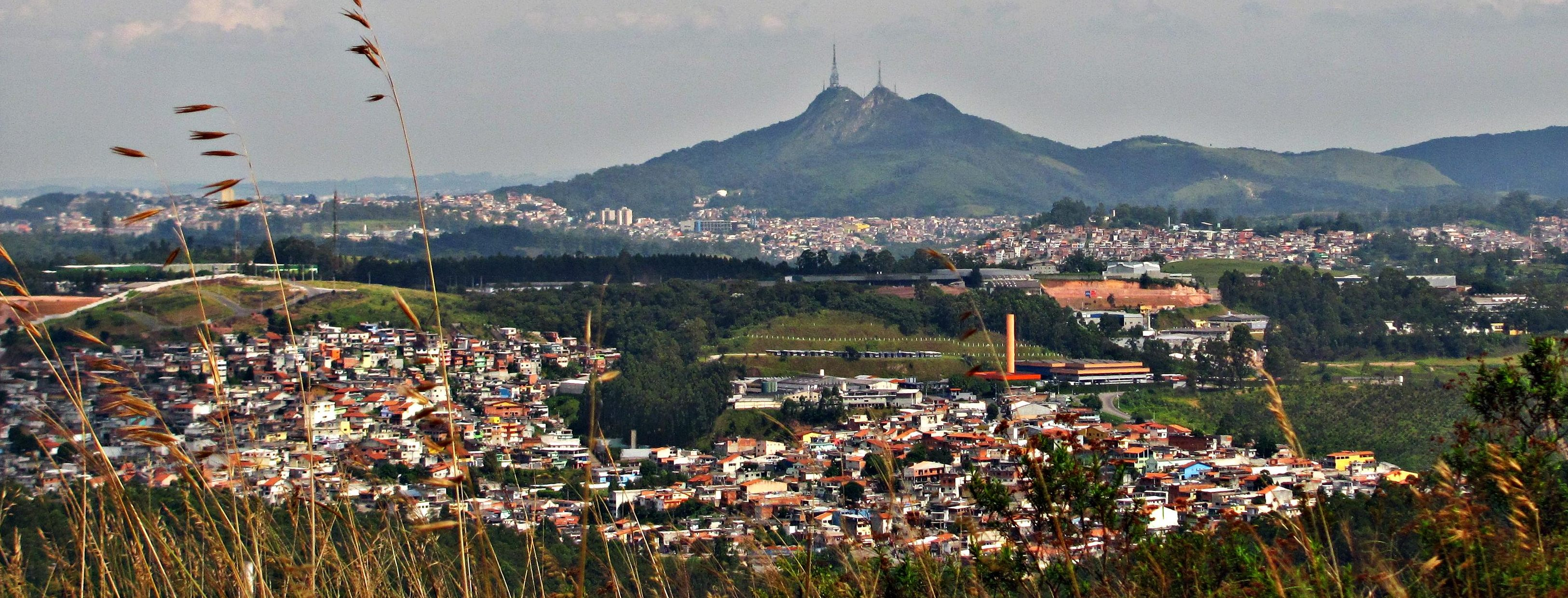

- Flag Coat of arms

- Location of Caieiras

- Location of Caieiras
- Coordinates: 23°21′52″S 46°44′27″W
- Country: Brazil
- Region: Southeast
- State: São Paulo
- Metropolitan Region: São Paulo
- Established: 1958

Government
  - Prefect: Gilmar Soares Vicente

Area
  - Total: 97.64 km^{2} (37.70 sq mi)

Population (2020)
  - Total: 102,775
  - Density: 1,053/km^{2} (2,726/sq mi)
- Demonym: Caieirense
- Time zone: UTC−3 (BRT)

Caieiras is a municipality in the state of São Paulo in Brazil. It is part of the Metropolitan Region of São Paulo. The population is 102,775 (2020 est.) in an area of 97.64 km^{2}. Due to the municipality's large reforestation area, it is known as the "City of the Pines".

The municipality contains part of the 7,917 hectares (19,560 acres) Cantareira State Park, created in 1962, which protects a large part of the metropolitan São Paulo water supply.

The municipality is served by CPTM Line 7 (Ruby).

== Demography ==
=== Demographics ===
Historical population (municipality)
| Year | Population | %± |
|---|---|---|
| 1960 | 9,405 | — |
| 1970 | 15,563 | 65.5% |
| 1980 | 25,156 | 61.6% |
| 1991 | 39,069 | 55.3% |
| 2000 | 71,221 | 82.3% |
| 2010 | 86,529 | 21.5% |
| 2022 | 95,032 | 9.8% |

== Economy ==
The economy of the city is based on paper industry. Most of the territory of the town consists of reforesting areas belonging to Companhia Melhoramentos de São Paulo.

== Media ==
In telecommunications, the city was served by Telecomunicações de São Paulo. In July 1998, this company was acquired by Telefónica, which adopted the Vivo brand in 2012. The company is currently an operator of cell phones, fixed lines, internet (fiber optics/4G) and television (satellite and cable).

== See also ==
- List of municipalities in São Paulo
