= Costumes in commedia dell'arte =

Costumes in theatrical genre

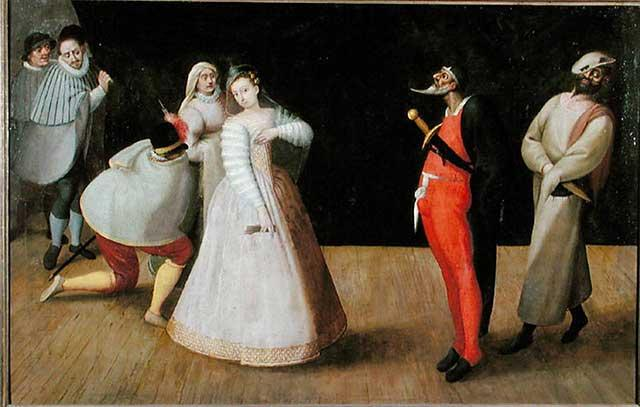
Commedia dell'arte troupe I Gelosi performing, by Hieronymus Francken I, c. 1590. Pantalone is second from right.

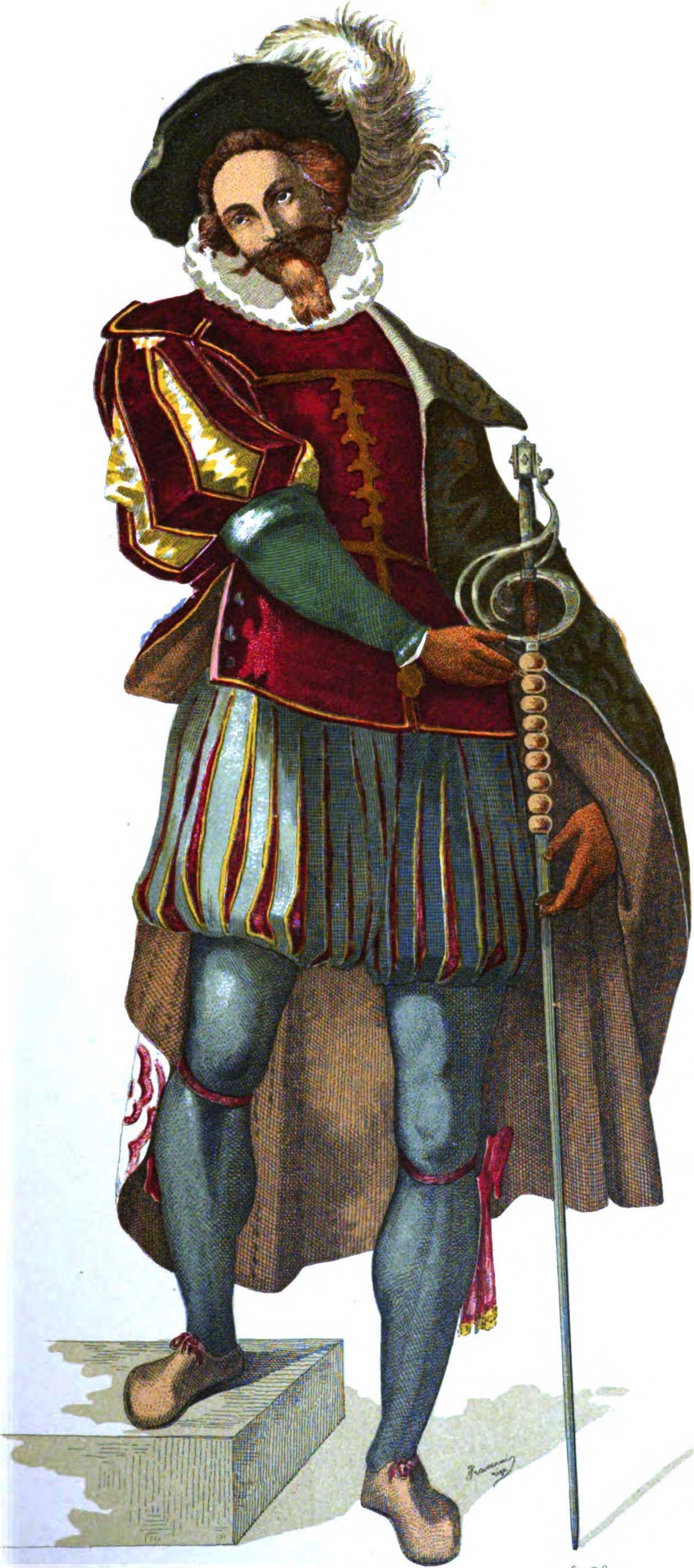
Il Capitano

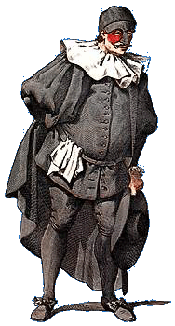
Il Dottore

Each character in commedia dell'arte is distinctly different, and defined by their movement, actions, masks, and costumes. These costumes show their social status and background.

Pantalone typically wore tight red pants and a matching shirt, a long black cape, black or red pointed shoes, and a belt that had a purse attached. Pantalone also carried a knife and handkerchief, and wore glasses. His hat sat very close to his head, and did not have a brim—very much like a skullcap. He might also wear a codpiece.

Il Dottore was dressed almost entirely in black—shoes, pants, shirt, robe, belt, and hat—broken only by a white handkerchief, white ruffled collar, white cuffs on his sleeves, or maybe white socks. The pants came to his knees, as did the full cloak that stood out, like a dress with a petticoat. His hat could either be small and look like a skullcap, or larger and floppy with a wide brim.

Il Capitano did not have a consistent dress code, but he did have a consistent costume theme. He wore the current soldiers' outfit from a foreign country. Sometimes his clothes were slashed to show that he had been in battle. His hat was overdone and typically had large feathers sticking out of it. Ribbons and shiny buttons often cluttered his clothes. He always carried a sword, and in the 17th century the sword upgraded to a gun. Every il Capitano costume also included a coat or cloak, that he could fling off in a moment of rage or passion.

Innamorati wore whatever was the latest fashion. They wore a lot of makeup, but tastefully done to match the elaborate outfits. They never wore masks.

Pulcinella always had white baggy pants and shirt, large buttons on the shirt, and a piece under his garments that made his belly appear very large. His clothes were held on by a rope belt, where a dagger and purse would hang. A humpback piece was sometimes used. He also wore a mask that depicted a large, sometimes broken nose. His hat was short and fluffy.

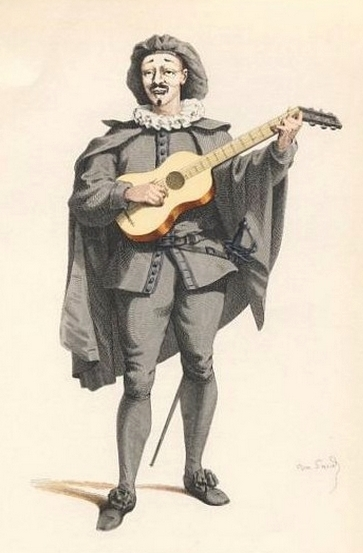
Scaramouche

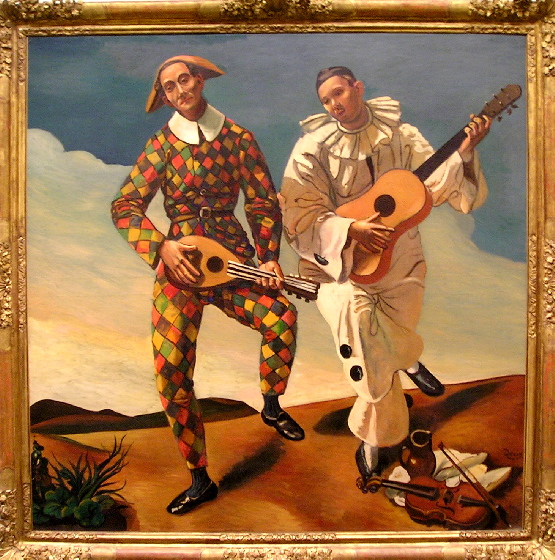
Harlequin in diamonds, and Pierrot in white

Harlequin's costume has varied over time. At first, in the mid 16th century, his clothes were light colored and baggy, with red, yellow, and green patches with no particular pattern. His facial hair suggested a younger man for a few years, but then a fuller beard was worn later. He had a black mask and a feathered white hat. About a hundred years later, his signature outfit changed to include white stripes and colored diamonds, or triangles instead of patches. For the next 200 years, the suit got tighter, and a black belt was added. He wore a hat with two points, and his clothes had lots of sparkles. By the 20th century, all the sparkles, collar ruffles, and large fancy hats were gone. Harlequin wore a very small hat, the mask was sometimes swapped out for a face-painted diamond, and the costume pattern became entirely made up of diamonds with a small bow or collar.

Brighella wore a servant's suit of rough off-white fabric, trimmed with green on the sides of his pants and down the front of his long shirt. His mask had a hooked nose, beard, and mustache. His dagger was worn at his belt.

Coviello had a lighter beige mask with a large nose, and his white costume had bells attached.

Mezzetino wore servant's clothes with red stripes, but without the common servant's mask.

Zanni was the main servant, who wore large loose pants and a shirt that had a hood.

Scapino wore outfits with white and green stripes, and his mask had a hooked nose and pointed beard.

Pierrot had loose white clothing, with a large matching collar. He painted his face white instead of wearing a mask.

Pedrolino's costume was essentially like Pierrot's—white, big buttons, short hat, and white face—but it was way too big for him, and the sleeves covered his hands, to emphasize that Pedrolino was a little person in hand-me-downs.

Peppe Nappa copied Pierrot's clothes, but wore them in blue instead of white.

Columbine's costume reflected her current master's, but included an apron. She wore no mask, but instead a bonnet, and her skirts were of different colors.

Scaramouche wore black clothes without a mask. Defiant eyebrows and a powdered face accompanied the large black mustache. He had a white collar, and a large loose hat that hung down over his neck.

Tartaglia wore a black hat and very thick glasses.

Rosetta was Pulcinella's maid or wife, who wore a dress with patches, like the early Harlequin.

Trivelino was a Zanni who dressed in the Harlequin fashion.

== See also ==
- Commedia dell'arte
- Theatre of Italy
