= L'Orfeide =

Opera by Gian Francesco Malipiero

L'Orfeide is an opera composed by Gian Francesco Malipiero who also wrote the Italian libretto, partly based on the myth of Orpheus and incorporating texts by Italian Renaissance poets. The work consists of three parts – La morte delle maschere (The death of the masks), Sette canzoni (Seven songs), and Orfeo, ovvero L'ottava canzone (Orpheus, or The eighth song). It received its first complete performance on 5 November 1925 at the Stadttheater in Düsseldorf.

== Background and performance history ==
Stadttheater in Düsseldorf where L'Orfeide received its world premiere in 1925

Although it is often referred to as a trilogy (or an operatic triptych), Malipiero himself described the work as one opera in three parts, with parts I and II also able to be performed independently. L'Orfeide was composed between 1918 and 1922. The first part to be composed, and what would eventually become Part II of the complete work, was Sette Canzoni, composed by Malipiero between 1918 and 1919. However, according to Waterhouse (1999), Malpiero's correspondence indicates that he had originally conceived Sette Canzoni as a stand-alone work, rather than as the central panel of a triptych. Sette Canzoni premiered at the Palais Garnier in Paris on 10 July 1920 in French translation by Henry Prunières as Sept chansons, conducted by Gabriel Grovlez. The strangeness of its music and dramatic structure and its deliberate break with the verismo style popular at the time caused an uproar at the premiere which nearly drowned out the performance.

In 1919, Malipiero started composing Orfeo, ovvero L'ottava canzone, which was to become Part III, and finished it shortly before the premiere of Sette canzoni. Part I, La morte delle maschere was the last to be composed and was completed in 1922. The world premiere of L'Orfeide in its entirety took place on 5 November 1925 at the Stadttheater in Düsseldorf. The performance, conducted by Erik Orthmann, used a German translation of Malipiero's libretto by Erik Orthmann and Willi Aron. Later complete performances of the work included its Italian premiere at La Fenice in Venice (1936) and the Teatro della Pergola in Florence (1966).

Performances of the complete trilogy are rare. However, there have been a considerable number of performances of Part II, Sette canzoni, considered one of Malipiero's masterpieces. It premiered in the United States in 1925 in a concert performance organized by the League of Composers at the Forty-Eighth Street Theatre in New York City. In Italy it was first performed in Turin in 1926 (in a double bill with Ravel's L'heure espagnole); in Rome in 1929 (in a double bill with Puccini's Gianni Schicchi); and in Florence in 1948 (in a triple bill with Donizetti's Il campanello and a ballet based on Cocteau's Les Maries de la Tour Eiffel). It received its British staged premiere at the King's Theatre in Edinburgh in 1969 (in a double bill with Dallapiccola's Il prigioniero) for the 23rd Edinburgh Festival. An unusual version of the work performed entirely by marionettes with recorded voices was premiered by the Gran Teatrino "La Fede delle Femmine" at La Fenice as part of the 1993 Venice Biennale.

== Synopsis and roles ==
=== Part I. La morte delle maschere ===
Roles

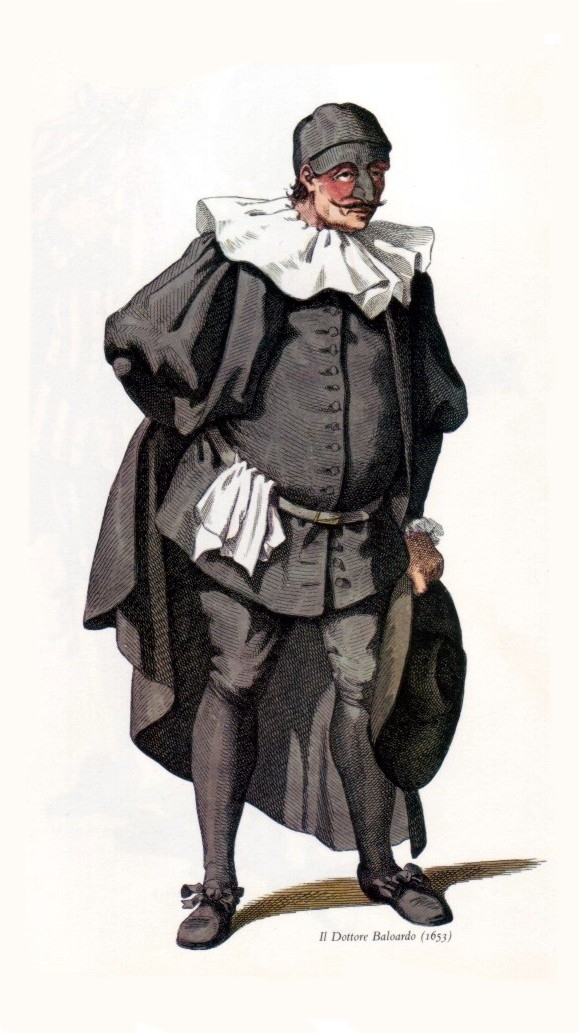
Traditional costume of the commedia dell'arte character, Dottore Balanzon

Apart from the impresario and Orfeo, the roles are those of the standard commedia dell'arte characters, all of whom traditionally performed in masks. The Italian word "maschera" (mask) is also used to denote a commedia dell'arte player.

- Impresario (narrator, spoken role)
- Arlecchino (tenor),
- Brighella (baritone),
- Dottor Balanzon (baritone)
- Capitan Spaventa di Valle Inferna (bass)
- Pantalone (baritone)
- Tartaglia (tenor)
- Pulcinella (tenor)
- Orfeo (tenor)

Synopsis

An impresario presents a performance of his commedia dell'arte troupe. The performance is interrupted when a man dressed in red, wearing a frightening mask and brandishing a whip, bursts in and scatters the players. The impresario flees as the masked stranger locks all seven players in a large cupboard. To the sounds of protest emanating from the cupboard, the masked man declares the death of the masks and their irrelevance to real life. He removes his own mask and costume and reveals himself to be Orpheus, exchanging the whip for his traditional lyre. Orpheus then introduces seven new characters who will be better representatives of the human condition (and who will become the main characters of Part II, Sette canzoni). They file silently onto and off the stage as the commedia dell'arte players protest from the cupboard that they will starve to death. Arlecchino manages to escape from the cupboard exclaiming, "It will never be true that Arlecchino will die of hunger" ("Non sarà mai vero che Arlecchino muoia di fame"). The curtain falls as Arlecchino scampers off-stage.

=== Part II. Sette canzoni ===
The seven songs in this part (which lasts 40 minutes in all) are designed as individual mini-operas. They are themed musically, but do not form a connected narrative. Malipiero claimed that each was inspired by an incident that he had observed.

1. Il vagabondo (The vagabond) – A story-teller convinces a young girl to abandon her blind companion. This was suggested to Malipiero by a group of vagabonds he once encountered in Venice, a crippled man who played the violin, a blind man who played the guitar, and a young woman who served as a guide for the blind man. They always played badly and always in the darkest, most out of the way streets. One day, he encountered the blind man alone, desperately playing his guitar. His companion had run off with the crippled violinist.

Roles: Il cantastorie (the story-teller), (baritone); Una giovane donna (a young woman), (soprano); Il cieco (the blind man), (tenor); passers-by (mimed)

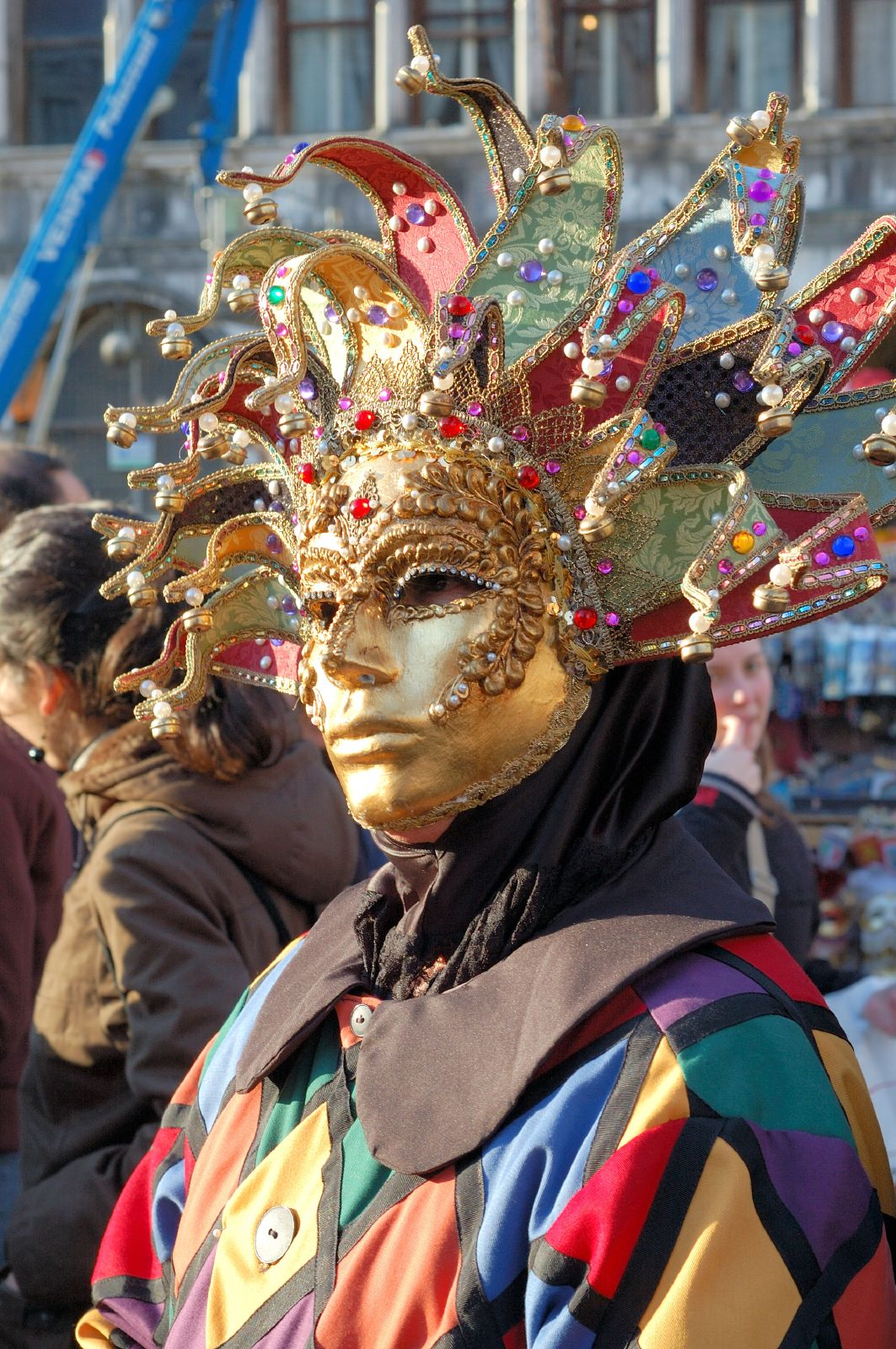
A modern-day masked harlequin at the Carnival of Venice. On the eve of Ash Wednesday, a mock funeral is held to mark the death of the carnival and the beginning of Lent – the subject of the 7th song, L'alba delle ceneri.

2. A vespro (At Vespers) – A chorus of friars is heard intoning the Vespers. Another friar, impatient to lock up the church for the night, interrupts a woman in prayer by rattling his keys and ultimately tapping her on the shoulder and pointing to the door. Malipiero witnessed a similar incident at the Chiesa di Sant'Agostino in Rome.

Roles: Il frate (the friar), (mimed); old woman (mimed)

3. Il ritorno (The return) – An old woman is driven mad by worry for her son who is away at war. So much so that when he returns, she fails to recognize him. Malpiero recalls passing by a house at the foot of Monte Grappa outside Venice, where he used to hear an old woman weeping, screaming, singing lullabies, and cradling a doll. Her son had been killed in World War I and she had become mad with grief.

Roles: La vecchia madre (the old mother), (soprano); young passers-by (chorus); her son (mimed)

4. L'ubriaco (The drunkard) – A man runs away from his lover's house chased by her elderly husband. In his flight he knocks over a drunkard who had been singing on the steps of the house. The husband mistakes the drunkard for his wife's lover and savagely beats him with his cane. This episode was inspired by Malipiero's observations of drunkards in Venice interrupting romantic encounters.

Roles: L'ubriaco (the drunkard), (bass or baritone); a young man in love (mimed); a young woman (mimed); old man (mimed)

5. La serenata (The serenade) – A man serenades his beloved outside her house. Unbeknownst to him, she is weeping by the body of a dead relative and is not listening to his song. This episode was inspired by Malipiero's observations of the contrast between Venetian serenades and laments for the dead.

Roles: L'innamorato (the man in love), (tenor); young woman (mimed)

6. Il campanaro (The bellringer) – As a man rings the church bells to warn the townspeople of a terrible fire, he sings a ribald song, seemingly indifferent to the impending disaster. This episode was inspired by a funeral which Malipiero had attended in Ferrara. He heard the bellringer whistling "La donna è mobile" as he rang the funeral toll.

Roles: Il campanaro (the bell-ringer) (baritone)

7. L'alba delle ceneri (The dawn of Ash Wednesday) – In a small town, a lamplighter extinguishes the street lamps as a funeral carriage passes by accompanied by penitents calling people to prayer. A troupe of masked clowns are dancing in the street and momentarily block the carriage. A mysterious figure symbolizing death appears and they scatter. One of clowns loses his cap in the melee. Once the procession has passed, he cautiously returns to retrieve it and in the process meets a young masked woman returning from the carnival. The two go off together. Malipiero wrote that this scene reflects the relief he always felt when Ash Wednesday liberated him from the "invasive banality" of the carnival season. One of the traditions of the carnival in several countries, including Italy, is a symbolic funeral on the eve of Ash Wednesday to mark the "death" of the carnival.

Roles: Il lampionaio (the lamplighter), (tenor or baritone); penitents (chorus); religious old women (mimed); clowns (mimed); young masked woman (mimed)

=== Part III. Orfeo, ovvero L'ottava canzone ===
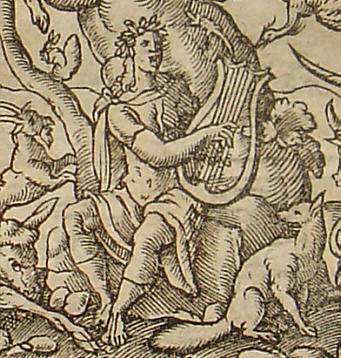
16th century depiction of Orpheus calming the wild beasts with his song

Roles

- Orfeo (tenor)
- Il re, the king (baritone)
- La regina, the queen (soprano)
- Il cavaliere, a knight (tenor)
- Il bibitaro, a drinks seller (tenor)
- Agrippina (soprano)
- Nerone (baritone)
- Dama, a lady of the court (spoken role)
- Il carnefice, the executioner (spoken role)
- Mimed roles and chorus: servants, courtiers, spectators, boys, reactionary old men and their ladies.

Synopsis

Courtiers gather in a 14th-century theatre. A knight unsuccessfully tries to gain the attention of one of the ladies of the court. A drinks seller noisily hawks his wares. When the king and queen arrive, the performance begins. It is a bloodthirsty tale of ancient Rome sung by marionettes and involving Emperor Nero, his mother Agrippina, and an executioner. The king and queen and their aristocratic companions watch the drama impassively. Two other audiences are shown in separate areas of the stage, each in their own theatre – reactionary old men and their female companions in a luxurious baroque theatre who are indignant and outraged by the spectacle and a group of rowdy boys sitting on plain benches who thoroughly applaud the violence and demand more. At the end of the performance, Orpheus appears dressed as a clown. He congratulates the aristocrats on their passivity and then begins to sing, "Uscite o gemiti, accenti queruli, lamenti flebili..." ("Begone o groans, querelous words, languid laments..."). His song puts everyone to sleep except the queen who is fascinated by him. She and Orpheus escape together as the candles go out and the curtain comes down.

== Recordings ==
The only commercially released recording of the complete Orfeide (a remastered live recording of the 7 June 1966 performance at the Teatro della Pergola in Florence) was published in 1996 by the French company Tahra (Tah 190/191). Hermann Scherchen conducted the Maggio Musicale Fiorentino Orchestra with a cast that included Magda Olivero and Renato Capecchi. Scherchen fell during the performance, but still managed to conduct until the end. He was hospitalized after the performance, and died shortly after, the 12 June.

== Sources ==
- Casaglia, Gherardo (2005). "L'Orfeide, 5 November 1925". L'Almanacco di Gherardo Casaglia (in Italian).
- Chester Music, Gian Francesco Malipiero: L'Orfeide
- Cooke, Mervyn, The Cambridge Companion to Twentieth-century Opera, Cambridge University Press, 2005. ISBN 0-521-78009-8
- Courir, Duilio Nono, profeta in patria, Corriere della Sera, 14 June 1993, p. 14. Accessed 28 June 2009.
- Gatti, Guido Maggiorino (ed.), L'Opera di Gian Francesco Malipiero (essays by various authors and the catalogue of Malpiero's works with commentary and annotation by the composer), Edizioni di Treviso, 1952.
- Gelli, Piero (ed.), "Orfeide, L'", Dizionario dell'Opera, Baldini Castoldi Dalai, 2007, ISBN 88-6073-184-4. Accessed online 16 March 2009.
- Gulevich, Tanya, Encyclopedia of Easter, Carnival, and Lent, Omnigraphics, 2002. ISBN 0-7808-0432-5
- Malipiero, Gian Francesco, L'Orfeide (Libretto in the original Italian)
- Manfriani, Franco, Mito e contemporaneità, Edizioni Pendragon, 2007. ISBN 88-8342-547-2
- Oja, Carol J., Making Music Modern, Oxford University Press US, 2000. ISBN 0-19-505849-6
- Oliver, Michael E., Gian Francesco Malipiero: L'Orfeide, Gramophone, April 1997, Page 94. Accessed 28 June 2009.
- Sadie, Stanley, The New Grove Dictionary of Opera, Macmillan Press, 1992. ISBN 0-333-48552-1
- Warrack, John; West, Ewan (1996). "Orfeide, L'". The Concise Oxford Dictionary of Opera.
- Waterhouse, John C. G., La musica di Gian Francesco Malipiero, Nuova Eri, 1990. ISBN 88-397-0444-2
- Waterhouse, John C. G., Gian Francesco Malipiero (1882–1973): The life, times and music of a wayward genius, Taylor & Francis, 1999. ISBN 90-5702-210-9
