= Ramu kaka (character) =

Hindi literary character

Ramu kaka (Hindi: रामू काका), is a character type of Hindi literature and media. Similar to commedia dell'arte's Zanni, Ramu kaka is a servant. The Ramu kaka comes from the countryside and is a live-in manservant.

== Origin of the name ==
"Ramu" is a diminutive for "Ram", a common first name or partial first name in the Hindi heartland countryside, whence Ramu hails. "Kaka" literally means "uncle" and is a nod to the character's age and familiarity with the family.

== Characteristics ==
Ramu kaka is an aging, loyal, genial, live-in servant, fulfilling the roles of a butler and a valet. Often Ramu kaka has been with the family for decades, and occasionally generations.
