= Authority figures in comedy =

Comedy theme

A recurring theme in the literary, theatrical, and film tradition of comedy is the use of stock characters representing authority figures, designed to poke fun at officialdom by showing that its members are not immune to entanglement in the ridiculous. This is an old tradition, well illustrated in works such as Chaucer's Canterbury Tales and Voltaire's Candide. This practice arises in part from the desire of those subject to the power of those in authority to use any available means of limiting this power by demonstrating that the authority figure is just as subject to mockery as those lacking power. This represents "the attempt to use aggression to protect oneself from engulfment, impingement or humiliation by diminishing the perceived power and threat of the other", an effort which often takes the form of caricature of those in authority.

This theme was commonly used by the British comedy troupe, Monty Python. In their sketches, a "common comedic device was for authority figures (such as military officers, police, judges, Conservative politicians, BBC news announcers and even God) to take their characters to extremes by suddenly spouting complete nonsense".

Examples include:

- Police officers, as seen in Keystone Cops, Inspector Clouseau, Reno 911!, Police Academy, The Thin Blue Line and Carry On Constable.
- Soldiers, as seen in Sgt. Bilko, Carry on Sergeant, Stripes, Blackadder Goes Forth and Il Capitano in the Commedia dell'arte.
- Civil servants, as seen in Yes Minister, Carlton-Browne of the F.O., The Ministry of Silly Walks and Spin City.
- Priests, as seen in All Gas and Gaiters and Father Ted.
- Teachers, principals, and deans, as seen in Animal House and High School High.

Some television shows, such as South Park and The Simpsons, have a collection of characters that represent all of the main groups of authority figures, and each portrays such figures as humorously flawed. Indeed, each show has a resident police officer — Officer Barbrady and Chief Wiggum, respectively — portrayed as an incompetent and bumbling idiot. The shows also mockingly portray their resident religious leader — Priest Maxi in South Park and Reverend Timothy Lovejoy in The Simpsons. The shows also include, with slightly different characteristics, the flawed exercise of authority by parents, teachers, school principals, mayors, and occasionally soldiers and politicians.

Examples can also be found in the art of the Russian joke.
