= La Ruffiana =

Fictional character

La Ruffiana is an older female character of the Commedia dell'Arte with a shady past or who used to be a prostitute. She is used most often in relationship to the vecchi of which group she is a nominal member. Ruffiana is most often romantically involved with Pantalone, though his love may easily be unrequited if it suits the plot. She is generally described as being talkative/gossipy, sneaky, and mischievous, but deep down is actually kind. She has been described as an "outsider" that always mixes things up and causes trouble for the rest of the characters. "Her quips reek of garlic" (Pierre Louis Duchartre, The Italian Comedy p. 285)

== Roles in scenarios ==
Typically la Ruffiana is a former prostitute. While she is long retired, she still knows everything there is to know about the business. Because of this sometimes she is a counsel to some of the younger characters when it comes to romance. As a retired older character, she can fill the role of other shady characters in scenarios, such as a peasant or a woman who pursues younger men. When performed in the northern parts of Italy, specifically around Venice, she is portrayed as the gossipy townsperson. Whereas when we venture down south around Naples, she makes appearances as a midwife, or the older herb woman.

Another common role for la Ruffiana is a mysterious magical woman or gypsy. Most of the other characters in Commedia are not trusting or scared of sorceresses and gypsies because they are typically mischievous thieves. La Ruffiana is known to have spells, potions, and a vast amount of knowledge. She is also found to use her powers to see the future and to meddle in the younger characters love lives. While she is good at heart, she is still known to be a thief and should not be messed with.

== Etymology ==
La Ruffiana gets her name from the earlier Italian word "ruffiano", from which, via French, the English word "ruffian" also comes. A "ruffian" (first recorded in English in 1525) is "a boisterous, brutal fellow, one ready to commit any crime". In Italian "ruffiano" means "a pander, pimp". La Ruffiana is therefore also related to the procurer/old woman/pimp characters of ancient Latin comedy.

== Costume ==
La Ruffiana has been seen in various clothing options and styles depending on the direction that the character is being taken. Traditionally, she is seen in Neapolitan peasant clothing. She is also often seen in a cloak and a mask, which makes her one of the only woman Commedia dell'Arte characters to be played in a mask. She is also occasionally seen with a staff of some variety.
