= Giovanni Camillo Canzachi =

Italian actor

Giovanni Camillo Canzachi was an Italian actor, mainly performing Commedia dell'Arte.

He was born in Bologna and mainly active in the first half of the 18th century. he was renowned as the character wearing the mask of the Dottore. He was recruited to perform in Vienna for the court of Emperor Charles the VI. Fluent in many languages, he invented the spirited and comic character of the Italianized Frenchman. In 1740, while in Venice, he published a comedy titled l' Adulatore (The Adulater). His play was not popular locally. Disenchanted, he then moved to Dresden, to perform for the elector's court.

== Sources ==
- Boni, Filippo de' (1852). Biografia degli artisti ovvero dizionario della vita e delle opere dei pittori, degli scultori, degli intagliatori, dei tipografi e dei musici di ogni nazione che fiorirono da'tempi più remoti sino á nostri giorni. Seconda Edizione.. Venice; Googlebooks: Presso Andrea Santini e Figlio. p. 183.
