= Signora =

Signora (Italian, 'Mrs') may refer to:

- La Signora, a character in commedia dell'arte
- La Signora, a fictional character in Genshin Impact

== Other uses ==
- Mary, mother of Jesus
