= La Signora =

Fictional character

La Signora (Italian: [la siɲˈɲoːra]; lit. 'the Lady') is a character in commedia dell'arte. She is sometimes the wife of Pantalone and the mistress of Pedrolino. La Signora is tough, beautiful and calculating, and wears very wide dresses along with very heavy makeup. She walks with a flick of the toe and her arms held far out to the sides of her body.

La Signora could be a "courtesan" (high class prostitute), but typically manages to wrangle her way into the household of an old man, usually Pantalone, where she would inevitably cuckold him. She was an older, sexually experienced Columbine, known as Rosaura.

- Appearance: overdresses, wearing too many jewels, flowers, feathers and ribbons, and wearing too much hair and makeup.
- Physicality: like il Capitano, she uses excessive and big gestures.
- Character traits: main aim is satisfaction of physical needs – more jewels, dresses and sex. She will scheme to have them assured. She has an immediate attraction to her counterpart, il Capitano, and they must be together. However, she is married to Pantalone, and she cheats on him regularly.

A common lazzo of la Signora is to have a fight with another woman, as she is very proud and often ridicules others.

== Popular culture ==
Representations of or characters based on la Signora in contemporary popular culture include la Signora from Genshin Impact (where she is the Eighth of the Eleven Fatui Harbingers), and la Signora from the comic book series Power Man and Iron Fist, where she is a minor villain, part of the commedia della morte.
