= Vecchio =

Character archetype in commedia dell'arte

Vecchio (Italian: [ˈvɛkkjo]; pl.: vecchi; meaning 'old one' or simply 'old') is a category of aged, male characters from Italian commedia dell'arte theatre. The primary members of this group are Pantalone, il Dottore, and il Capitano. Pantalone and il Dottore are the alter ego of each other: Pantalone being the decadent wealthy merchant, and il Dottore being the decadent erudite.

They are overwhelmingly the antagonists, opposing the love of the innamorati; the comic ending is produced when the Zanni manage to overcome them and unite the lovers.

== See also ==
- Commedia dell'arte
