= Coviello =

Stock character that originated in commedia dell'arte

Coviello, by Callot

Coviello (French: Covielle) is a minor character in the commedia dell'arte. He falls into the category of the Zanni. His name is a double diminutive of the name Giacomo ('Jacob' or 'James'). In English, he might be called 'Jimmy' or 'Jackie'.

The character dates back to at least the 16th century. He was typically from the southern part of Italy, and could apparently dance and play the mandolin quite well.

His mask usually portrays him with a ridiculously long beak-like nose, often near as long as his whole face. His nose and cheeks are usually painted red. He sometimes wears glasses, and is frequently shown with plumes in his hat. Callot shows him dancing with a slapstick and a sword on his belt.

Niccolò Barbieri says that Coviello entertains the audience by his "grimaces and affected language". Salvator Rosa says that Coviello is "sly, adroit, supple, and conceited". In Molière's "The Bourgeois Gentleman" he disguises his master as a Turk and pretends to speak Turkish. He could apparently be stupid or clever, as the actor and scenario saw fit to portray him.

Likewise his costume could vary. He sometimes wears a skintight unitard, other times he is shown clothed in pants and a doublet. The nose and plumed hat seem to be his most consistent features.

== See also ==
- Commedia dell'arte

== Bibliography ==
- Rudlin, John; Oliver Crick (2001). Commedia dell'arte. Routledge. ISBN 978-0-415-20409-5.
