= Commedia dell'arte staging and staging practices =

Commedia dell'arte began in the 16th century. When it began, it was performed outside in piazzas, theatres, and public meeting halls and courts.

There were several indoor stages to choose from. With the rise in popularity of commedia also came the expansion of theatre technology. This new technology was not available to all commedia troupes, but when it was they often took advantage of it. Communities often made ways to aid these troupes in finding places to perform, converting private homes and town halls. When the troupes went to Europe, they used what theatres they could find and would also try to build new ones to continue aiding the art.

Outdoor stages were utilized by dramatizing the daily lives, where merchants had to try and get the people's attention from the stage. They often had a backdrop to show a general location. Some scholars debate the immense stigma and hatred generated by these troupes. This could have played a part in deterring people from performing in the street due to this stigma. This stigma grew so much that actress Isabella Andreini wrote to the governor of Milan complaining about them.

The earliest knowledge of commedia staging is when Ferdinand, a son of Albrecht V, Duke of Bavaria, went to Florence for a wedding.
