= Sandrone =

Character in Commedia dell'arte

Sandrone (Modenese dialect: Sandróun) is the traditional mask and character of the Commedia dell'arte representing the city of Modena. He is characterized as a cunning and crude peasant.

== Origin ==
Sandrone is represented as a peasant who is crude, clever, and cunning. He is seen as the spokesman of a humble people who are ill-treated, eternally hungry, and always using tricks to make ends meet. The character of his wife, Pulonia, appears in 1840, soon followed by a son, Sgorghiguelo. The three form what is known as the Pavironica family.

Initially, these characters were presented as puppets. Beginning in the late 19th century, the three were represented by male actors known as "the Pulonia". Dressed in a style of clothing popular around 1700, Sandrone sports a corduroy jacket, short corduroy pants, red and white cross-striped socks, a floral embroidered vest, and sturdy farmer's boots. He also wears a wig with long hair, partly covered by a white wool nightcap ending in a tassel.

His son (Sgorghiguelo) wears a wig and a reddish-brown cap with a visor. His wife (Pulonia) wears a white hat and an ankle length dress decorated with brightly colored flowers. She may also wear a white apron, black patent leather shoes with bright buckles, and a white wig with ringlets.

For over a century these three characters have been a symbol of Carnival in Modena. The tradition is kept alive by the Society of Sandrone. Every year, on the Thursday before Lent, Sandrone and his family arrive at the train station from the imaginary village of Bosco di Sotto ("Lower Wood"). From there, they parade to Piazza Grande where the crowd witnesses the traditional "sproloquio", a speech spoken in traditional Modenese dialect by the three from the balcony of Palazzo Comunale. The speech makes funny observations about city life and mocks the government in a lighthearted manner.
