= Zan Ganassa =

Early Italian theatre actor and manager (c. 1540–1584)

Zan Ganassa (Italian: [ˈdzaŋ ɡaˈnassa], Lombard: [ˈzaŋ ɡaˈnasa]; c. 1540 – c. 1584) was the stage name of an early actor-manager of commedia dell'arte, whose company was one of the first to tour outside Italy. Ganassa's real name was probably Alberto Naseli (also spelled Naselli).

He was known for playing Zanni, comic servant roles, hence his stage name, and is one of the first actors believed to have played the Zanni subtype known as Harlequin (Arlecchino in Italian), which subsequently became one of the most important leading roles in commedia dell'arte plays.

Ganassa is first mentioned in 1568 as the leader of a troupe in Mantua. After his troupe had performed in Paris in 1571, they were invited by Charles IX of France to take part of the festivities surrounding the marriage of the King of Navarre (later Henry IV) to Charles's sister Margaret of Valois in August 1572.

From 1574 to 1584 Ganassa performed in Spain during the reign of Philip II, where he exerted considerable influence on early Spanish professional theatre. He was so popular that the authorities in Seville withdrew the troupe's license: workers were neglecting their jobs in order to see the plays. Ganassa is mentioned numerous times by Lope de Vega, who may have based his comic servant gracioso on commedia dell'arte types. The gracioso later became a stock character of Spanish comedia.

During this period, it was common for theatre companies to set up their stages right before a performance and take down everything immediately after. Ganassa recognized what a burden this would be and donated to the city of Madrid to create a theatre known as Corral de la Pacheca, which is the first ever permanent theatre in Madrid. Ganassa guaranteed himself tenancy in this theatre by a 9–10-year lease from its owner, Isabel Pacheco, by persuading the Cofrades. Ganassa also donated again to the Cofrades in 1582 to help build the second permanent theatre space of Madrid, the Corral del Príncipe.
