= Tartaglia (commedia dell'arte) =

Stock fictional character

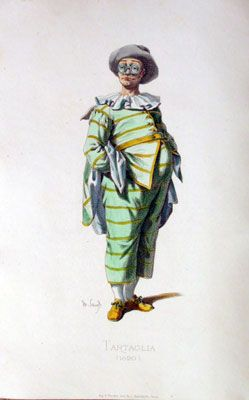
Maurice Sand, "Tartaglia the stutterer (1650)". Originally published in Masques et bouffons, une histoire illustrée de la comédie italienne (1862).

Tartaglia (lit. 'Stutterer') is a dainty character in the commedia dell'arte. He is farsighted and with a minor stutter (hence his name; cf. Spanish tartamudear), he is usually classed as one of the group of old characters (vecchio) who appears in many scenarios as one of the lovers (innamorati). His social status varies; he is sometimes a bailiff, lawyer, notary or chemist. Dramatist Carlo Gozzi turned him into a statesman, and so he remained thereafter. Tartaglia wears a large felt hat, an enormous cloak, oversized boots, a long sword, a giant moustache, and a cardboard nose. He usually represents the lower working class, but at times the middle or upper class in the commedia dell'arte.

Tartaglia comes from the southern, or Neapolitan, quartet of masks, along with Coviello, Scaramouche, and Pulcinella. In France, this mask did not become popular.

The Tartaglia mask appeared in Naples around 1610. Actors Ottavio Ferrarese and Beltrani da Verona became one of the first actors of it. The mask reaches its greatest popularity by the second half of the 17th century. In the 18th century, actors Agostino Fiorilli and Antonio Sacchi played this role in the plays of Gozzi, but for Gozzi this mask no longer has such a limited framework; in his plays this mask can be worn, for example, by the minister ("The Raven") and the royal son ("The Love of Three Oranges").

== Other fictional characters named Tartaglia ==
In the opera Le maschere by Pietro Mascagni, one of the servants is Tartaglia, whose aria (Quella è una strada) requires him to stutter.

In the opera Turandot by Ferruccio Busoni, one of the characters is Tartaglia, a minister.

There is a voluble Sgt. Gino Tartaglia, played by Charles Calvert, in the radio crime drama Broadway Is My Beat.

In the game Genshin Impact, the 11th of the Fatui Harbingers, who are all named after the commedia dell'arte, is known as Tartaglia (Chinese: 达达利亚) or Childe (Chinese: 公子), although his real name is Ajax.

== See also ==
- Commedia dell'arte
