= Il Capitano =

Stock fictional character in commedia dell'arte

Il Capitano (Italian: [il kapiˈtaːno]; lit. 'the Captain') is one of the four stock characters of commedia dell'arte. He most probably was never a "Captain", but rather appropriated the name for himself.

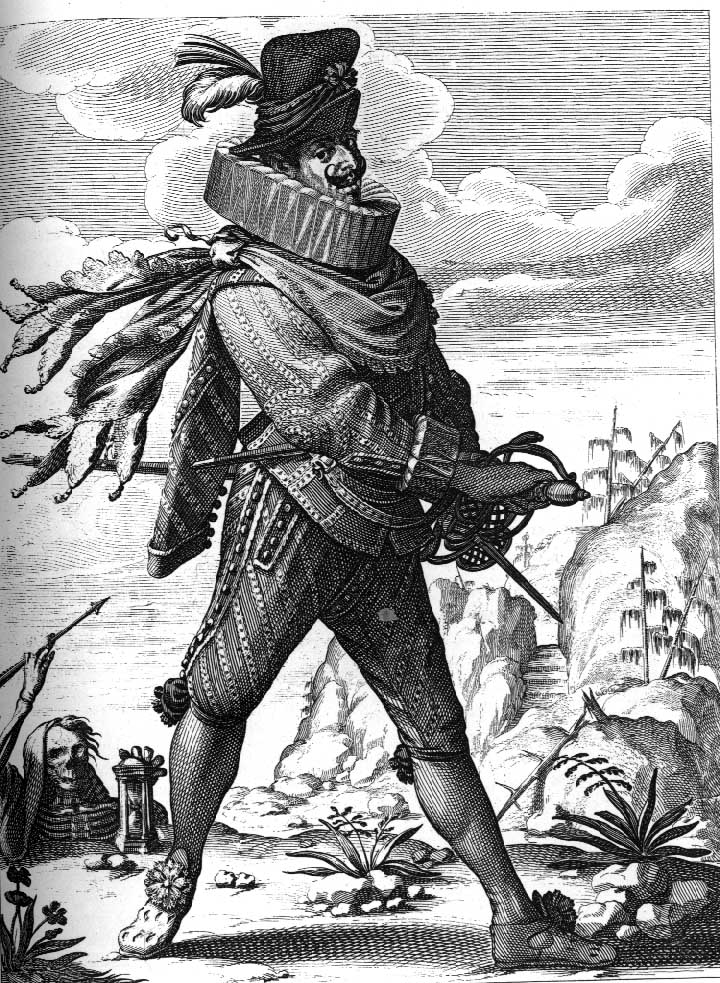
Il Capitano uses bravado and excessive shows of manliness to hide his true cowardly nature. Engraving by Abraham Bosse.

Its genesis dates back to the Pyrgopolinices of Titus Maccio Plautus' Miles gloriosus and to Terence's Thrason of the Eunuch. He was reborn in various forms in the Italian theater of the Renaissance. He usually personified the vainglorious soldier. He could boast of titles he did not possess or of feats he had never accomplished. In the most negative versions he actually poorly concealed the terror of having to face a battle or a duel. However, the Captains could also have positive characteristics, as dreamers with noble feelings.

An example of a captain portrayed in a more positive way is Francesco Andreini's Captain Spaventa; a captain portrayed in a more negative way is Captain Matamoros by Silvio Fiorillo. Several other types of Capitano exist. Inspired by the mask are numerous other variants such as Capitan Giangurgolo, Capitan Corazza, Capitan Cardone, Rinoceronte, Terremoto, Spezzaferro, Spaccamonti, Capitan Rodomonte. Numerous derivations of the mask adopted from the Neapolitan carnival or more generally from literature, such as Captain Fracassa, can also be traced back to the captain.

Il Capitano often talks at length about made-up conquests of both the militaristic and the carnal variety to impress others, but often ends up impressing only himself. He gets easily carried away in his tales and doesn't realize when those around him don't buy his act. He would be the first to run away from all battles, and he has trouble talking to and being around men. He is also extremely opportunistic and greedy. If hired by Pantalone to protect his daughter from her many suitors, il Capitano would set up a bidding war for his services or aid between the suitors and Pantalone while wooing her himself. If he is hired to fight the Turks, he will bluster about fighting them to his last drop of blood, but when the Turks seem to be winning, he will join them. He will change sides again when they are driven off and boast about his loyalty and bravery.

== Role ==
"I think of him as a peacock who has moulted all but one of his tail feathers, but does not know it", notes author John Rudlin. In this case, his cowardice is usually overcome by the fury of his passion, which he makes every effort to demonstrate. Typically, however, his cowardice is such that when one of the characters orders him to do something, he often steps down out of fear, but is able to make up an excuse that ensures the other characters still see him as a brave and fierce individual. Columbine sometimes uses him to make Harlequin (Arlecchino) jealous, much to il Capitano's bewilderment and fright.

=== Origin ===
The origin of il Capitano comes from 2 literary sources: Plautus's miles gloriosus and Terence's Eunuchus. The first famous Capitano, Capitan Spaventa, appeared in Francesco Andreini's Bravure di Capitan Spaventa ('The Boast of the Terrifying Captain').

=== Lazzi ===
1. Whenever il Capitano sees the audience, he stops to be admired.
2. Il Capitano gloats to Harlequin about his expertise with the ladies and then proceeds to demonstrate on Harlequin how he would make love to a woman.
3. He wakes up to find he is not the only one in the room. Someone is crouching in the corner. He shakes his fist at the person, the person shakes their fist back at the same time. It turns out the person in the room is just il Capitano's reflection in a full-length mirror.
4. When frightened, he often screams in a high and womanly falsetto, or else faints.

=== Stance ===
He stands in a high posture, occupying as much space as possible to make himself look more important, with a straight back and his chest pushed forward.

=== Plot function ===
To be exposed or 'de-masked'. He exists to be stripped of his excessive confidence and shown in a moment of panic and humility.

=== Famous actors ===
- Francesco Andreini
- Antonio Fava

== Description of the character ==
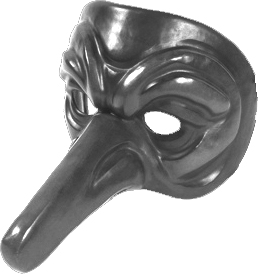

=== Mask ===
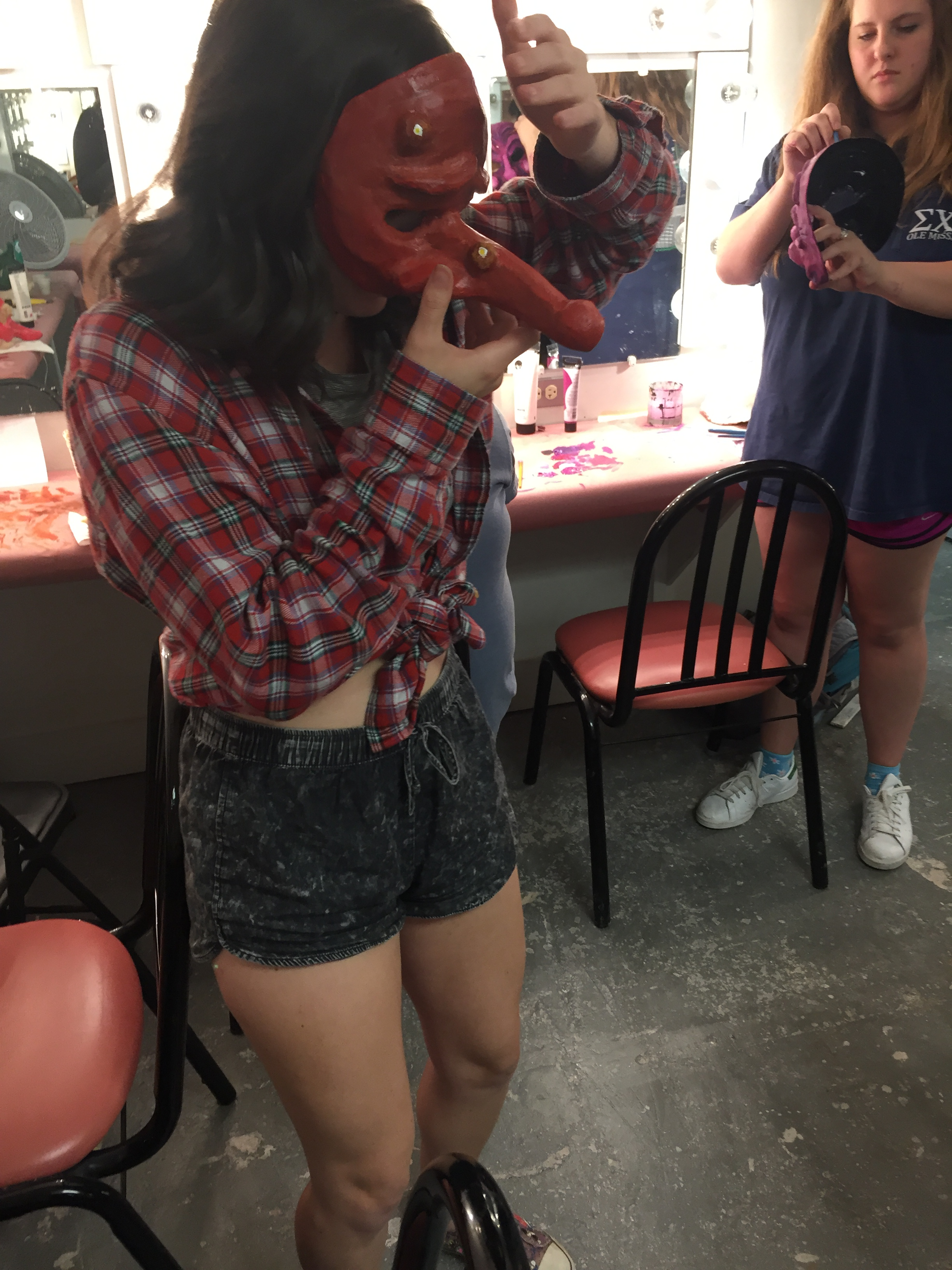
II Capitano mask being made at the University of Mississippi

His mask is described as having "a long nose, often unambiguously phallic". The nose for Capitan Spaventa's mask is fairly large, but it lengthens with Matamoros and becomes absolutely gargantuan for Coccodrillo. Originally, the color of the mask was probably flesh tone, now it can be many flamboyant colors such as bright pink, yellow, and light blue. The mask often has a strong mustache and brow lines that can be black or have a purple/blue tone.

=== Costume ===
Military-esque uniform (a satire on the period). The 1500s: feathered helmet or hat (mom panache), exaggerated garters, extraordinarily long sword and a plethora of ruffles. 1600s: coat, breeches, and he would mostly have a musket instead of a sword. In one famous scenario, il Capitano makes up a lie regarding the reason for his lack of an undershirt by claiming that it got that way because, "I used to be an exceedingly fierce and violent man, and when I was made angry the hair which covers my body in goodly quantity stood on end and so riddled my shirt with holes that you would have taken it for a sieve." The real reason is that he has become too poor to afford one. Sometimes he wears it with a helmet or a bicorne or tricorne hat with a huge plume. Spanish characters often wear an exaggerated large neck-ruff.

He is usually always wearing his trademarked sword. If he were to ever work up enough nerve to draw it, it is usually too long to draw easily or too heavy or wobbly to wield properly. Even if he cut somebody with it, he would faint at the very sight of the blood.

=== Noms de guerre ===
Il Capitano usually has a properly showy name for himself, preferably several lines long and followed by many made-up titles and lists of relations.

Some names are fierce-sounding, such as "Escobombardon" ("Fired out of a cannon"), "Rodomonte" ("Mountain-crumbler"), "Sangre y Fuego" (Spanish: "Blood and Fire"), "Spaccamonti" ("Mountain splitter"), "Spezzaferro" ("Iron-breaker"), or "Terremoto" ("Earthquake"). Some names are ironic, such as "Bellavista" ("Beautiful view", a vain but ugly man) or "Fracasso"/" Fracassa" (the correct masculine version and an invented feminine version for "Fracas", "Skirmish" or "Big noise").

Some are dismissive, such as "Cerimonia" ("Ceremony", all proper manners and rigid, slavish devotion to pointless details), "Coccodrillo" ("Crocodile", because he preys on others), "Fanfarone" ("Trumpeter" or "Loudmouth"), "Giangurgulo" ("John the Glutton"), "Grillo" ("Grasshopper", because he is small and 'hops' sides), "Malagamba" ("Lame leg"), "Squaquara" ("Little Shi"), "Papirotonda" ("Round letter", a complaint signed by mutinous soldiers or sailors in a circle around the main text so the ringleaders or originators cannot be discerned), "Tagliacantoni" ("Small-sized"), or "Zerbino" ("Doormat"). He is also prone to awarding himself ridiculous titles such as "Capitan Spaventa di Vall'Inferna" ("Captain Fear, (Lord) of Hell's Valley"; the name of Vall'Inferna also sounds similar to "Va' all'Inferno!", lit. '[When you die] Go to Hell!', an Italian-language imprecation), "Salvador de los Vírgenes Borrachos" (Spanish for "Savior of Drunken Virgins"), or "Sieur de Fracasse et Brise-tout" (French for "Lord of 'Knock it down' and 'Break everything'").

== Variants ==
The French coined characters such as Boudoufle (Norman French for 'Puffed up with hurt pride'), Taille-bras (either 'Limb-Cutter' or 'Arm's Length'), and Engoulevent (either 'Night-bird' or 'Big-mouth'). England has the Irish dramatist George Farquhar's play The Recruiting Officer. Major Bloodnok of The Goon Show bears some resemblance to il Capitano and shares many of his traits, such as lust, greed, and cowardice. In modern theater, the character miles gloriosus (Latin for 'Famous or Boastful Soldier') from A Funny Thing Happened on the Way to the Forum is an obvious form of the character, though modeled from the earlier Roman plays.

=== Types ===
1. Capitan Spaventa ("fear")

2. Rinoceronte ("rhino")

3. Fracassa ("uproar")

4. Spezzafer ("iron splitter")

5. Cocodrillo ("crocodile") – "a crocodile who never bites, he is all fanfare easily deflated," according to Rudlin.

6. Matamoros (Spanish for "Killer of Moors") – the original Spanish mercenary – was created by Francesco Andreini. He is powerfully built and very lavishly dressed. The clothes of his servants were supposedly made from the turbans of his victims. Has a hedgehog on his coat of arms, the result of his exploits at the battle of Trebizonde, where he claims to have fought his way into the tent of the Sultan himself. He then dragged him through the camp with one hand while fighting off the entire enemy army with the other hand. Afterward, so many arrows were stuck in him when he fought free that he resembled a hedgehog.

7. Scaramouche – Scaramuccia (Italian), or Scaramouche (French) ("skirmish") was a reinvention of the character by Tiberio Fiorilli. He is more of a man of action than he is a braggart and is clever, brave, and quick-witted rather than ignorant, cowardly, and foolish. He is also a good singer and musician and is usually depicted with a lute or guitar. Although quite a heartbreaker, he is usually indirectly or unobtrusively helpful to the innamorati.

- In the Punch and Judy shows, Scaramouche is depicted as a puppet with a detachable head or an extendable neck. The former is for il Capitano's incarnation, who seeks to fight all the other characters and the latter is for a singing puppet.
- Cyrano de Bergerac, a play by Edmond Rostand, is the most popular variant on Scaramouche. It portrays the historical figure as a violent, easily angered braggart who is sensitive about slurs on his considerable courage, his rural Gascon heritage, or his ugly face (which is identical to the features of the Scaramouche mask). He nobly helps his friend, a handsome but naïve and foolish youth, woo Roxane whom they both love.
- An unnamed soldier in a short play by Miguel de Cervantes called The Vigilant Sentinel matched this character to the letter. In the play he waits, bespectacled and wearing ragged clothes, desperately trying to frighten away any rival suitors from the house of the girl he wishes to marry.
- Baron Munchausen is another take on Scaramouche. He is usually depicted as an elderly man in an anachronistic 18th-century uniform, powdered wig with queue, a beak-like and prominent nose, curling mustaches and a goatee beard, and glasses. He uses his wits, his amazing luck and superhuman skills, and his gift of blather and blarney to defeat his enemies. He is also unusual in that he is handicapped by infirmities but is superhuman when he compensates for them. Without his glasses, he is blind as a bat; with them, he can see clearer and farther than a man with perfect vision. He has a lame leg, but when he carries his cane, he is capable of running faster and jumping higher and farther than an athlete.

8. Fanfarone – pretends to be Spanish, but is just a Zanni.

== See also ==
- Commedia dell'arte
