= Il Dottore =

Stock character of commedia dell'arte

Il Dottore (Italian: [il dotˈtoːre]; lit. 'the Doctor'), most commonly known in Italian as Dottor Balan or simply Balanzone (Italian: [balanˈtsoːne]; Bolognese Emilian: Dutåur Balanzån), is a commedia dell'arte stock character, in one scenario being an obstacle to young lovers. Il Dottore and Pantalone are the comic foils of each other, Pantalone being the decadent wealthy merchant, and il Dottore being the decadent erudite. He has been part of the main canon of characters since the mid-16th century.

== Overview ==
Il Dottore was born in the city of Bologna, Italy. He is comically inept. He is usually extremely rich, although the needs of the scenario might have things otherwise, and extremely pompous, loving the sound of his own voice and spouting ersatz Latin and Greek, il Dottore is known to be overly self loving and greedy. His interaction in the play is usually mostly with Pantalone, either as a friend, mentor or competitor.

== History ==
Il Dottore first originated as the comic foil of Pantalone. The character has his performance origins in the year 1560 with the actor Lucio Burchiella; two other mentions follow soon after, with a pair of vecchi being mentioned in the year 1565, and another mention of Dottore Gracian in 1574. Since his introduction, he has existed in some form or other due to his popularity and interactions with Pantalone; however, his popularity did wane in Italy by the 1800s. He has gone by many names besides il Dottore, those being Dottore Gratiano, Dottore Baloardo ("Dr. Dolt"), Dottore Spaccastrummolo ("Dr. Hack-and-Bandage"), Dottore Scarpazon, and Dottore Forbizone ("Dr. Large Scissor"). His many names reflect his buffoonish nature, and call attention to his positive traits. Il Dottore migrates to France with the Gelosi troupe during the year 1572, still performed by Lucio Burchiella. Since commedia dell'arte performers were itinerant by nature, it is only natural that his character was transplanted to other countries. By the late 17th century, il Dottore was firmly embedded in the public eye, as evidenced by the playwright Molière's inclusion of a Docteur-style character in his play La Jalousie du Barbouillé. In contemporary media, il Dottore can be found in many common characters, such as Sheldon from The Big Bang Theory and Dr. Zoidberg from Futurama.

== Characteristics ==
Rotund, il Dottore is fond of drink and food, but he loves chocolate the most. Il Dottore is also fond of girls. However, he is unfaithful and gets caught cheating several times; he is a love rat. Il Dottore is representative of the learned intellectual class, and as such is meant to playfully parody the educated elite. He attended the University of Bologna, and pretends to be an expert in many subjects, talking constantly, but usually having no idea about that of which he speaks. Depending on the portrayal, however, he can actually be very educated, and bore the other players into leaving the stage. The preferred crowd favorite, however, is Il Dottore who speaks nonsense. Il Dottore walks with his chest up, knees bent, and with a bouncy movement, taking small steps; he gesticulates with his hands and fingers, making room around him by keeping others at bay. He stands in one position and plants himself to make a point. Il Dottore can be the father to one of the innamorati, usually either Columbine or Isabella. There are, however, existing scenarios in which il Dottore is not a father, specifically "the Tooth-Puller", or il Cavadente. There is also precedence for Il Dottore to be cuckolded.

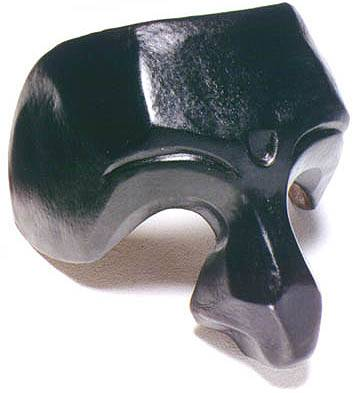
Traditional one-third mask of il Dottore

== Mask and costume ==
Unlike the majority of half masks in commedia dell'arte, il Dottore's mask is unique in that it is a one-third mask; the mask itself is meant to be a parody of a Bolognese jurisconsult. The actor's cheeks may sometimes have rouge applied to imply that il Dottore is fond of drinking. His costume is usually all or mostly black and he frequently wears a black felt hat with long, trailing robes. Under his black robes are shorter black robes and black shoes. The ruff around il Dottore's neck didn't come into play until his popularity in France grew, at which point it was adopted in 1653 by Agostino Lolli.

== See also ==
- Commedia dell'arte

== Bibliography ==
- Rudlin, John; Oliver Crick (2001). Commedia dell'arte. Routledge. ISBN 978-0-415-20409-5.
- The Italian Comedy by Pierre Louis Duchartre.
