= Commedia dell'arte =

Form of theatre originating in Italy

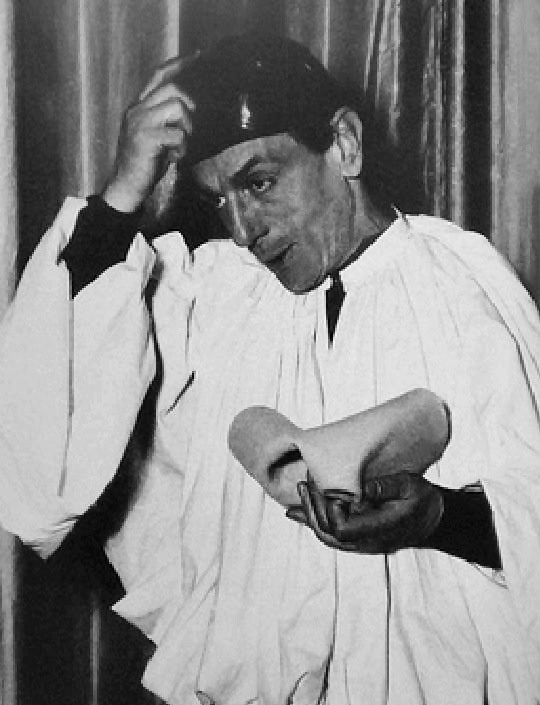
Eduardo De Filippo as Pulcinella, a character from the commedia dell'arte

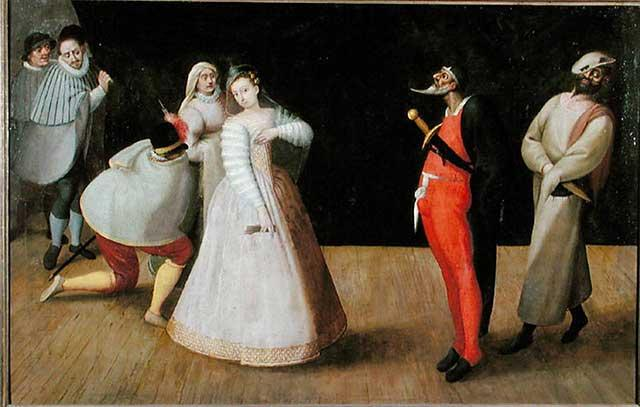
Commedia dell'arte troupe I Gelosi performing, by Hieronymus Francken I, c. 1590

Commedia dell'arte (Note: /kɒˈmeɪdiə dɛlˈɑːrteɪ, kəˈ-, -ˈmɛdiə -, -ˈɑːrti/ kom-AY-dee-ə del-AR-tay, kəm-, -ED-ee-ə -, -AR-tee, Italian: [komˈmɛːdja delˈlarte]; lit. 'comedy of the profession'.) was an early form of professional theatre, originating from Italian theatre, that was also popular in other regions of Europe such as France, between the 16th and 18th centuries. It was formerly called Italian comedy in English and is also known as commedia alla maschera, commedia improvviso, and commedia dell'arte all'improvviso. Commedia is characterized by masked "types" which are standardised archetypical characters shared across all productions and identified via their names, costumes, and functions in the comedy.

Commedia was responsible for the rise of actresses such as Isabella Andreini and improvised performances based on sketches or scenarios. A commedia, such as The Tooth Puller, contains both scripted and improvised portions; key plot points and characters' entrances and exits are scripted, but the actors may otherwise be expected to improvise new gags on stage. A special characteristic of commedia is the lazzo, a joke or "something foolish or witty", usually well known to the performers and to some extent a scripted routine. Another characteristic of commedia is pantomime, which is mostly used by the character Arlecchino, now better known as Harlequin.

The characters of the commedia usually represent fixed social types and stock characters, such as foolish old men, devious servants, or military officers full of false bravado. The characters are exaggerated "real characters", such as a know-it-all doctor called il Dottore, a clever and mischievous servant known as Arlecchino, a greedy old man called Pantalone, or a perfect relationship like the innamorati. Many troupes were formed to perform commedia, including I Gelosi (which had actors such as Isabella Andreini and her husband Francesco Andreini), Confidenti Troupe, Desioi Troupe, and Fedeli Troupe. Commedia was often performed outside on platforms or in popular areas such as a piazza (town square). The form of theatre originated in Italy, but travelled throughout Europe—sometimes to as far away as Moscow.

The genesis of commedia may be related to Carnival in Venice, where the author and actor Andrea Calmo had created the character Il Magnifico, the precursor to the vecchio (meaning 'old one' or simply 'old') Pantalone, by 1570. In the Flaminio Scala scenario, for example, Il Magnifico persists and is interchangeable with Pantalone into the 17th century. While Calmo's characters (which also included a Capitano type and a "il Dottore" type) were not masked, it is uncertain at what point the characters donned the mask. However, the connection to Carnival (the period between Epiphany and Ash Wednesday) would suggest that masking was a convention of Carnival and was applied at some point. The tradition in northern Italy is centred in Florence, Mantua, and Venice, where the major companies came under the protection of the various nobles. Concomitantly, a Neapolitan tradition emerged in the south and featured the prominent stage figure Pulcinella, which has been long associated with Naples and derived into various types elsewhere—most famously as the puppet character Punch (of the eponymous Punch and Judy shows) in England.

== History ==
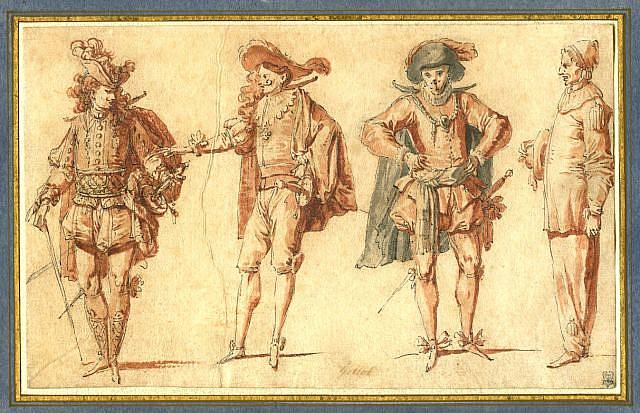
Claude Gillot (1673–1722), Four Commedia dell'Arte Figures: Three Gentlemen and Pierrot, c. 1715

Although commedia dell'arte flourished in the Italian theatre during the Mannerist period, there has been a long-standing tradition of trying to establish historical antecedents in antiquity. While it is possible to detect formal similarities between the commedia dell'arte and earlier theatrical traditions, there is no way to establish certainty of origin. Some date the origins to the period of the Roman middle republic (Plautine types) or the early republic (Atellan Farces). The Atellan Farces of the early Roman republic featured crude "types" wearing masks with grossly exaggerated features and an improvised plot. Some historians argue that Atellan stock characters, Pappus, Maccus (combined with Buccus), and Manducus, are the primitive versions of the commedia characters Pantalone, Pulcinella, and il Capitano. More recent accounts establish links to the medieval jongleurs, and prototypes from medieval moralities, such as Hellequin (as the source of Harlequin, for example).

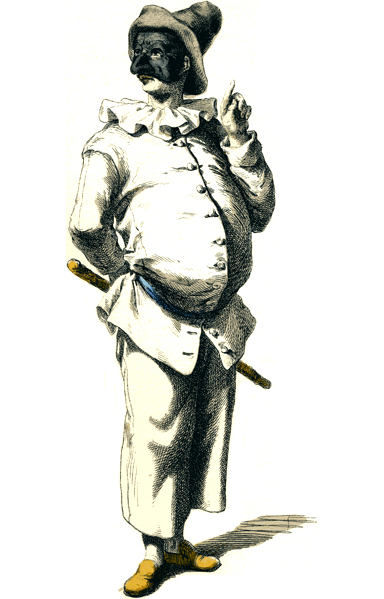
Pulcinella, drawn by Maurice Sand

The first recorded commedia dell'arte performances came from Rome as early as 1551. Commedia dell'arte was performed outdoors in temporary venues by professional actors who were costumed and masked, as opposed to commedia erudita (lit. 'learned comedy'), which were written comedies, presented indoors by untrained and unmasked actors. This view may be somewhat romanticized since records describe the Gelosi performing Tasso's Aminta, for example, and much was done at court rather than in the street. By the mid-16th century, specific troupes of commedia performers began to coalesce, and by 1568 the Gelosi became a distinct company. In keeping with the tradition of the Italian Academies, the Gelosi adopted as their impress (or coat of arms) the two-faced Roman god Janus. Janus symbolized both the comings and goings of this travelling troupe and the dual nature of the actor who impersonates the "other". The Gelosi performed in northern Italy and France, where they received protection and patronage from the King of France. Despite fluctuations, the Gelosi maintained stability for performances with the "usual ten": "two vecchi, four innamorati (two male and two female lovers), two Zanni, a captain and a servetta (serving maid)". Commedia often performed inside in court theatres or halls, and also as some fixed theatres such as Teatro Baldrucca in Florence. Flaminio Scala, who had been a minor performer in the Gelosi, published the scenarios of the commedia dell'arte around the start of the 17th century, really in an effort to legitimize the form—and ensure its legacy. These scenarios are highly structured and built around the symmetry of the various types in duet: two Zanni, vecchi, innamorate and innamorati, etc.

In commedia dell'arte, female roles were played by women, documented as early as the 1560s, making them the first known professional actresses in Europe since antiquity. Lucrezia Di Siena, whose name is on a contract of actors from 10 October 1564, has been referred to as the first Italian actress known by name, with Vincenza Armani and Barbara Flaminia as the first primadonnas and the first well-documented actresses in Italy (and Europe). In the 1570s, English theatre critics generally denigrated the troupes with their female actors (some decades later, Ben Jonson referred to one female performer of the commedia as a "tumbling whore"). By the end of the 1570s, Italian prelates attempted to ban female performers; however, by the end of the 16th century, actresses were standard on the Italian stage. The Italian scholar Ferdinando Taviani has collated a number of church documents opposing the advent of the actress as a type of courtesan, whose scanty attire and promiscuous lifestyle corrupted young men, or at least infused them with carnal desires. Taviani's term negativa poetica describes this and other practices offensive to the church, while giving us an idea of the phenomenon of the commedia dell'arte performance.

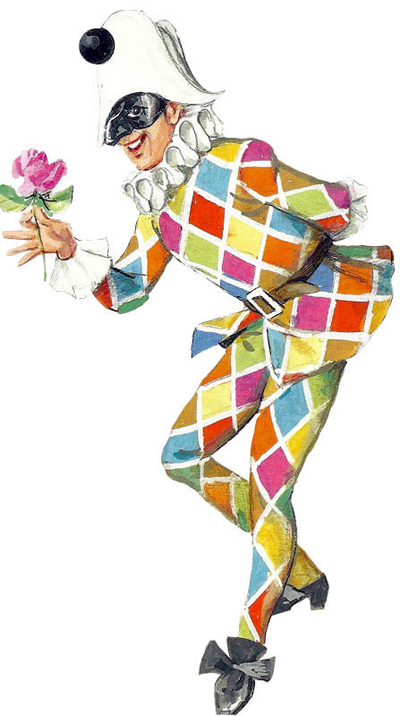
Harlequin in a 19th-century Italian print

By the early 17th century, the Zanni comedies were moving from pure improvisational street performances to specified and clearly delineated acts and characters. Three books written during the 17th century—Cecchini's Fruti della moderne commedia (1628), Niccolò Barbieri's La supplica (1634) and Perrucci's Dell'arte rapresentativa (1699)—"made firm recommendations concerning performing practice". Katritzky argues that, as a result, commedia was reduced to formulaic and stylized acting; as far as possible from the purity of the improvisational genesis a century earlier. In France, during the reign of Louis XIV, the Comédie-Italienne created a repertoire and delineated new masks and characters, while deleting some of the Italian precursors, such as Pantalone. French playwrights, particularly Molière, gleaned from the plots and masks in creating an indigenous treatment. Indeed, Molière shared the stage with the Comédie-Italienne at Petit-Bourbon, and some of his forms, e.g. the tirade, are derivative from the commedia (tirata).

Commedia dell'arte moved outside the city limits to the théâtre de la foire, or fair theatres, in the early 17th century as it evolved toward a more pantomimed style. With the dispatch of the Italian comedians from France in 1697, the form transmogrified in the 18th century as genres such as comédie larmoyante gained in attraction in France, particularly through the plays of Marivaux. Marivaux softened the commedia considerably by bringing in true emotion to the stage. Harlequin achieved more prominence during this period.

It is possible that this type of improvised acting was passed down the Italian generations until the 17th century, when it was revived as a professional theatrical technique. However, as currently used, the term commedia dell'arte was coined in the mid-18th century.

Commedia dell'arte was equally if not more popular in France, where it continued its popularity throughout the 17th century (until 1697), and it was in France that commedia developed its established repertoire. Commedia evolved into various configurations across Europe, and each country acculturated the form to its liking. For example, pantomime, which flourished in the 18th century, owes its genesis to the character types of the commedia, particularly Harlequin. The Punch and Judy puppet shows, popular to this day in England, owe their basis to the Pulcinella mask that emerged in Neapolitan versions of the form. In Italy, commedia masks and plots found their way into the opera buffa, and the plots of Rossini, Verdi, and Puccini.

During the Napoleonic occupation of Italy, instigators of reform and critics of French Imperial rule used the Carnival masks to hide their identities while fueling political agendas, challenging social rule and hurling blatant insults and criticisms at the regime. In 1797, in order to destroy the impromptu style of Carnival as a partisan platform, Napoleon outlawed the commedia dell'arte. It was not reborn in Venice until 1979 because of this.

== The History of Improv in Renaissance Italy ==
Improvisation originated in many different cultures as a way of performing when they didn’t have a means of understanding text, whether that was to honor their gods in performance or to put on shows for festivals such as Greek Dithyrambs. When it comes to Commedia dell'arte, it follows the same history in some aspects. Illiteracy was not an uncommon thing due to the hold that the Church had on the state at that time. The Church was in control of a lot of the information that was released to the public, especially books that spoke about other religions or anything that went against the teachings of the Catholic Church. The Church had control of where books would end up and who was able to read based on the level of their morals.

Much of what was performed in Renaissance Italy was written into a script, but with how often the Church demanded certain things be changed, the performers would improvise in order to perform other vulgar or otherwise unsatisfactory jokes that the Church had not put a ban on yet. It reached a point for these performers where scripts were not something that had to be presented word for word; they were outlines of points that had to be hit in order to tell a story, and the archetypes are what guided the actors for the range of improvisation that was permitted to their characters, but they would throw in what their comedic impulses would allow them to. A good amount of the jokes they presented were in rejection of the Church.

This art form generated mass amounts of influence across many regions and changed the way theater was performed in many areas. It created the foundation for slapstick comedy and character archetypes that are seen in every type of acting performances to this day.

== Companies ==
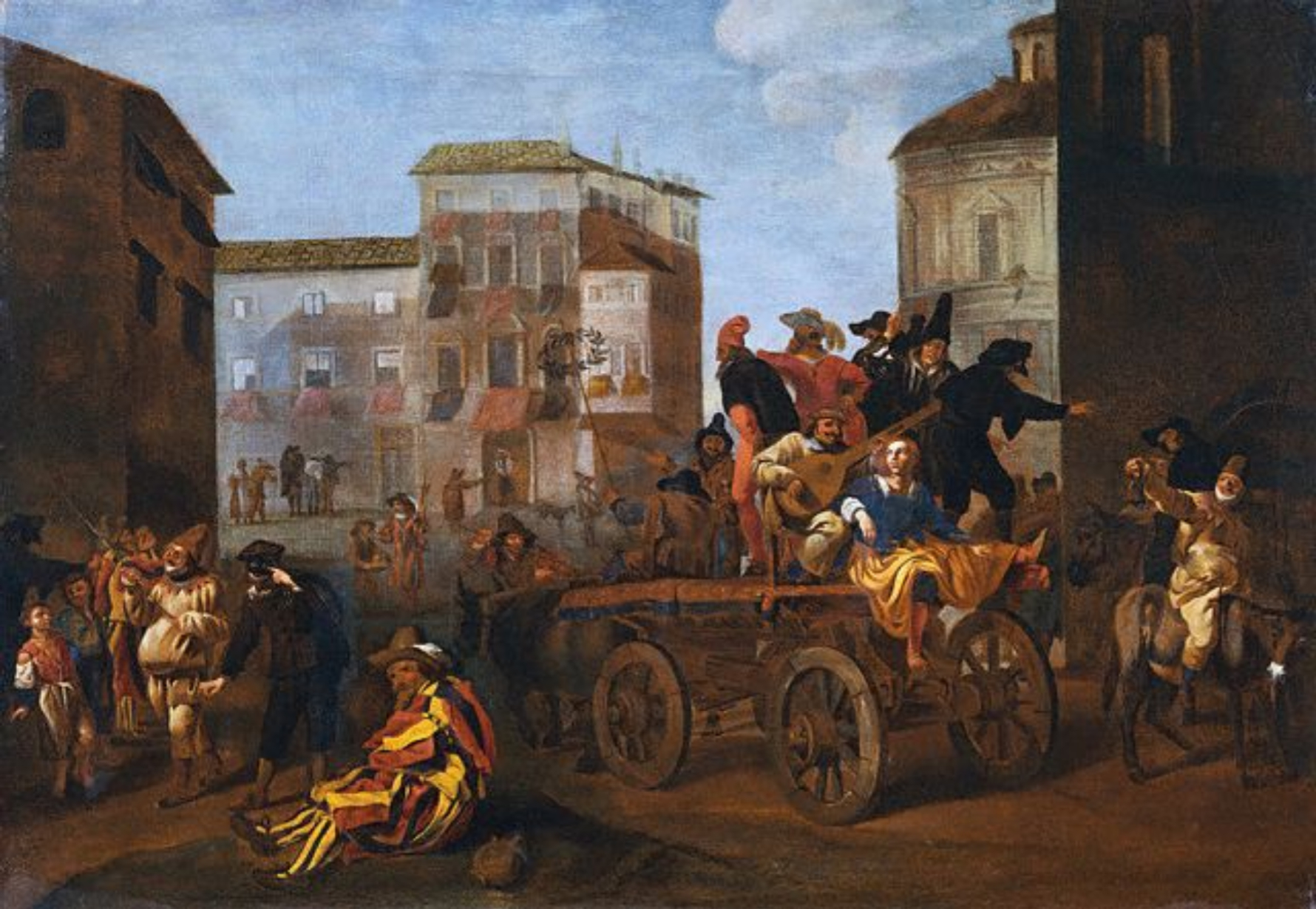
Commedia dell'Arte Troupe on a Wagon in a Town Square by Jan Miel (1640)

Compagnie, or companies, were troupes of actors, each of whom had a specific function or role. Actors were versed in a plethora of skills, with many having joined troupes without a theatre background. Some were doctors, others priests, others soldiers, enticed by the excitement and prevalence of theatre in Italian society. Actors were known to switch from troupe to troupe "on loan", and companies would often collaborate if unified by a single patron or performing in the same general location. Members would also splinter off to form their own troupes, such was the case with the Ganassa and the Gelosi. These compagnie travelled throughout Europe from the early period, beginning with the Soldati, then, the Ganassa, who travelled to Spain, and were famous for playing the guitar and singing—never to be heard from again—and the famous troupes of the Golden Age (1580–1605): Gelosi, Confidenti, Accessi. These names, which signified daring and enterprise, were appropriated from the names of the academies—in a sense, to lend legitimacy. Each troupe had its impresse (like a coat of arms), chosen to symbolize its nature. The Gelosi, for example, used the two-headed face of the Roman god Janus, to signify its comings and goings and relationship to the season of Carnival, which took place in January. Janus also signified the duality of the actor, who is playing a character or mask, while still remaining oneself.

Magistrates and clergy were not always receptive to the travelling compagnie, particularly during periods of plague, and because of their itinerant nature. Actors, both male and female, were known to strip nearly naked, and storylines typically descended into crude situations with overt sexuality, considered to teach nothing but "lewdness and adultery...of both sexes" by the French Parliament. The term vagabondi was used in reference to the comici, and remains a derogatory term to this day (vagabond). This was in reference to the nomadic nature of the troupes, often instigated by persecution from the Church, civil authorities, and rival theatre organisations that forced the companies to move from place to place.

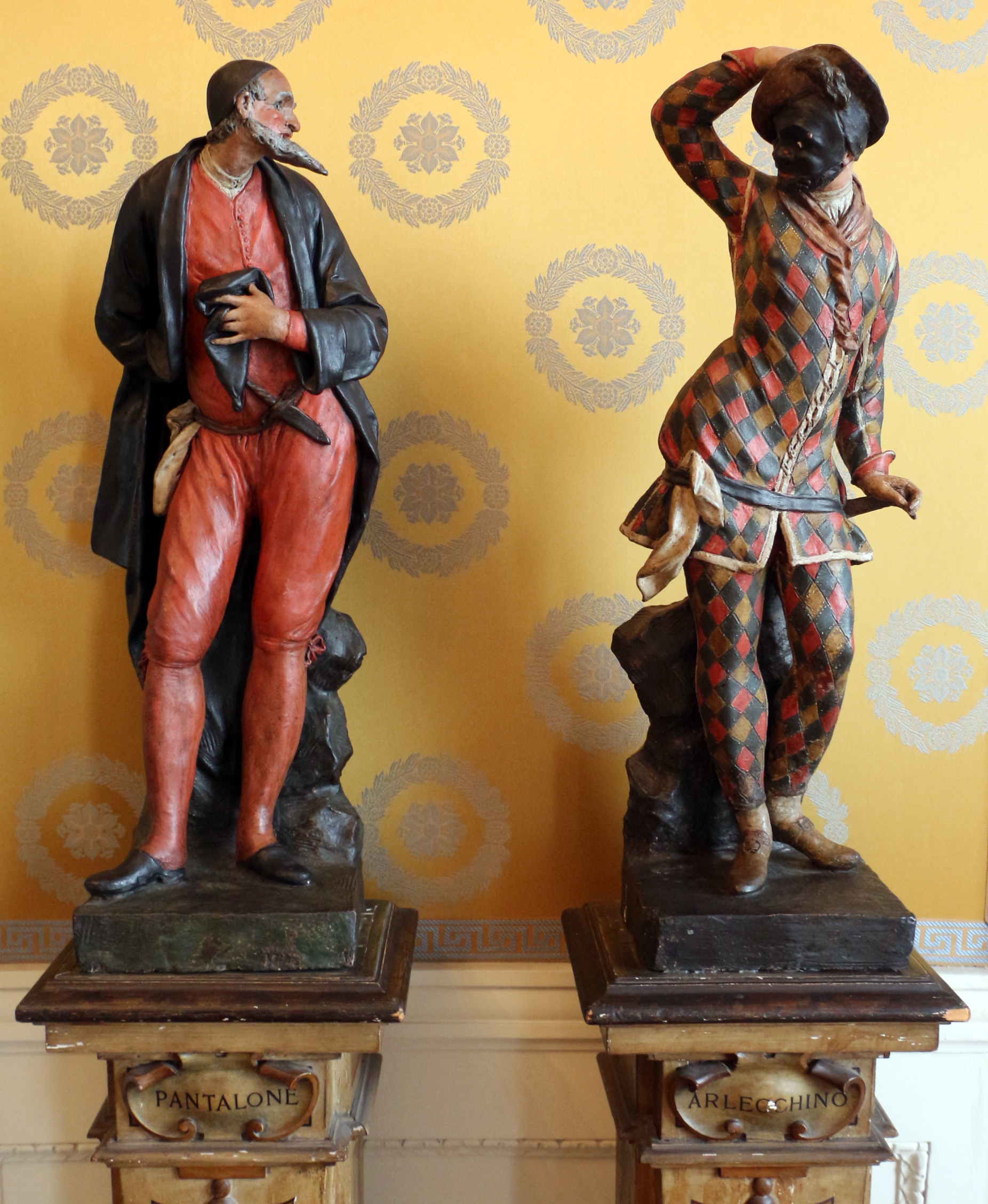
Statues of Pantalone and Harlequin, two stock characters from the commedia dell'arte, in the Museo Teatrale alla Scala, Milan

A troupe often consisted of ten performers of familiar masked and unmasked types, and included women. The companies would employ carpenters, props masters, servants, nurses, and prompters, all of whom would travel with the company. They would travel in large carts laden with supplies necessary for their nomadic style of performance, enabling them to move from place to place relatively easily. This nomadic nature, although influenced by persecution, was also largely due in part to the troupes requiring new (and paying) audiences. They would take advantage of public fairs and celebrations, most often in wealthier towns where financial success was more probable. Companies would also find themselves summoned by high-ranking officials, who would offer patronage in return for performing on their land for a certain length of time. Companies in fact preferred not to stay in any one place too long, mostly out of a fear of the act becoming "stale". They would move on to the next location while still in popular demand, ensuring towns were sad to see them leave, and thus likely to invite them back or enthusiastically welcome their return. Prices were set by the troupes themselves, and varied depending on the wealth of the location, the length of stay, and the regulations a local government had in place for dramatic performances.

=== List of known commedia troupes ===
- Compagnia dei Fedeli: active 1601–1652, with Giambattista Andreini
- Compagnia degli Accesi: active 1590–1628
- Compagnia degli Uniti: active 1578–1640
- Compagnia dei Confidenti: active 1574–1599; reformed under Flaminio Scala, operated again 1611–1639
- I Desiosi: active 1581–1599
- I Gelosi: active 1568–1604
- Signora Violante and Her Troupe of Dancers: active 1729–1732
- Zan Ganassa: active 1568–1610

== Characters ==
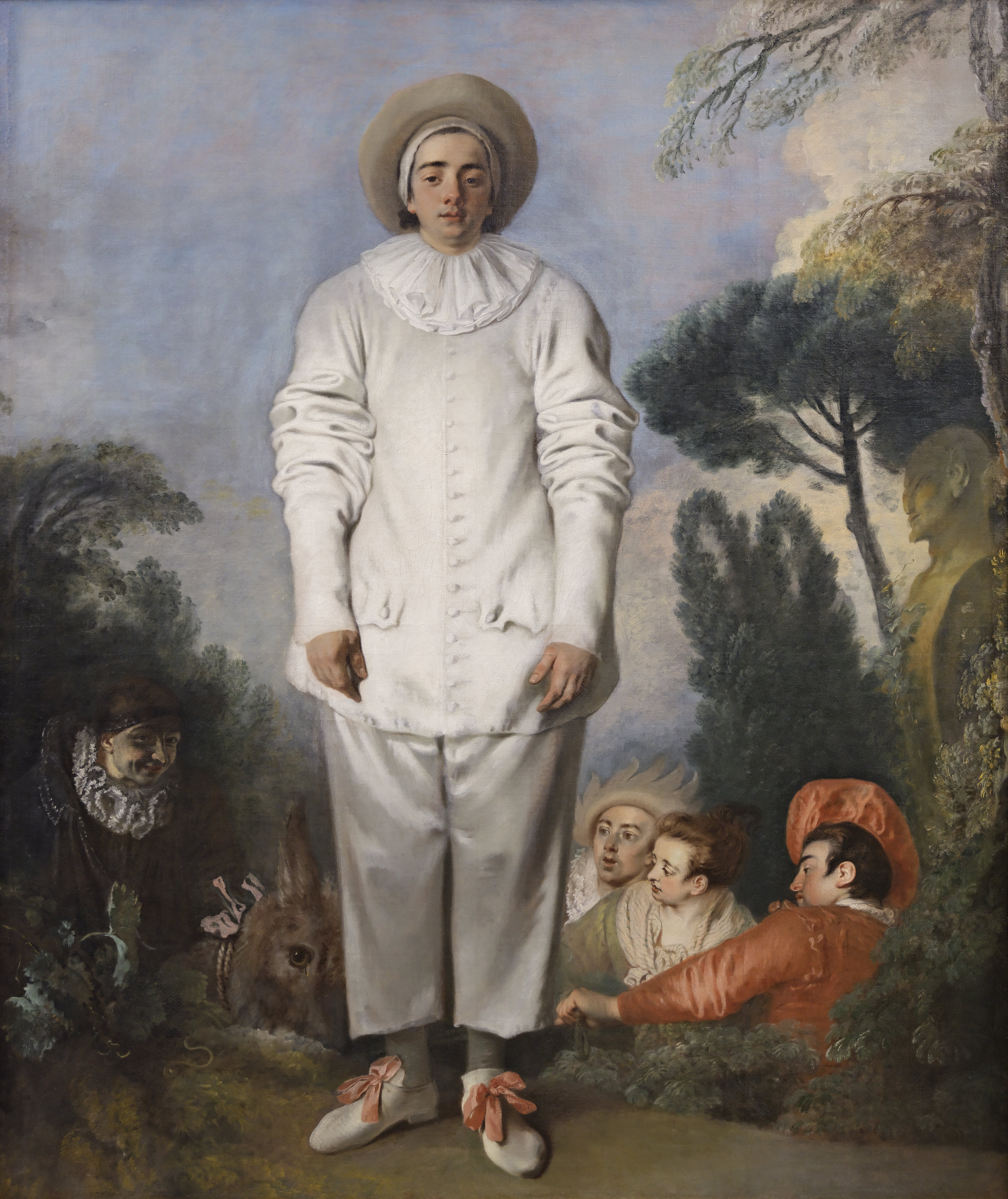
Jean-Antoine Watteau (1684–1721), commedia dell'arte player of Pierrot, c. 1718–19, identified as "Gilles". Louvre, Paris.

Generally, the actors playing were diverse in background in terms of class and religion, and performed anywhere they could. Castagno posits that the aesthetic of exaggeration, distortion, anti-humanism (as in the masked types), and excessive borrowing as opposed to originality was typical of all the arts in the late Italian Renaissance. Theatre historian Martin Green points to the extravagance of emotion during the period of commedia's emergence as the reason for representational moods, or characters, that define the art. In commedia, each character embodies a mood: mockery, sadness, gaiety, confusion, and so forth.

According to 18th-century London theatre critic Baretti, commedia dell'arte incorporates specific roles and characters that were "originally intended as a type of characteristic representative of some particular Italian district or town" (archetypes). The character's persona included the specific dialect of the region or town represented. Meaning that on stage, each character was performed in its own dialect. Characters would often be passed down from generation to generation, and onstage married couples were often married in real life as well, seen most famously with Francesco and Isabella Andreini. This custom was believed to make performances more natural, as well as strengthening the bonds within the troupe, which emphasized complete unity between all members. Additionally, each character has a singular costume and mask that is representative of the character's role.

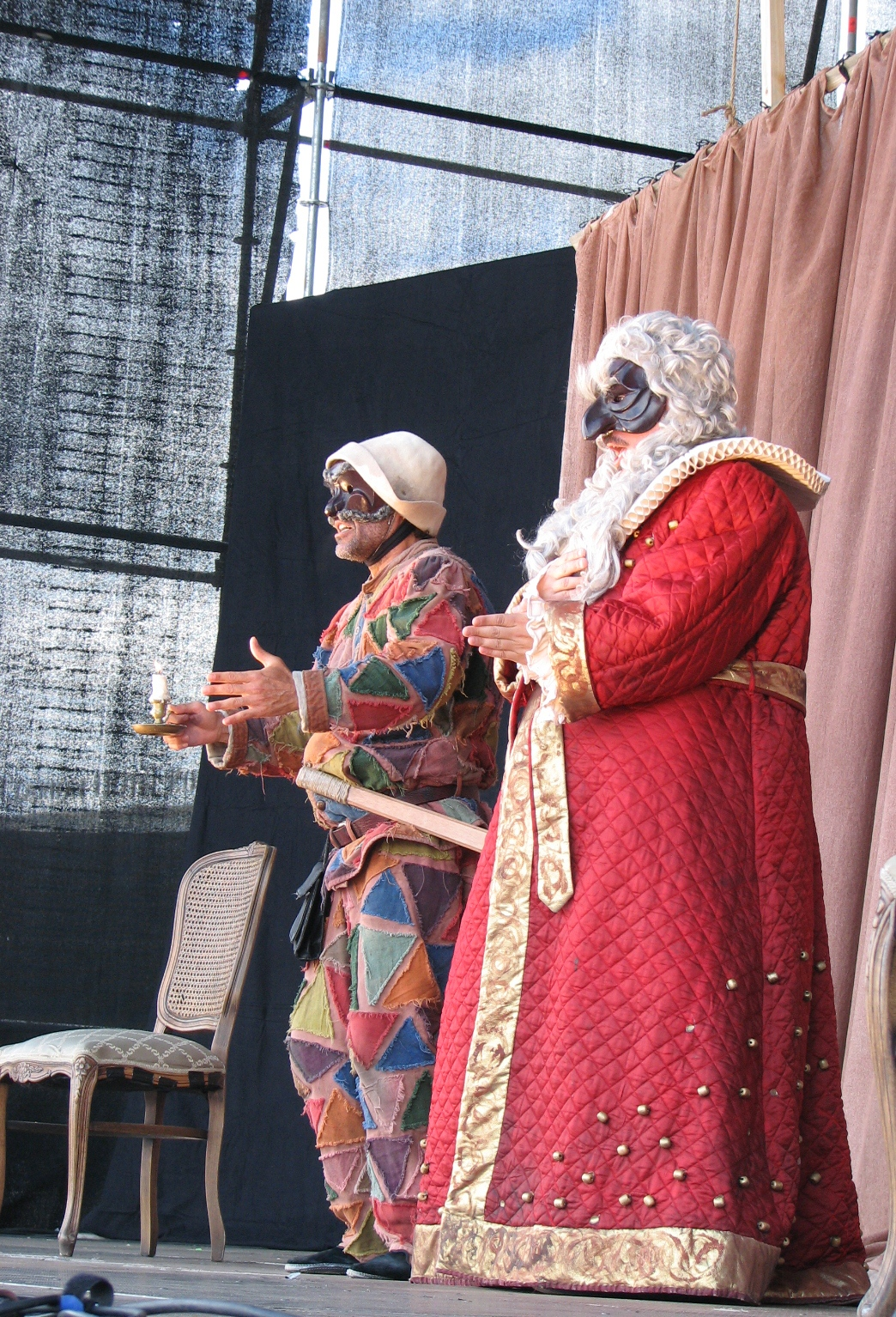
Harlequin and Pantalone in a 2011 play in Tallinn, Estonia

Commedia dell'arte has four stock character groups:

1. Zanni: servants, clowns; characters such as Arlecchino (also known as Harlequin), Brighella, Scapino, Pulcinella and Pedrolino
2. Vecchi: wealthy old men, masters; characters such as Pantalone and il Dottore
3. Innamorati: young upper class lovers; who would have names such as Flavio and Isabella
4. Il Capitano: self-styled captains, braggarts (Scaramuccia); can also be la Signora if a female

Masked characters are often referred to as "masks" (Italian: maschere), which, according to John Rudlin, cannot be separated from the character. In other words, the characteristics of the character and the characteristics of the mask are the same. In time however, the word maschere came to refer to all of the characters of the commedia dell'arte whether masked or not. Female characters (including female servants) are most often not masked (female amorose are never masked). The female character in the masters group is called Prima Donna and can be one of the lovers. There is also a female character known as The Courtisane who can also have a servant. Female servants wore bonnets. Their character was played with a malicious wit or gossipy gaiety. The amorosi are often children of a male character in the masters group, but not of any female character in the masters group, which may represent younger women who have e.g. married an old man, or a high-class courtesan. Female characters in the masters group, while younger than their male counterparts, are nevertheless older than the amorosi. Some of the better known commedia dell'arte characters are Pierrot and Pierrette, Pantalone, Gianduja, il Dottore, Brighella, il Capitano, Colombina, the innamorati, Pedrolino, Pulcinella, Arlecchino, Sandrone, Scaramuccia (also known as Scaramouche), la Signora, and Tartaglia.

Short list of characters
Character(s)	Masks	Status	Costume
Beltrame	Yes	Villager who pretends to be rich	Tunic and cape
Brighella	Yes	Smart and vindictive servant/middle class character	White smock and pants with green trim
Colombina	No	Perky maid / servant	Can be colorful on par with Harlequin or black and white
Gianduja	No	Honest peasant who loves wine and food	Brown suit and horn hat
Harlequin	Yes	Servant (sometimes to two masters)	Colorful tight-fitting jacket and trousers
Il Capitano	Yes	Indigent loner	Military uniform
Il Dottore	Yes	Head of the household	Black scholarly robe
Innamorati	No	High-class hopeless lovers	Nicely dressed on par with the time
Pantalone	Yes	Older wealthy man	Dark capes and red trousers
Pierrot	No (but heavy makeup)	Servant (Sad clown)	White, flowy costume with large buttons
Pulcinella	Yes	Servant or master	Baggy, white outfit
Sandrone	No	Cunning peasant	Corduroy jacket and pants, red and white cross-striped socks
Scaramouche	Yes, later removed	Braggart with villainous traits	Black Spanish dress
Tartaglia	Yes	Stuttering statesman	Large felt hat and enormous cloak

In the 17th century, as commedia became popular in France, the characters of Pierrot, Columbine and Harlequin were refined and became essentially Parisian, according to Green.

== Costumes ==
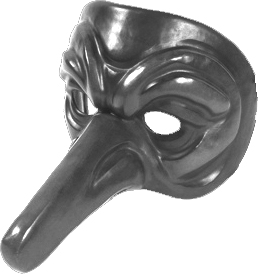
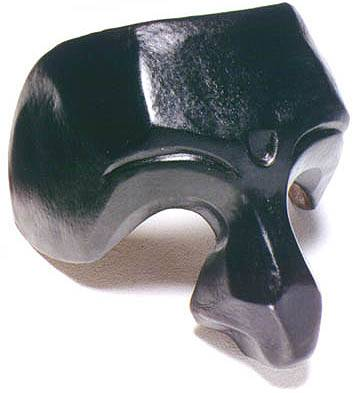
Masks of il Capitano (left) and il Dottore (right)

Each character in commedia dell'arte has a distinct costume that helps the audience understand who the character is.

Harlequin originally wore a long, tight-fitting jacket with matching trousers that both had numerous odd-shaped patches, usually green, yellow, red, and brown. Usually, a bat and a wallet would hang from his belt. His hat, which was a soft cap, was modeled after Charles IX or after Henri II, and almost always had a tail of a rabbit, hare, or fox with the occasional tuft of feathers. During the 17th century, the patches turned into blue, red, and green triangles arranged in a symmetrical pattern. In the 18th century, the iconic Harlequin look with diamond-shaped lozenges took shape. The jacket became shorter, and the hat changed from a soft cap to a double-pointed hat.

Il Dottore's costume was a play on the academic dress of the Bolognese scholars. Il Dottore is almost always clothed entirely in black. He wore a long, black gown or jacket that went below the knees. Over the gown, a long, black robe went down to his heels, and he wore black shoes, stockings, and breeches. In 1653, his costume was changed by Augustin Lolli, who was a very popular il Dottore actor. He added an enormous black hat, changed the robe to a jacket cut similarly to Louis XIV, and added a flat ruff to the neck.

Il Capitano's costume is similar to il Dottore's in that it is also a satire—in this case, on the military wear of the time. This costume would therefore change, depending on the time period and locale of the Capitano character.

Pantalone has one of the most iconic costumes of commedia dell'arte. Typically, he wears a tight-fitting jacket with matching trousers. He usually pairs these garments with a big, black coat called a zimarra.

Women, who usually played servants or lovers, wore less stylized costumes than the men in commedia. The innamorati would wear what was considered to be the fashion of the time period. They would normally not wear masks but would be heavily made up.

== Subjects ==
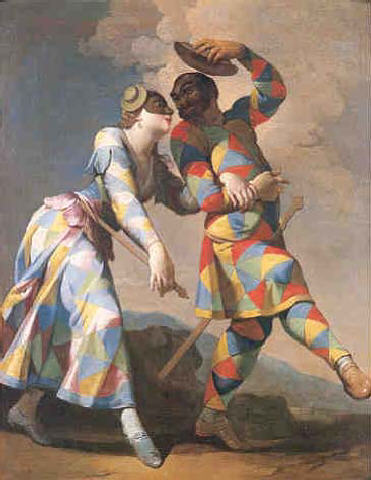
Harlequin and Colombina. Paint by Giovanni Domenico Ferretti.

Conventional plot lines were written on themes of sex, jealousy, love, and old age. Many of the basic plot elements can be traced back to the Roman comedies of Plautus and Terence, some of which were themselves translations of lost Greek comedies of the 4th century BC. However, it is more probable that the comici used contemporary novella or traditional sources, and drew from current events and local news of the day. Not all scenarios were comic, there were some mixed forms and even tragedies. Shakespeare's The Tempest is drawn from a popular scenario in the Scala collection, his Polonius (Hamlet) is drawn from Pantalone, and his clowns bear homage to the Zanni.

Comici performed written comedies at court. Song and dance were widely used, and a number of innamorati were skilled madrigalists, a song form that uses chromatics and close harmonies. Audiences came to see the performers, with plotlines becoming secondary to the performance. Among the great innamorate, Isabella Andreini was perhaps the most widely known, and a medallion dedicated to her reads "eternal fame". Tristano Martinelli achieved international fame as the first of the great Harlequins, and was honoured by the Medici and the Queen of France. Performers made use of well-rehearsed jokes and stock physical gags, known as lazzi and concetti, as well as on-the-spot improvised and interpolated episodes and routines, called burle (sing.: burla, Italian for 'joke'), usually involving a practical joke.

Since the productions were improvised, dialogue and action could easily be changed to satirize local scandals, current events, or regional tastes, while still using old jokes and punchlines. Characters were identified by costumes, masks, and props, such as a type of baton known as a slapstick. These characters included the forebears of the modern clown, namely Harlequin and the Zanni. Harlequin, in particular, was allowed to comment on current events in his entertainment.

The classic, traditional plot is that the innamorati are in love and wish to be married, but one elder (vecchio) or several elders (vecchi) are preventing this from happening, leading the lovers to ask one or more Zanni (eccentric servants) for help. Typically the story ends happily, with the marriage of the innamorati and forgiveness for any wrongdoings.

While generally personally unscripted, the performances often were based on scenarios that gave some semblance of a plot to the largely improvised format. The Flaminio Scala scenarios, published in the early 17th century, are the most widely known collection and representative of its most esteemed compagnia, I Gelosi.

== Influence in visual art ==
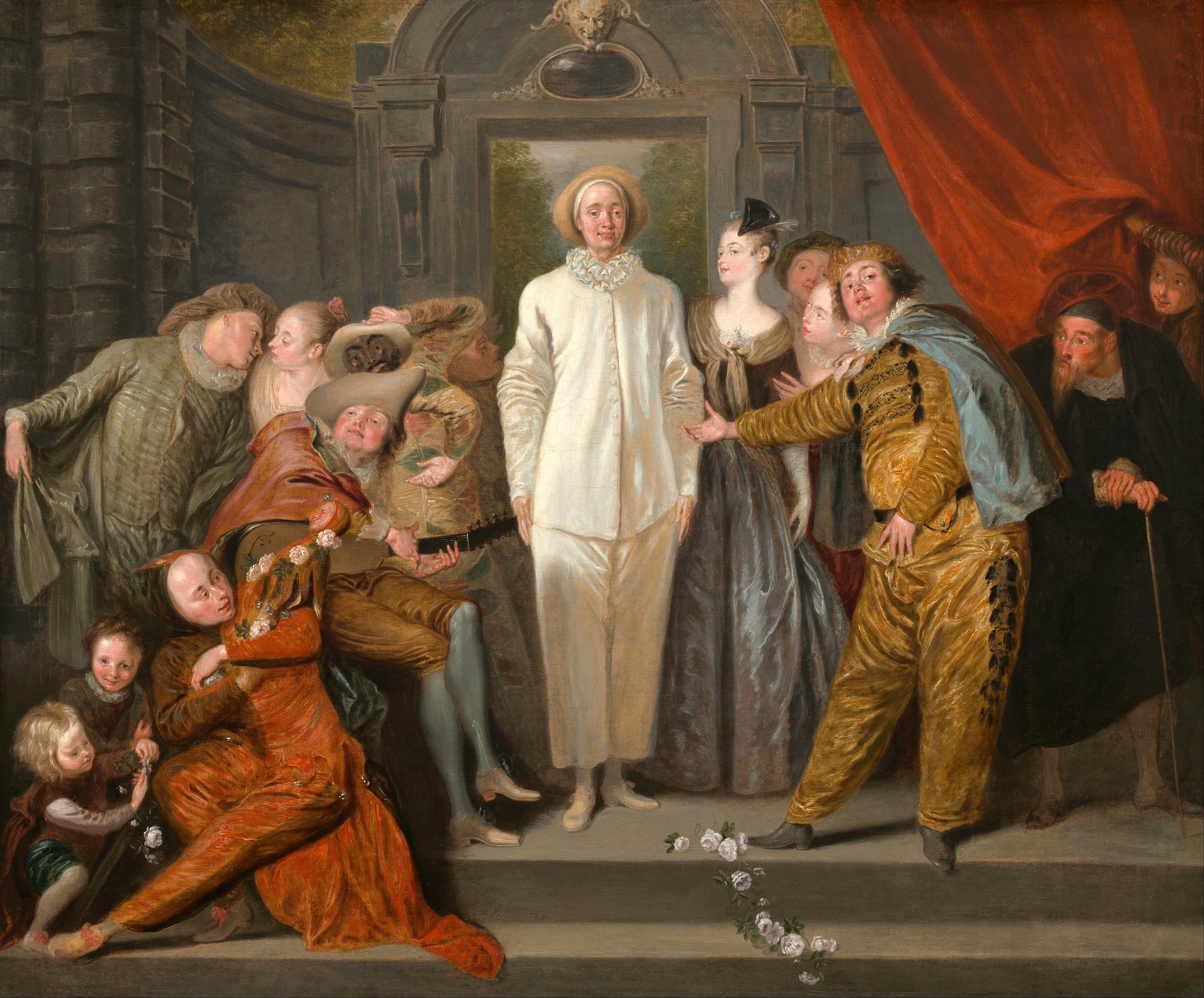
Jean-Antoine Watteau, Italian Comedians, 1720

The iconography of the commedia dell'arte represents an entire field of study that has been examined by commedia scholars such as Erenstein, Castagno, Katritzky, Molinari, and others. In the early period, representative works by painters at Fontainebleau were notable for their erotic depictions of the thinly veiled innamorata, or the bare-breasted courtesan/actress.

The Flemish influence is widely documented as commedia figures entered the world of the vanitas genre, depicting the dangers of lust, drinking, and the hedonistic lifestyle. Castagno describes the Flemish pittore vago ('wandering painter') who assimilated themselves within Italian workshops and even assumed Italian surnames: one of the most influential painters, Lodewyk Toeput, for example, became Ludovico Pozzoserrato and was a celebrated painter in the Veneto region of Italy. The pittore vago can be attributed with establishing commedia dell'arte as a genre of painting that would persist for centuries.

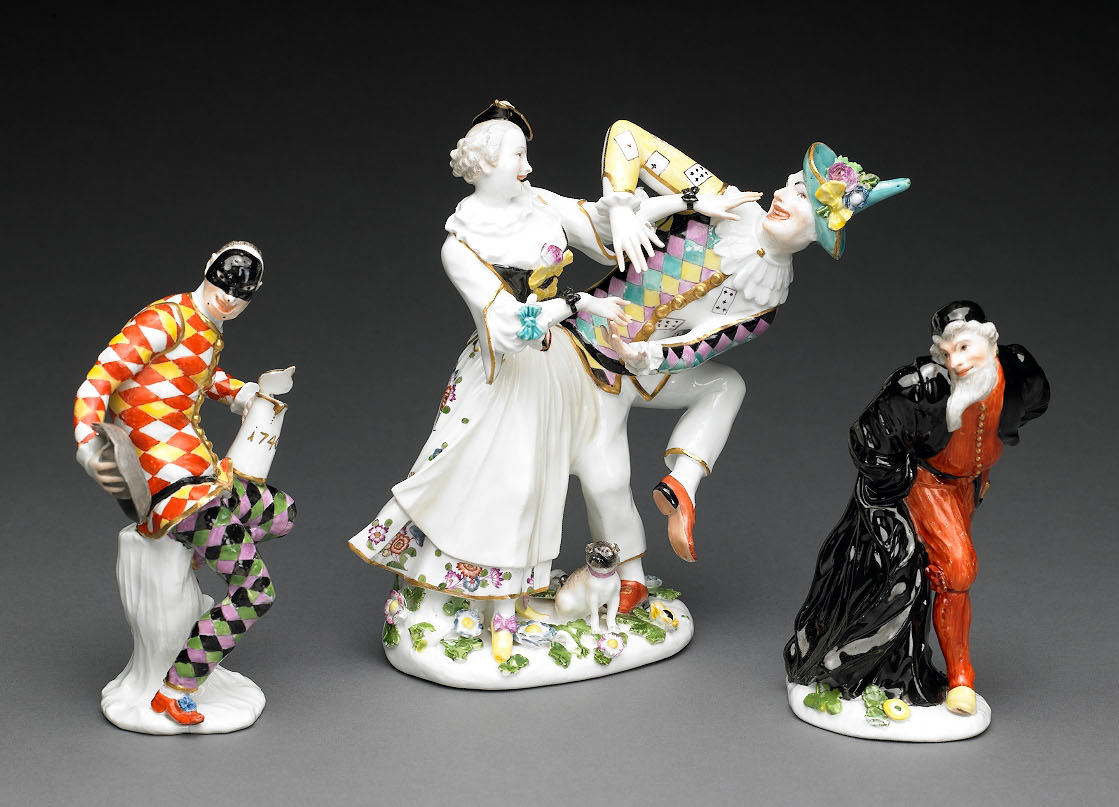
Johann Joachim Kändler's commedia dell'arte figures in Meissen porcelain, c. 1735–44

While the iconography gives evidence of the performance style (see Fossard collection), many of the images and engravings were not depictions from real life, but concocted in the studio. The Callot etchings of the Balli di Sfessania (1611) are most widely considered capricci rather than actual depictions of a commedia dance form, or typical masks. While these are often reproduced in large formats, the actual prints measured about 2×3 inches. In the 18th century, Watteau's painting of commedia figures intermingling with the aristocracy were often set in sumptuous garden or pastoral settings and were representative of that genre.

Pablo Picasso's 1921 painting Three Musicians is a colorful representation of commedia-inspired characters. Picasso also designed the original costumes for Stravinsky's Pulcinella (1920), a ballet depicting commedia characters and situations. Commedia iconography is evident in porcelain figurines many selling for thousands of dollars at auction.

== Influence in performance art ==
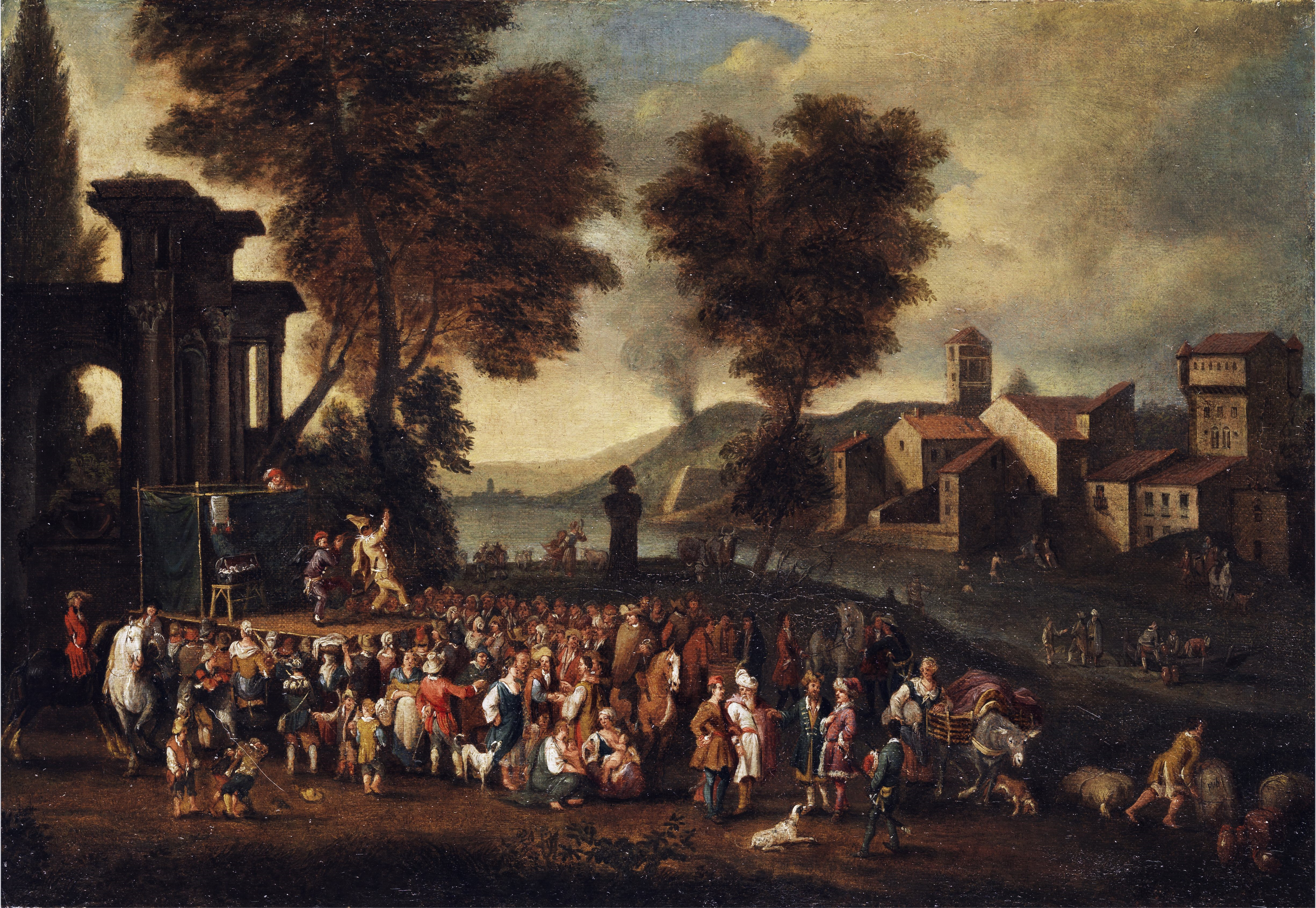
Peeter van Bredael, Commedia dell'Arte Scene in an Italian Landscape

The expressive theatre influenced Molière's comedy and subsequently ballet d'action, thus lending a fresh range of expression and choreographic means. An example of a commedia dell'arte character in literature is the Pied Piper of Hamelin who is dressed as Harlequin.

Music and dance were central to commedia dell'arte performance, and most performances had both instrumental and vocal music in them. Brighella was often depicted with a guitar, and many images of the commedia feature singing innamorati or dancing figures. In fact, it was considered part of the innamorati function to be able to sing and have the popular repertoire under their belt. Accounts of the early commedia, as far back as Calmo in the 1570s and the buffoni of Venice, note the ability of comici to sing madrigali precisely and beautifully. The danzatrice probably accompanied the troupes and may have been in addition to the general cast of characters.

The works of a number of playwrights have featured characters influenced by the commedia dell'arte and sometimes directly drawn from it. Prominent examples include The Tempest by William Shakespeare, Les Fourberies de Scapin by Molière, The Servant of Two Masters (1743) by Carlo Goldoni, the Figaro plays of Pierre Beaumarchais, and especially The Love for Three Oranges, Turandot and other fiabe by Carlo Gozzi. Influences appear in the lodgers in Steven Berkoff's adaptation of Franz Kafka's The Metamorphosis.

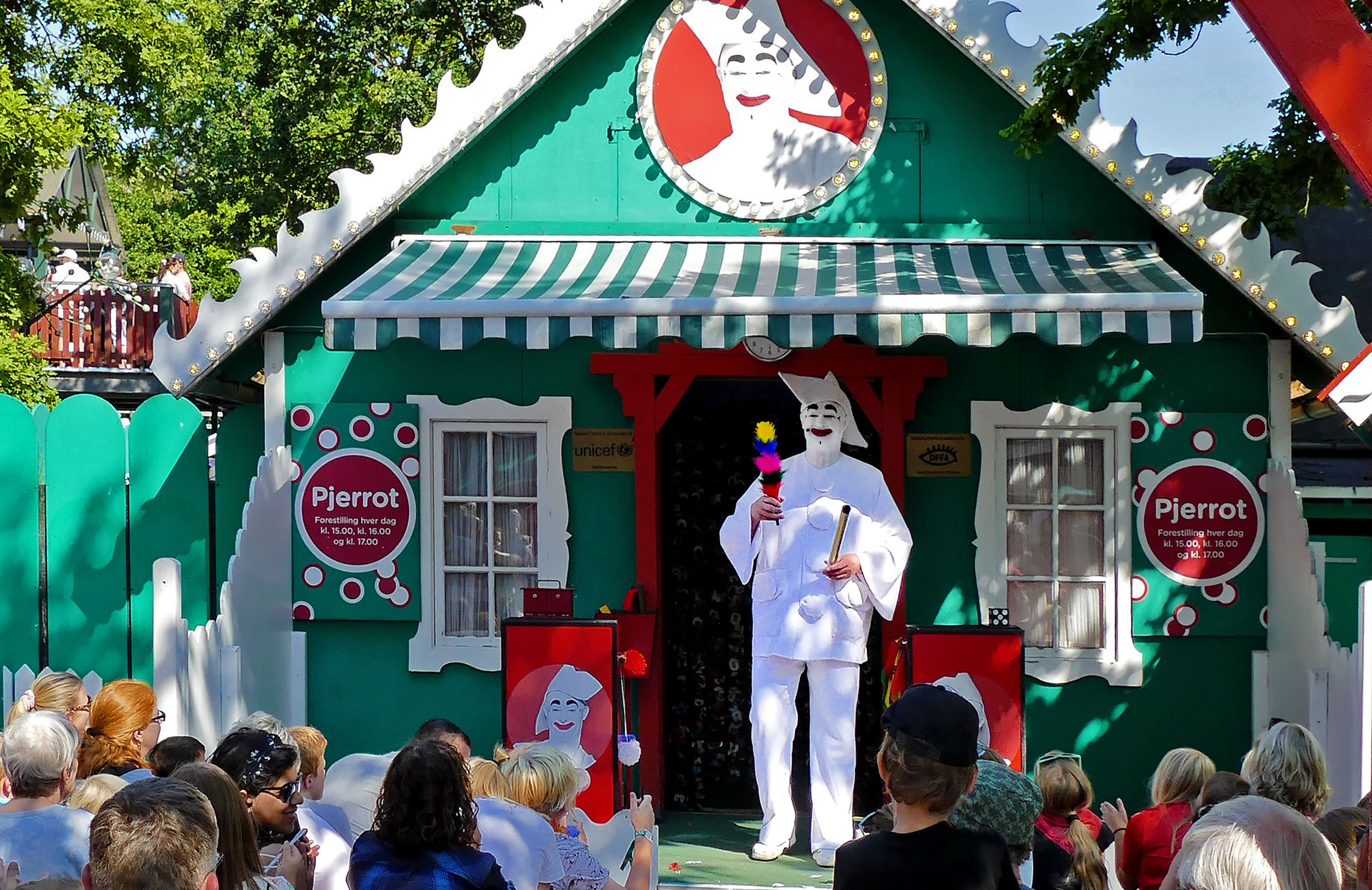
Pierrot as "Pjerrot" in Denmark

Through their association with spoken theatre and playwrights commedia figures have provided opera with many of its stock characters. Mozart's Don Giovanni sets a puppet show story and comic servants such as Leporello and Figaro have commedia precedents. Soubrette characters such as Susanna in Le nozze di Figaro, Zerlina in Don Giovanni and Despina in Così fan tutte recall Columbine and related characters. The comic operas of Gaetano Donizetti, such as L'elisir d'amore, draw readily upon commedia stock types. Leoncavallo's tragic melodrama Pagliacci depicts a commedia dell'arte company in which the performers find their life situations reflecting events they depict on stage. Commedia characters also figure in Richard Strauss's opera Ariadne auf Naxos.

The piano piece Carnaval by Robert Schumann was conceived as a type of masked ball that combined characters from commedia dell'arte with real world characters, such as Chopin, Paganini, and Clara Schumann, as well as characters from the composer's inner world. Movements of the piece reflect the names of many characters of the commedia, including Pierrot, Harlequin, Pantalone, and Columbine.

Stock characters and situations also appear in ballet. Igor Stravinsky's Petrushka and Pulcinella allude directly to the tradition.

Commedia dell'arte is performed seasonally in Denmark on the Peacock Stage of Tivoli Gardens in Copenhagen, and north of Copenhagen at Dyrehavsbakken. Tivoli has regular performances, while Bakken has daily performances for children by Pierrot and a puppet version of Pulcinella resembling Punch and Judy.

The characters created and portrayed by English comedian Sacha Baron Cohen (most famously Ali G, Borat, and Bruno) have been discussed in relation to their potential origins in commedia, as Baron Cohen was trained by French master clown Philippe Gaulier, whose other students have gone on to become teachers and performers of commedia.

== See also ==
- Commedia dell'arte staging and staging practices
- Costumes in commedia dell'arte
- Theatre of Italy

== Bibliography ==
- Castagno, Paul C. (1994). The Early Commedia dell'arte (1550–1621): The Mannerist Context. Bern, New York: Peter Lang Publishing.
- Cohen, Robert; Sherman, Donovan (2020). Theatre: Brief Edition (Twelfth ed.). New York, NY. ISBN 978-1-260-05738-6. OCLC 1073038874.
- Green, Martin; Swan, John (1993). The Triumph of Pierrot: The Commedia dell'arte and the Modern Imagination. Pennsylvania State University. ISBN 978-0-271-00928-5.
- Katritzky, M. A. (2006). The Art of Commedia: A Study in the Commedia dell'arte 1560–1620 with Special Reference to the Visual Records. New York: Editions Rodopi. ISBN 978-90-420-1798-6.
- Palleschi, Marino (2005). "The Commedia dell'arte: Its Origins, Development & Influence on the Ballet". Auguste Vestris.
- Rudlin, John. Commedia dell'arte: An Actor's Handbook. Ebook Corporation.
- Rudlin, John; Crick, Oliver (2001). Commedia dell'arte: A Handbook for Troupes. London: Routledge. ISBN 041-520-408-9.
- Smith, Winifred (1964). The Commedia dell'arte. Benjamin Bloom.
