= I Gelosi (play) =

I Gelosi is a play about the Italian commedia dell'arte troupe, I Gelosi. It was written by David Bridel, a past Dean of the USC School of Dramatic Arts. It was first performed in 2006 by the MFA Acting class of UCLA, of whom Bridel was a teacher. It was then staged professionally by The Los Angeles Theatre Ensemble in 2008. It has since been produced by Helsinki West in Los Angeles, STAGERight in Seattle, and at the University of Alabama and the University of North Texas.

== Summary ==
The play is very loosely based on the history of the troupe. The plot centers around Isabella Andreini's joining of the group in its early days, elevating them from poor street performers to massive success with her acting and poetry, and the revolutionary act of allowing a woman to perform onstage. Their attention earns them the patronage of the Duke of Mantua and their official adoption of the I Gelosi title. Throughout this, a romance buds between Isabella and Francesco. The play dramatizes the company's travels to France, where they perform a play satirizing the Pope that thrusts them into a scandal. They become involved in the Huguenot Rebellion on both sides, taken hostage by the Huguenots and labeled spies by the monarchy. They flee to Mantua only to be turned away for the controversy they have created. Isabella begins to go mad, and turmoil and conflict arise within the group. The play ends with Isabella dying, and the troupe being disbanded, their success lost and returning to poverty.

The play is a fictitious account of the troupe, with the plot elaborating and dramatizing facts of the company's travels.

== Historical Inaccuracies ==
- The play has Francesco Andreini forming I Gelosi, in reality it was Flaminio Scala who formed the troupe, with Andreini joining later. Scala is, in fact, omitted entirely from the play.
- The troupe is shown embroiled in the Huguenot Rebellion, in reality they left France before even the St. Bartholomew's Day Massacre, with the true Huguenot Rebellion not occurring until 1620, after the group's disbandment. Though the group was captured by Huguenots at one point, there is no indication of violent resistance.
- The troupe's disbandment is shown leaving the members in poverty and ruin; in reality the group was disbanded while still relatively successful, with the disbandment motivated more by the death of Isabella.
