= Vittoria Piisimi =

Italian opera singer

Vittoria Piisimi (fl. 1595), was an Italian actress, singer, dancer, theatre director and musician. Known as la divina Vittoria Piisimi, she was one of the most famous Italian actors of the period. She and the Italian actress Isabella Andreini were described as great rivals.

== Life ==
Piisimi was the prima donna of the famous commedia dell'arte Gelosi company of Flaminio Scala. The company, first mentioned in 1568, was the first commedia to tour outside Italy when it performed in Paris in 1571, and was described as the foremost commedia dell'arte troupe. Piisimi is first mentioned in 1573, and confirmed as a member of the Gelosi troupe in 1574. She would in fact have been active earlier, as it was known that her lover, actor Adriano Valerini from Verona, left her for Vincenza Armani, who died in 1569, four years before 1573.

Piisimi replaced Armani as the prima donna of the Italian theatre. Piisimi combined her acting with singing, dancing and by writing music and was reportedly admired also in these fields. She was called comica gelosa and mainly played the parts of heroine and subretto. On July 24, 1574, she performed for Henry III of France in the role of Pallas Athena in Venice, where she received great praise. During his visit to Venice in 1576, reportedly because of Piismi's previous performance, Henry III requested that the French ambassador provide money to the Gelosi so that they could travel to perform at the French court. In 1579-1581, she was the leader of her own theatre company. She then returned to the Gelosi.

In 1589, the Gelosi troupe performed in Florence at the wedding of Grand Duke Ferdinando I de' Medici and Christina of Lorraine. At this event, the "rival prime donne" Vittoria Piisimi performed as the gypsy in La Zingara and Isabella Andreini as the madwoman in La Pazzia d'Isabella. Their performances were considered the great highlight of the event and became a famous event of their rivalry.

In 1592, Piisimi left the Gelosi theatre. She was for a time the director of the Gli Uniti company. She returned to the Gelosi company in 1595.

The death date of Piisimi is unknown. She is last mentioned in 1595.
