= Diana Ponti =

Italian stage actress

Diana Ponti, also known as Lavinia Ponti (d. circa 1615), was an Italian stage actress.

Ponti was the daughter of the actor Adriano Valerini. She was the managing actor-director (or capocomico) of the company I Desiosi, which was also called Diana Comica Dediosa after her. The exact years are not known but she is confirmed as such in 1585–1588 and would have retired as such prior to 1597, when Flaminio Scala is noted as manager. The position as manager of a company was not common in the 16th-century and she would have been a pioneer in Europe in this aspect. She enjoyed fame and popularity and was a well-noted actor of her day in contemporary Italy; she even performed at the marriage of Henri IV and his new queen, Marie de Medici. She was also active as a poet.
