= I Gelosi =

Theatre company

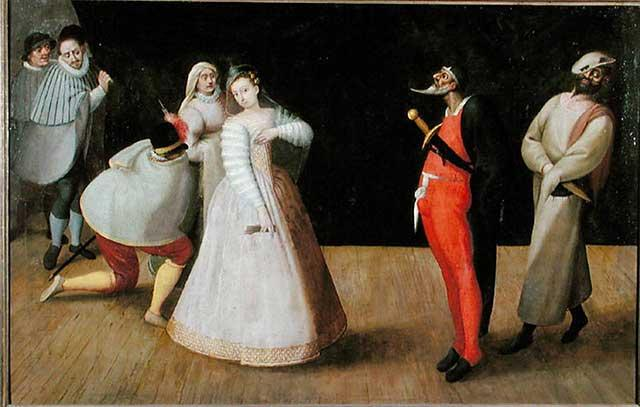
Commedia dell'arte troupe I Gelosi performing, by Hieronymus Francken I, c. 1590

I Gelosi (Italian: [i dʒeˈloːzi, -oːsi]; lit. 'the Zealous Ones') was an Italian acting troupe that performed commedia dell'arte from 1569 to 1604. Their name stems form their motto: Virtù, fama ed honor ne fèr gelosi, long thought to mean "Virtue, fame and honour made us jealous", or "We are jealous of attaining virtue, fame, and honour", signifying that such rewards could only be attained by those who sought for them jealously. Modern reevaluations have considered "zealous" (present-day Italian zelanti) as a more accurate translation over "jealous", redefining their motto to signify that, as actors, they were zealous to please.

I Gelosi was formed in Milan, Italy, by Flaminio Scala. Their first notable performer was Vittoria Piisimi. I Gelosi was the first troupe to be patronized by nobility: in 1574 and 1577 they performed for the king of France. Audiences in France were enthused by the raunchiness and comedy of their performances and were willing to pay a decent sum to watch them. After this they toured all over Europe, spreading commedia dell'arte from Italy to France, Poland, Spain, Germany, and England. Not only was I Gelosi the first troupe patronized by nobility, they were also some of the first to allow women to perform as women, and also write and direct, during this time period

In the 1570s, Francesco Andreini joined I Gelosi and in 1578 he married Isabella Canali, an actress with the troupe. The Andreinis became the troupe's most famous performers and eventually Francesco took over as its head.

In 1604, Isabella died in childbirth in France. Francesco was so overwrought that he disbanded the troupe and retired from the stage. The stock commedia dell'arte character Isabella is named in her honor.

== History ==
=== Formation and members ===
The Gelosi are first recorded as performing in Milan in 1568. Their organization functioned without a head of directors, similarly, commedia dell'arte, the form of theatre that the troupe performed operates without a script or predetermined directions. Many of the original members of the troupe were also associated with the troupe of Zan Ganassa. When Ganassa left for Spain, some of his actors remained in Italy and reformed under the Gelosi title, with Flaminio Scala as the first director of the new troupe. Francesco Andreini, is first heard of in the troupe in 1576, and succeeded Scala as director in 1578, though Scala remained with the troupe. Vittoria Piisimi was the group's first Prima Donna, while also directing for I Gelosi, and later, I Confidenti, and I Uniti. Vittoria was subsequently replaced with Isabella, already married to Francesco, in 1578 after leaving the troupe. Francesco and Isabella made their marriage public in this year, but it is believed they were previously married in a private ceremony in 1576, soon after the birth of their first child. Vittoria left the troupe to join I Confidenti, and there were rumors that the group's banishment from Mantua was of her doing; the Confidenti were the troupe patronized by the Duke of Mantua, and the actress may have influenced his decision. The troupe, as with most of the era, always contained between 10 and 12 members, with most remaining in the troupe during their "Golden Age" in the late 16th Century. Despite the troupe's issues and personal problems, they were required to treat one and another with dignity and respect on stage.

Composition of I Gelosi
Member	Character	State of Origin
Francesco Andreini	Capitano Spavento di Vall'Inferna	Pistoia
Isabella Andreini	Prima Donna	Padua
Flaminio Scala	Flavio	Rome
Giulio Pasquati	Pantalone	Padua
Lodovico de Bianchi	Il Dottore Graziano	Bologna
Gabriele delle Haste	Francatrippe	Bologna
Orazio de Nobili	Innamorati	Padua
Silvia Roncagli	Fraceschina	Bergamo
Prudenzia	Seconda Donna	Verona
Adriano Valerini	Aurelio	Verona

=== Travels to France ===
The Gelosi avoided sponsorship from a sole source; this prevented them from being tied down to a single location, allowing them to travel across Europe and spread the style of commedia. They are the first troupe to be heard of in France, which was their most frequent destination and which earned them massive success on separate occasions, despite heavy resistance within the country.

==== 1571 ====
I Gelosi's first recorded travel to France, at the invitation of the Duke of Nevers. Performed in front of English Dukes and Ambassadors, and later King Charles IX. Forced to leave after prohibitions were put in place by Parliament against acting in public, likely to protect the monopoly of the Confrerie de la Passion.

==== 1577–1578 ====
Organized a caravan to travel to France at the behest of King Henri III. The troupe was captured en route by Huguenots, who were embroiled in conflict with the French Government. Henri III ransomed the players, recouping the money lost from admission costs in Lois and Paris. They were again banned from performing by the Confrerie de la Passion, on the basis of vulgarity and bawdry. Henri III again bailed the group out, and they continued performing until their departure in 1578.

==== 1588 ====
Returned again to the court of Henri III. Were again subjected to parliamentary prohibition. Their departure was likely motivated by increasing rebellion amongst the populace, as well as the murder of the Duke of Guise, who was close to Henri III and indicated those within the King's court were not smart to remain.

== See also ==
- I Gelosi – a play by David Bridel

== Bibliography ==
- Barasch, Frances K. "Italian Actresses in Shakespeare's World: Vittoria and Isabella". Shakespeare Bulletin, vol. 19, no. 3, The Johns Hopkins University Press, 2001, pp. 5–9, Italian Actresses in Shakespeare's World: Vittoria and Isabella.
- Bridel, David. I Gelosi. Los Angeles: Original Works Publishing, 2014.
- Ducharte, Pierre Louis. The Italian Comedy. Toronto: General Publishing Company, 1966. 50–101. Print.
- Oreglia, Giacomo (1968). The Commedia dell'arte. Methuen.
- Rudlin, John, and Olly Crick. Commedia Dell’arte: A Handbook for Troupes. London: Routledge, 2001. 14–24. Print.
- Smith, Winifred (1912). The Commedia dell'arte: A Study in Italian Popular Comedy. New York: Columbia University Press. Copy at Google Books; 1964 reprint (with added illustrations): New York: Blom.
