= Laura Guidiccioni =

Italian noblewoman and poet (1550 – c. 1597/9)

- Born: 29 October 1550 Lucca, Tuscany
- Died: c. 1597/9 Florence
- Occupation: Poet

Laura Guidiccioni (née de' Benedetti, 29 October 1550 – c. 1597/9) was an Italian noblewoman and poet.

== Biography ==
Guidiccioni was born on 29 October 1550 into a noble family in Lucca, Tuscany. Her parents were Caterina de' Benedetti and Niccolò de' Benedetti.

Guidiccioni married Orazio Lucchesini and they moved to Florence in 1588. In Florence, Guidiccioni spent time at the ducal court. She composed poetry and collaborated with composer Emilio de' Cavalieri, writing the text for three theatrical projects which he put to music. These project included two pastoral plays called Il Satiro and La Disperatione di Fileno and the allegorical drama La Rappresentazione del Anima e del Corpo (The Representation of the Soul and the Body). All of these works are now lost, but have been described as "progenitors of the operatic genre."

In May 1589, Guidiccioni played a leading role in the entertainment preparations for the grand ducal wedding of Ferdinand I de' Medici and Christina of Lorraine. In June 1589, Guidiccioni's husband was appointed secretary to the Grand Duchess.

Guidiccioni died c. 1597/9 in Florence. After her death, Guidiccioni was commemorated in poems by Isabella Andreini.
