= Fedeli =

Fedeli is an Italian surname. In 2013, there were approximately 1,906 people in Italy with this surname, mainly in Lombardy, Lazio and Tuscany.

== Notable people ==
Notable people with this surname include:

- Alessandro Fedeli (born 1996), Italian former cyclist
- Carlotta Fedeli (born 1992), Italian racing driver
- Filippo Fedeli (born 1983), Italian football player
- Leone Fedeli (died 1613), Roman Catholic prelate
- Matteo de Fedeli (1450–1505), Italian Renaissance painter
- Orlando Fedeli (1933–2010), Brazilian Traditionalist Catholic historian, teacher and political activist
- Valeria Fedeli (1949–2026), Italian politician
- Vic Fedeli (born 1956), Canadian politician

== Businesses ==
- Fedeli (company), textile firm founded by Luigi Fedeli
