= Isabella Andreini =

Italian actress and writer (1562–1604)

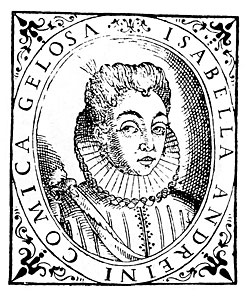
Andreini, 1588 print

Isabella Andreini (born Isabella Canali; 1562 – 10 June 1604), also known as Isabella Da Padova, was an Italian actress and writer. Andreini was a member of the Compagnia dei Comici Gelosi, a touring theatre company that performed in Italy and France. The role of Isabella of the commedia dell'arte was named after her.

== Life ==
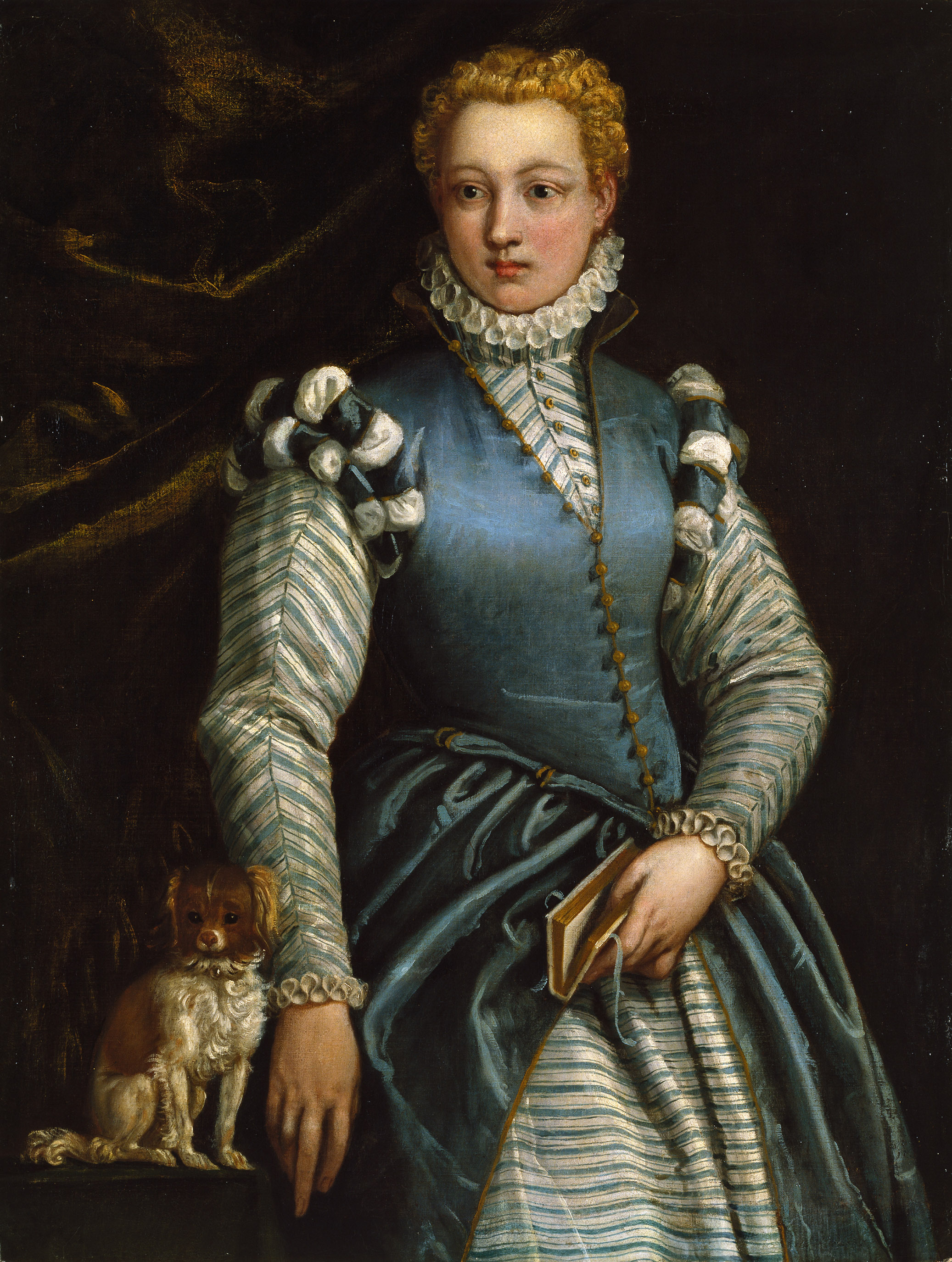
Presumed portrait by Paolo Veronese, c. 1585–1588

Isabella Canali was born in Padua to Venetian parents. Although her family was poor, Andreini received a complete classical education. She was very interested in literary culture and became fluent in several languages which she put to use in her La Pazzia d'Isabella (The Divine Madness of Isabella).

In 1576, at age fourteen, Andreini was hired by the troupe of Flaminio Scala, the Compagnia dei Comici Gelosi. The Gelosi was a well-established theatre company that performed commedia dell'arte. The Gelosi were patronised by the aristocracy of northern Italy, usually performing for the gentry of Italy and France. Henry III of France was fond of the troupe, and Andreini performed for him in those very early years.

From the beginning, Andreini particularly performed the role of the enamoured woman, the prima donna innamorata, and she improvised to create a character that was less dull and more perceptive. She began to improvise and eventually shaped the art form into one of comedic bits and spontaneity. She was one of the women who introduced, developed, and excelled at improvisation. She was daring for the time, sometimes taking off or tearing her clothes onstage. Additionally, Andreini was recognised for her acting flexibility, an important skill for all commedia dell'arte characters, regardless of sex. Andreini played the power dynamics for comedy in her characters; she recognised the importance of her status as the leading actress in a new profession. Andreini worked with the Gelosi until her death.

In 1578, Andreini met and married Francesco Andreini, non-traditionally taking his last name, who would become the director of the Gelosi (1589). Andreini became both the leading lady and an important voice within the Gelosi company. Together with her husband, she managed the troupe's activities and negotiated with potential patrons.

Andreini bore seven children, three boys and four girls, while touring in the Gelosi, and was a dedicated mother. While her firstborn son, Giambattista, continued the theatrical tradition, her other male children were raised by the aristocracy of Mantua, one to become clergy in Italian monasteries, and the other son to become a guard of a duke. She was committed in her duties to motherhood and as wife to Francesco Andreini.

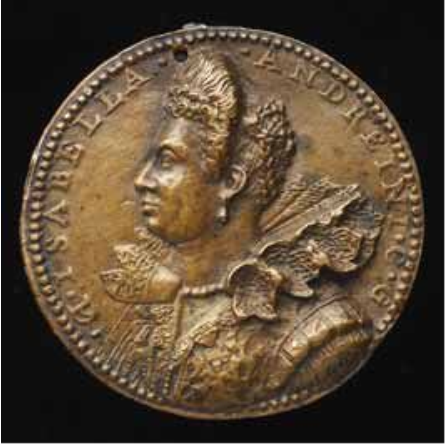
Memorial coin made in honour of Isabella Andreini (1604)

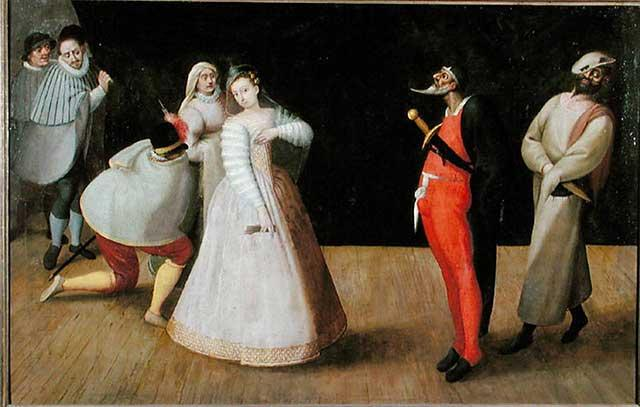
Commedia dell'arte troupe I Gelosi performing, by Hieronymus Francken I, c. 1590, (Musée Carnavalet, Paris). The woman is usually identified as Andreini.

In 1589, Andreini performed her comic work La Pazzia d'Isabella (Isabella's madness) for the Florentine court during the wedding of Ferdinando I de' Medici and Christina of Lorraine, and the details of the mostly improvised play have survived to modern times. Fluent in several languages, she was renowned for her intellectual presentation and refined presence. In this play, she creates madness by using several languages and then imitating the dialects of the other characters. She was versatile in her craft and even referred to herself as being capable of playing any male role. She created the role of Fabrizio, a character used in many of Flaminio Scala's scenarios, where she plays a cross-dressing pageboy. Andreini was noted as having played three different characters in one scenario, showcasing her improvisation skills and her talent.

In 1599, Andreini performed before Henry IV, King of France, and his wife Marie de' Medici. By this point, Andreini was well known enough to be addressed as the "star" performer of the troupe, referred to by Maria de Medici in a letter as "the actress Isabella and her company".

Andreini performed at least once for two other troupes: the Confidenti of the Duke of Mantua in 1589, and the Uniti in 1601.

In 1602, Andreini toured northern Italy, and in 1603 performed again for Henry IV, Marie de' Medici and a local audience at Fontainebleau and Paris. This would be her last tour, because early in 1604 she died near Lyon, on her way back to Italy, when she miscarried her eighth child at age 42. After her state funeral, memorial coins were made in her honour, with one side representing her as a powerful Roman ruler and the other side featuring the Roman goddess Fame and the words aeterna fama.

Although Francesco Andreini dissolved the Gelosi after her death, their son Giambattista Andreini, who was an actor and a playwright, started his own company, the Fedeli, with the original troupe of the Gelosi.

== Literary works ==
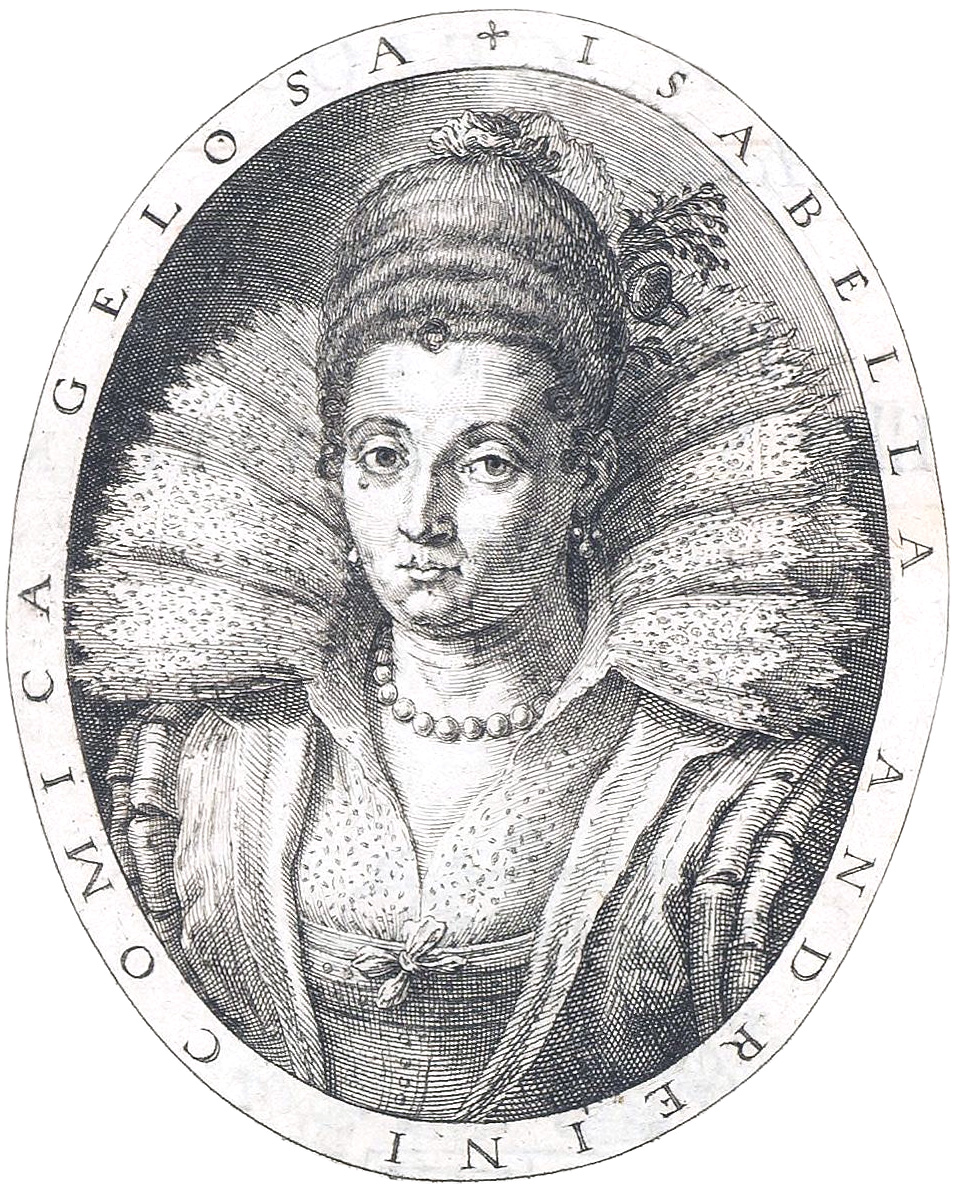
Portrait from Rime, engraved by Raphael Sadeler, 1602

Besides performing on stage, Isabella Andreini was a recognised intellectual who dedicated much of her time to literature. The themes of her plays were shaded with some notions questioning the situation of the woman in the society of that epoch; she wrote with a masculine voice in her creations that showed her virtue. She is considered one of the more successful female playwrights of her time, which is attributed to her time on stage as an actress. In one of her most notable works, La Mirtilla (1588), Andreini was able to address controversial and taboo topics regarding women and queerness. Through this play, she addresses the power, self-awareness, and independence of women as well as deep and supportive female relationships. Further, she explores the idea of lesbianism through the character of Ardelia. She was able to intertwine proto-feminist ideas of gender and sexuality while meeting the complicated theatrical elements of pastoral dramas. Other female playwrights also started to introduce these ideas; however, Andreini's golden reputation and growing popularity allowed her to address these topics without the repercussions. Thus, she was able to use her large platform to bring light to the matter.

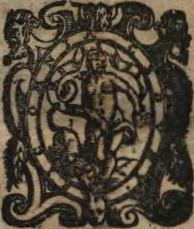
Page 2 of Isabella Andreini's La Mirtilla (1602)

Indeed, after publishing Mirtilla, she began corresponding with contemporary intellectuals, attending their forums, and – an uncommon achievement for a woman in her era – in 1601 she was integrated into the literary society of the Accademia degli Intenti of Pavia, for which she adopted the nickname of Accesa. In a poetry contest held by the Cardinal Giorgio Cinthio Aldobrandini of Rome, Isabella Andreini attained second place, only behind the Renaissance poet Torquato Tasso. Like Tasso, both Gabriello Chiabrera and Giambattista Marino have praised her.

Some may argue that Andreini's writings were just as impressive, if not far more impressive, than her theatrical performances on the stage. Andreini highlighted subjects in her literary works that were not only extremely taboo but often severely underexplored. Andreini highlighted self-expression, erotic nature, gender identity, and sexuality in several of her pieces; the most famous piece being Rime D'Isabella Andreini Padouana Comica Gelosa, which highlights the eroticization of madness through a focus on sexuality and the body.

Apart from writing plays, Isabella also wrote poetry and corresponded with a great variety of people. She commemorated fellow poet Laura Guidiccioni after her death.

== Legacy ==
Poets and a number of composers and musicians left tributes in her honour. Gherardo Borgogni, a poet and literary editor, began writing verses honouring Andreini at the start of her literary career, and the two of them would end up exchanging verses for nearly twenty years. These verses for Andreini became the source of lyrics for future musical tributes. The earliest known musical tribute for Andreini was composed by Leone Leoni, and he used the Borgogni verses titled Tu pur ti parti, o Filli, and Dimmi Filli gradita. Other notable composers include Serafino Cantone, who was a Benedictine monk, and Peter Philips, who was an English composer. Andreini inspired many French poets, notably Isaac du Ryer (d. c. 1631).

Andreini was known and infamous because of her intimacy onstage. She connected with people and used complex characteristics to make her characters realistic and relatable.

Andreini and Inglis (a well-known French actress at the time) demonstrate that early modern women who were neither aristocratic or particularly wealthy could labour and think transnationally and be appreciated for it. Both travelled widely and on a regular basis, though Andreini's theatrical job allowed her to do so more frequently. Both became well known among Europe's cultural elite.

The commedia dell'arte "lover" stock character, Isabella, was named from Andreini's most famous character and used by subsequent commedia dell'arte troupes. In particular, this school of theatre has studied the posthumous works of Andreini, Rime, Parte seconda and Fragmenti de alcune scritture.

Many women in early commedia dell'arte troupes are credited with advancing much of the improvisational tools used by the art form; Andreini is included in this legacy as a performer in the Gelosi troupe.

== Publications ==
- Her sonnets were published in diverse Italian books of anthology (since 1587).
- Mirtilla, a pastoral drama, with some feminist advocacy (1588).
- Rime, a collection of 359 poems (1601, in Italian language). In 1603, the French version was published for her tour of France.
- Rime..., Parte seconda (posthumous, 1605).
- Lettere di Isabella Andreini padovana comica gelosa, a collection of fictional correspondence, about her personal life and art in general, for being performed as monologues onstage (posthumous, 1607).
- Fragmenti de alcune scritture, a collection of improvised dialogues (contrasti) of Isabella's Inamorati characters, gathered by her husband (posthumous, 1617).

== See also ==
- Vittoria Piisimi
