= Isabella (commedia dell'arte) =

Stock character used in commedia dell'arte

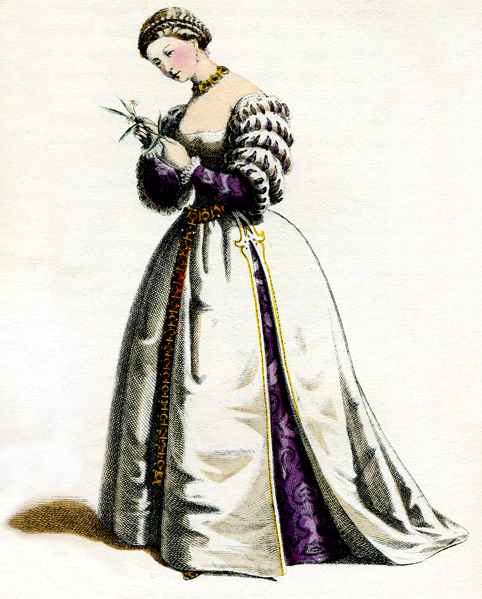
Drawing of Isabella by Maurice Sand

Isabella is a stock character used in commedia dell'arte, in the class of innamorata (female lover). In the commedia dell'arte, the relationship of the innamorati, or lovers, is often threatened by the vecchi (old men) characters, but they are reunited in the end. In his 1929 book The Italian Comedy, Pierre Louis Duchartre writes that Isabella changed from being mainly tender and loving in the 16th century to a more flirtatious and strong-willed woman with a "lively, picturesque wit" by the end of the 17th century.

Although actress Vittoria degli Amorevoli also played an innamoratta named Isabella in the 16th century, the character Isabella is named to honour the actress and writer Isabella Andreini of the commedia troupe I Gelosi, who popularized the role. Later, Isabella was played by Françoise Biancolelli of the Biancolelli acting family.
