= Museo Teatrale alla Scala =

Theatrical museum and library in Milan, Italy

Coordinates: 45.4673°N 9.1892°E

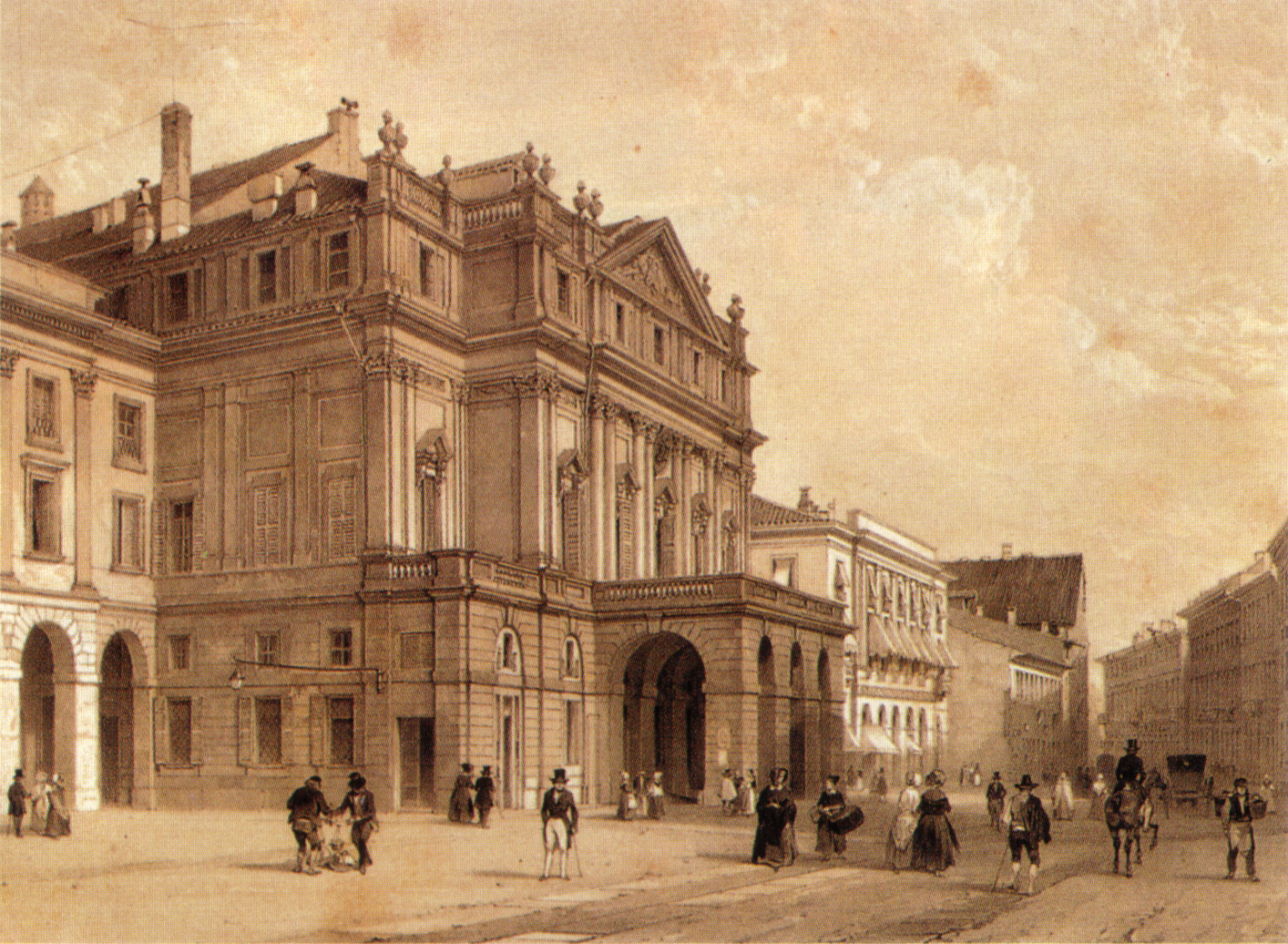
- A nineteenth-century depiction of the opera house in the Piazza della Scala
- Established: 1913
- Location: Largo Ghiringhelli 1, Milan, 20121 Milan – Italy
- Director: Donatella Brunazzi

The Museo Teatrale alla Scala is a theatrical museum and library attached to the Teatro alla Scala in Milan, Italy. Although it has a particular focus on the history of opera and of that opera house, its scope extends to Italian theatrical history in general, and includes displays relating, for example, to the commedia dell'arte and to the famous stage actress Eleonora Duse.

The museum, which is adjacent to the opera house in the Piazza della Scala, was opened on 8 March 1913 and was based on a large private collection which had been purchased at auction two years earlier, with funds raised both from government and private sources. The displays include costumes, set designs, autograph scores, and musical instruments of historical interest as well as paintings of musicians and actors, and a range of related paraphernalia including precious ceramic figures portraying characters from the commedia dell'arte, and board games which used to be played in the theatre's foyer.

The Biblioteca Livia Simoni, the museum's library, is situated on the II floor of the museum. It was formed in 1952 with 40,000 volumes donated by author and Corriere della Sera critic Renato Simoni; it is named in honour of his mother. Today it holds some 140,000 works related to theatre history, opera and ballet including librettos, periodicals and the correspondence of musicians, actors and dancers, as well as books.

== See also ==
- List of music museums
