= Orlando Fedeli =

Brazilian traditionalist Catholic

Orlando Fedeli (São Paulo, 7 February 1933 – São Paulo, 9 June 2010) was a Brazilian Traditionalist Catholic historian, teacher and political activist. He was the founder and president of the Montfort Cultural Association, in 1983.

== Biography ==
Fedeli was born to Italian parents. He studied at Dom Bosco College, of Salesian priests, and at Our Lady of Carmo College, of the Marist Brothers. After serving in the army, he studied at the Pontifical Catholic University of São Paulo, where he graduated in History in 1954. He also took a doctorate in History by the University of São Paulo. He was a teacher in several secondary schools in São Paulo and at the Pontifical Catholic University of São Paulo.

A follower of Plinio Corrêa de Oliveira, he was a member of the Tradition, Family, Property organization for more than thirty years but he left it and became one of his harshest critics, as well of his offshoot, the Heralds of the Gospel.

He was a Traditionalist Catholic and a critic of the Vatican Council II, which he considered to have been influenced by theological modernism, and his innovations, like the adoption of the concepts of religious freedom and ecumenism. He was also very critical of the Catholic Charismatic Renewal and in particular of the Canção Nova (New Song) movement. He opposed above all the Liberation Theology and the leftist inclinations of the National Conference of Bishops of Brazil. A supporter of the Latin Mass, he praised Pope Benedict XVI apostolic letter Summorum Pontificum.

He published four books, Nos Labirintos de Eco (2005), his interpretation of Umberto Eco's novel The Name of the Rose, Carta a Um Padre (2007), where he strongly criticizes the Vatican Council II, Antropoteísmo: a Religião do Homem (2011), concerning esoterism during universal History, and No País das Maravilhas: a Gnose Burlesca da TFP e dos Arautos do Evangelho (2012), where he accuses TFP and the Heralds of the Gospel of being esoteric cults.
