= Flaminio Scala =

Italian playwright and stage actor

- Born: 27 September 1552; Rome, Papal States
- Died: 9 December 1624 (aged 72); Mantua, Duchy of Mantua
- Other names: Flavio, Claudione
- Occupations: Commedia dell'arte actor; scenario writer; playwright; director; producer; manager; agent; perfumier
- Notable work: Il Teatro delle Favole Rappresentative (1611)

Flaminio Scala (27 September 1552 – 9 December 1624), commonly known by his stage name Flavio, was an Italian stage actor of commedia dell'arte, scenario writer, playwright, director, producer, manager, agent, and editor. Considered one of the most important figures in Renaissance theatre, Scala is remembered today as the author of the first published collection of commedia scenarios, Il Teatro delle Favole Rappresentative, short comic plays that served as inspiration to playwrights such as Lope de Vega, William Shakespeare, Ben Jonson, and Molière.

== Career ==
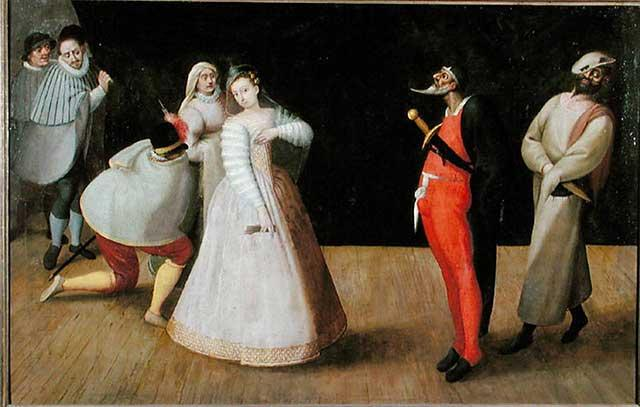
Commedia dell'arte troupe I Gelosi performing, by Hieronymus Francken I, c. 1590, Musée Carnavalet, Paris

Scala's career as an actor began sometime prior to 1577 in Florence, where he is thought to have played the role of the innamorato in the Compagnia dei Comici Gelosi (1568–1604), whose name was established after the company's creed: Virtù, fama ed honor ne fèr gelosi (lit. 'We are jealous of attaining virtue, fame, and honour'). However, c. 1610, Scala became the company's resident stock character, Flavio. Much of the company had been made up of actors who were seeking work after separating themselves from Ganassa. Scala also held the position as director with the Ganassa Company from 1571 up until practicing under Francesco Andreini in 1577. Members of the company included Vittoria Piisimi, Isabella Arreini, Lodovico da Bologna, Giulio Pasquati, Simone da Bologna, Gabriele Panzanini, Orazio Nobili and a host of other notable playmakers. Records also show that Scala also invested his time into another theatre company under the name Confidenti, which also ended up being successful. Confidenti made a home for itself in France in the year 1571. While the company had established a positive reputation for itself, much of its members were shareholders. This stock character made up the male half of the pair of young lovers that were central to the plots of scenarios in Italian commedia dell'arte. Typically, the innamorati were as much in love with one another as they were with themselves and frequently kept apart by circumstances outside their control.

Scala is credited with bringing the famous sixteenth-century actress and poet Isabella Andreini into I Gelosi to play opposite him as his inamorata, making him considered the stage's first professional producer. Isabella, the sixteen-year-old wife of the actor Francesco Andreini (whose stage name was Capitan Spavento), went on to become such a celebrated actress in her own right that a new role known as the Isabella was created in her honor. She later died while traveling from Paris to Italy in 1604. Following his work with I Gelosi, Scala was associated as an actor and occasionally as an agent with the i Accesi (Stimulated Ones), i Desiosi, (Desired Ones), and i Uniti (United Ones) from 1579 through 1596.

== Staging and portraying Scala's work ==
Scala's writings called for a specific facility in order for his scenarios to be performed – they called for a great amount of jeux de scene. Within the style and staging of Scala's works, he understood commedia dell'arte was a very expressive and physical art form and furthers the importance of expressive body and facial gestures. Scala provided the lines and written language for the verbal aspect of the performance, but the portrayal also requires a very physicalized manner. Actors should understand that there are essential movements and skills involved in the staging of some stock characters that Scala uses in his work; physical skills such as sword handling, dancing, singing, and the use of musical instruments might need to be known and used. Another important aspect that Scala emphasized is the use of facial expressions, with or without a mask on the actor. Masks were worn for some stock characters, such as Burattino, but sometimes the mask would not cover the full face, or the mask would need to be used in such a way to really accentuate the facial features and movements of the character's head. Thus, the importance of gesturing in the face and with the body is needed for fully portraying Scala's work.

== Personal life ==
Scala was born in Rome, Italy, on 27 September 1552. Little is known about his early life and his aristocratic family, except that his father's name was Giacomo. Scala is thought to have one recorded child, a daughter named, Orsola. Orsola is documented to be an active actress, normally playing the role of Flaminia, a play on femininity of Scala's first name.

== The Scala Collections ==
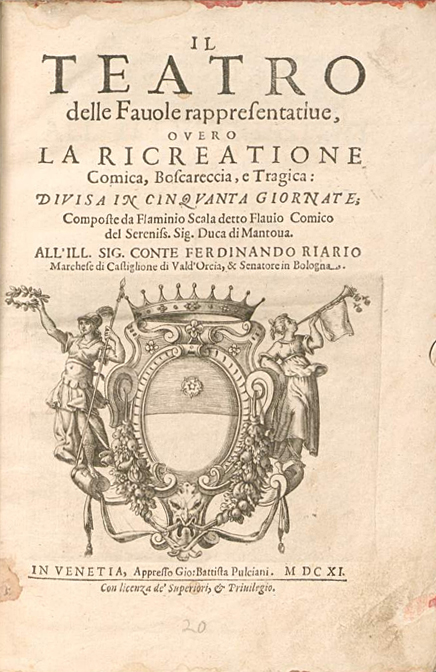
Title page of Il teatro delle favole rappresentative (1611)

In 1611 Scala published the first collection of Scenarios of the Commedia dell'Arte plays, under the title Il Teatro delle Favole Rappresentative, also called the Scala collection. Out of the fifty scenarios, only one is considered a tragedy, nine are considered elaborate fantasies and the remaining forty are comedies. Scala's approach to creating was unique. His scenarios did not require dialogue. The scenarios only provide in detail the action to be done by the actor. It is unknown as to why Scala chose to format his work like this. Evidence suggests that the Scala collection may have been written to cater to both actors and recreational readers. Between the seventeenth and eighteenth century's collections, documentation proves that 750 canovacci have survived over time. The collection has been translated into English by Henry F. Salerno in 1967 as Scenarios of the Commedia dell'Arte. A new Italian edition edited by Ferruccio Marotti was published in 1976. A new partial translation (30 scenarios out of 50) by Richard Andrews was published in 2008.

== Appearance in popular culture ==
Scala is represented in the 2007 musical The Glorious Ones, with book and music by Lynn Ahrens and Stephen Flaherty. The New York production was based on Francine Prose's 1974 novel of the same name. During the musical's original Pittsburgh run, Flaminio Scala was played by Paul Schoeffler. For the New York run, the role was played by Marc Kudisch. In the Canadian premiere by the Toronto Civic-Light Opera Co., Scala was played by the company's artistic director, Joe Cascone.

Dominic Peloso published set of 211 interlinked sonnets (known as a crown of sonnets) titled "Sonnets of the Commedia dell'Arte" in 2023, based on the scenarios in Flaminio Scala's work Il Teatro delle Favole Rappresentative.

== Influence of popular culture in Scala's work ==
Flaminio Scala worked with commedia dell'arte in the sixteenth and early seventeenth century in Europe. At this time, audiences were seeking out ways to cope with stress and dissociate from lives in which they felt trapped by "widespread dissimulation" (Schmitt, 2015). Scala related much of his work to the topic of dissimulation which had become so prevalent and this connection can be seen in multiple ways throughout his work (Schmitt, 2015).

== Bibliography ==
- Cappelletti, Salvatore (2008). "Flaminio Scala (27 September 1552-9 December 1624)", pp. 244–249 in Seventeenth-Century Italian Poets and Dramatists. Dictionary of Literary Biography, volume 339, edited by Albert N. Mancini and Glenn Palen Pierce. Detroit: Gale Cengage Learning. ISBN 9780787681579.
- Isherwood, Charles (6 November 2007). "Those Smutty, Nutty Kids With Heart, Treading the Boards in Merry Olde Italy". New York Times.
- Landolfi, Domenica (1993). "Flaminio Scala", pp. 437–449 in Comici dell'Arte: Corrispondenze G. B. Andreini, N. Barbieri, P. M. Cechini, S. Fiorillo, T. Martinelli, F. Scala, edited by Claudia Burattelli, Domenica Landolfi, and Anna Zinanni. Florence: Le Lettere. ISBN 9788871660868.
- Scala, Flaminio (1611). Il teatro delle favole rappresentative, overo La ricreatione comica, boscareccia, e tragica: Divisa in cinquanta giornate, composte da Flaminio Scala detto Flavia Comico del Sereniss. Sig. Duca di Mantova. [The Theater of Tales for Performance, or for Comic, Rustic, and Tragic Recreation, Divided into Fifty Days, and Composed by Flaminio Scala, Named Flavio, Comedian of the Most Serene Lord Duke of Mantua]. Venice: Giovanni Battista Pulciani. Copy at Bavarian State Library website.
- Scala, Flaminio; Salerno, Henry F., translator (1967). Scenarios of the Commedia dell'Arte: Flaminio Scala's Il Teatro delle Favole Rappresentative, foreword by Kenneth McKee. New York: New York University Press. OCLC 186077.
- Scala, Flaminio; Marotti, Ferruccio, editor (1976). Il Teatro delle Favole Rappresentative. Milan: Il Polifilo. OCLC 2856429, 898901306.
- Scala, Flaminio; Andrews, Richard, translator (2008). The Commedia dell'arte of Flaminio Scala: A Translation and Analysis of 30 Scenarios. Lanham, MD: Scarecrow Press. ISBN 9780810863606.
- Schmitt, Natalie Crohn. "The Style of Commedia dell'Arte Acting: Observations Drawn from the Scenarios of Flaminio Scala." New Theatre Quarterly, vol. 28, no. 4, 2012, pp. 325–333. doi:10.1017/s0266464x12000620.
- Schmitt. (2015). Dissimulation in the Commedia dell'Arte Scenarios of Flaminio Scala, 1611. New Theatre Quarterly, 31(4), 312–328. https://doi.org/10.1017/S0266464X15000640.
