= Adriano Valerini =

Italian actor

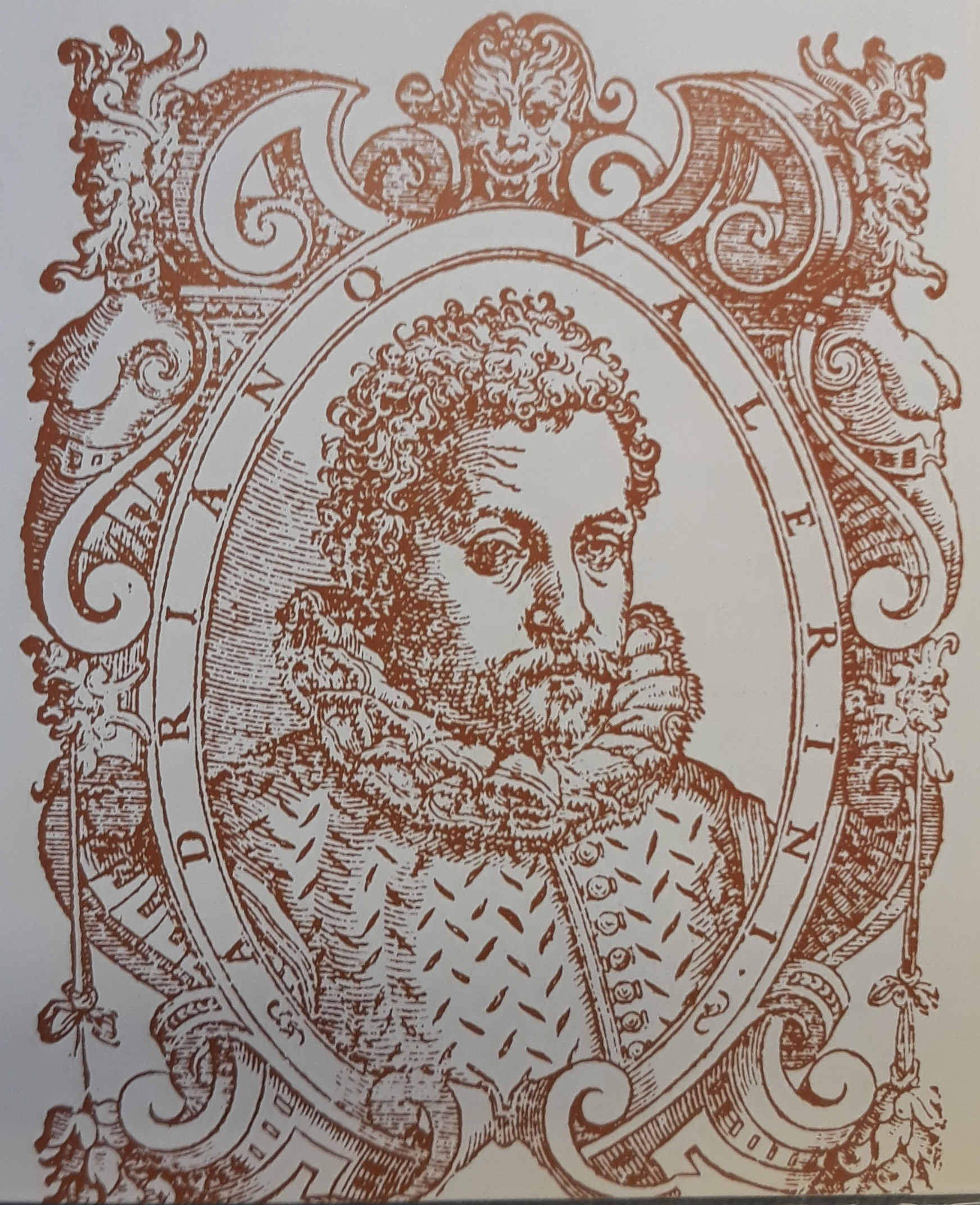
Adriano Valerini

Adriano Valerini (active circa 1560-died 1590s) was an Italian actor of Commedia dell'arte, active in Northern Italy.

He was born in Verona, and could read Latin and Greek. He was the head of a company of actors. In Milan, he fell under the censorship of Charles Borromeo. He has published a tragic play l'Afrodite, nearly one hundred madrigals, a funeral oration for the fellow comic and possible mistress Vincenza Armani, and the play Belleze di Verona. He was the father of Diana Ponti. The writer Flaminio Valerini was in his family.
