= Francesco Andreini =

Italian actor (c. 1548 – 1624)

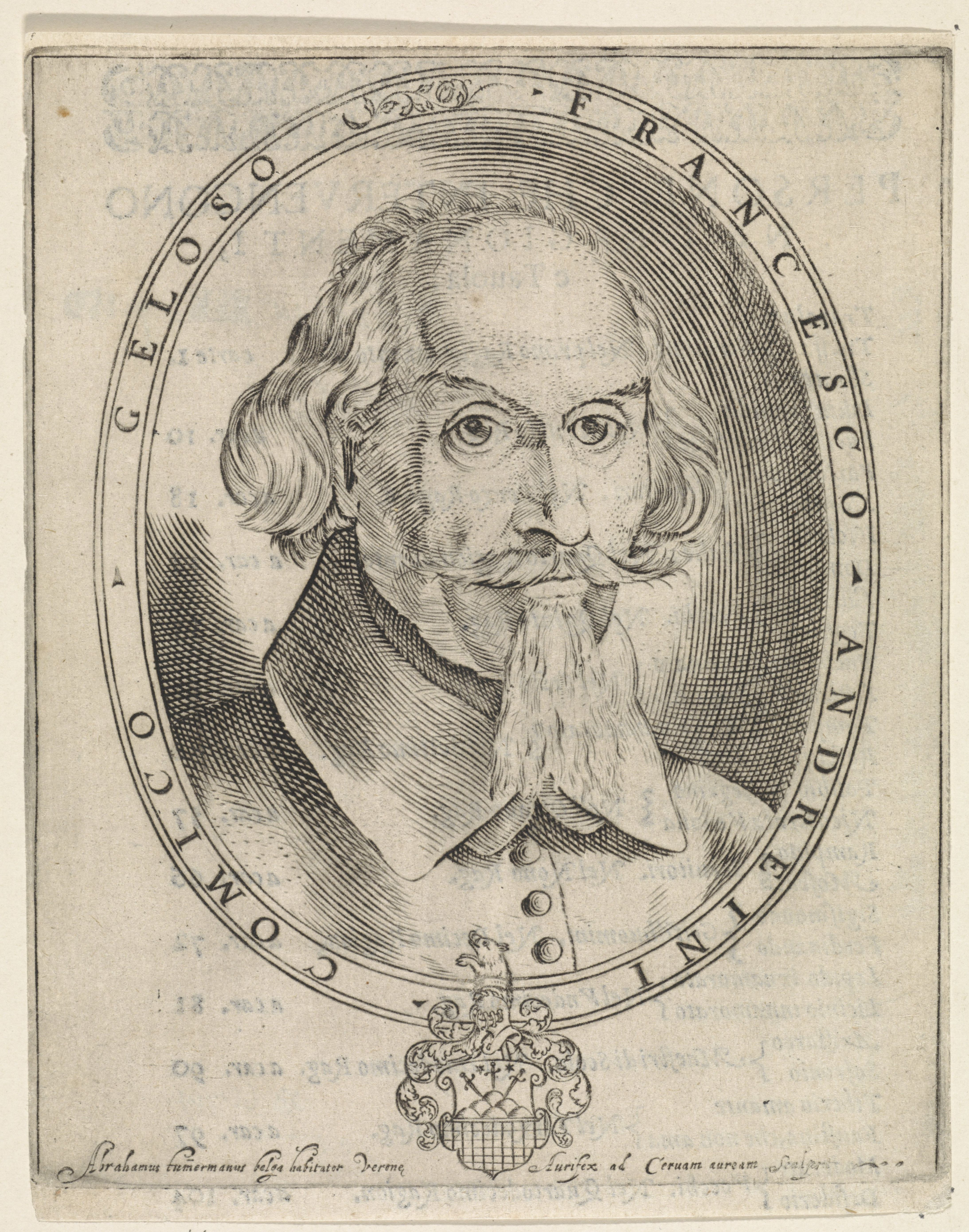
Francesco Andreini, c. 1612

Francesco Andreini (c. 1548 – 1624) was an Italian actor mainly of commedia dell'arte plays. He began his career playing the role of the unsophisticated love-stricken young man. Later, he played the role of Capitan Spavento (lit. 'Captain Fright'), a Pickwickian character of excessive fatigue. He died on January 1, 1624, in Mantua, Italy at the age of 76.

Francesco Andreini was the leader of the Gelosi commedia dell'arte troupe, and had he not brought this type of theatre elsewhere, it would not have made it further to the mainstream media and developed into multilingualism and oral and textual transmissions. His role as Capitano made its way into modern media with adapted versions solely based on the original Capitano. Francesco had an impact on today's theatre and improvisation.

== Life ==
Andreini was a soldier under the banner of the Medici in the Ottoman–Venetian War. He turned to theatre after 8 years in a Turkish jail.

Andreini was born at Pistoia. He was a member of the company of I Gelosi which Henry IV of France summoned to Paris for his bride, the young queen Marie de' Medici, thus introducing the commedia dell'arte style to France.

Andreini married sixteen-year-old Isabella Canali in 1578, when he was 30. She and their son, Giambattista Andreini, were also distinguished in the arts.

== Accomplishments ==
He published his dialogue as Captain Spavento as "La bravura del Capitano Spavento". This dialogue takes place between the captain and his servant, Trappola. Francesco Andreini wrote four to five page boasts in his publication of his dialogue; although Andreini may have elaborated on these speeches in print, it is clear that he was trying to give the audience the intense verbosity within. Similarly, Andreini elaborates on the fact that the doctor was only talk, while the lovers could get carried away with themselves to any extent.

Andreini spoke a handful of languages, including Italian, Turkish, English and French. He used a combination of these languages while performing. As Capitano, he often combined Italian and Turkish, claiming it was Arabic. He also used Grammelot in his works and was one of the original inventors.

== Bibliography ==
- Boni, Filippo de' (1852). Biografia degli artisti ovvero dizionario della vita e delle opere dei pittori, degli scultori, degli intagliatori, dei tipografi e dei musici di ogni nazione che fiorirono da'tempi più remoti sino á nostri giorni. Seconda Edizione.. Venice; Googlebooks: Presso Andrea Santini e Figlio. p. 8.

Attribution:
