= Actor =

Person who portrays a character in a production

An actor (masculine/gender-neutral), or actress (feminine), is a person who portrays a character in a production. The actor performs "in the flesh" in the traditional medium of the theatre or in modern media such as film, radio, and television. The analogous Greek term is ὑποκριτής (hupokritḗs), literally "one who answers". The actor's interpretation of a role—the art of acting pertains to the role played, whether based on a real person or fictional character. This can also be considered an "actor's role", which was called this due to scrolls being used in the theaters. Interpretation occurs even when the actor is "playing themselves", as in some forms of experimental performance art.

Formerly, in ancient Greece and the medieval world, and in England at the time of William Shakespeare, only men could become actors, and women's roles were generally played by men or boys. While Ancient Rome did allow female stage performers, only a small minority of them were given speaking parts. The commedia dell'arte of Italy, however, allowed professional women to perform early on; Lucrezia Di Siena, whose name is on a contract of actors from 10 October 1564, has been referred to as the first Italian actress known by name, with Vincenza Armani and Barbara Flaminia as the first primadonnas and the first well-documented actresses in Italy (and in Europe). After the English Restoration of 1660, women began to appear onstage in England. In modern times, particularly in pantomime and some operas, women occasionally play the roles of boys or young men.

== Terminology ==
While the word actor has existed for much of the history of English language, as to mean "one who does something", it was not used to refer to one who performs in theatre until the 16th century.

The profession of acting possesses a significant amount of terminology, some of which is historically or contemporaneously contentious. This includes the term actress and less common player.

=== The term "actress" ===
According to the OED, the earliest recorded occurrence of the term "actress" in reference to stage performance came in 1608 in the anonymous play Famelie of Love. Seventeenth-century English writers sometimes used the forms "actoress" or "actoresse" to refer to a female appearing on stage. In the 19th century, many people viewed women in acting negatively, as actresses were often courtesans; females on stage had become associated with promiscuity. Despite such prejudices, the 19th century also saw early female stage "stars", most notably Sarah Bernhardt.

After 1660, when women first started to appear on stage regularly in England, the terms actor or actress initially applied interchangeably to female performers, but later, influenced by the French actrice, actress became the common term for women in theater and film. The etymology derives from actor with -ess added. When referring to groups of performers of both sexes, actors is preferred.

Within the acting profession, the re-adoption of "actor" as a gender-neutral term dates to the post-war period of the 1950s and '60s, when the contributions of women to cultural life in general came under scrutiny. When The Observer and The Guardian published their new joint style-guide in 2010, it stated "Use ['actor'] for both male and female actors; do not use actress except when in name of award, e.g. Oscar for best actress". The guide's authors stated that "actress comes into the same category as authoress, comedienne, manageress, 'lady doctor', 'male nurse' and similar obsolete terms that date from a time when professions were largely the preserve of one sex (usually men)." (See male as norm.) Whoopi Goldberg stated: "An actress can only play a woman. I'm an actor – I can play anything." The UK performers' trade-union Equity has no policy on the use of "actor" or "actress". An Equity spokesperson said that the union does not believe that there is a consensus on the matter and stated that the "... subject divides the profession". In 2009, the Los Angeles Times stated that "Actress" remains the common term used in major acting awards given to female recipients (e.g., Academy Award for Best Actress).

=== Players ===
With regard to the cinema of the United States, the gender-neutral term "player" was common in the silent film era and the early days of the Motion Picture Production Code, but in the 2000s in a film context, it is generally deemed archaic. However, "player" remains in use in the theatre, often incorporated into the name of a theatre group or company, such as the American Players, the East West Players, etc. Also, actors in improvisational theatre may be referred to as "players".

== History ==
=== Antiquity ===
The first recorded case of a performing actor occurred in 534 BC (though the changes in the calendar over the years make it hard to determine exactly) when the Greek performer Thespis stepped onto the stage at the Theatre Dionysus to become the first known person to speak words as a character in a play or story. Before Thespis' act, Grecian stories were only expressed in song, dance, and in third person narrative. In honor of Thespis, actors are commonly called Thespians. The exclusively male actors in the theatre of ancient Greece performed in three types of drama: tragedy, comedy, and the satyr play. This developed and expanded considerably under the Romans. The theatre of ancient Rome was a thriving and diverse art form, ranging from festival performances of street theatre, nude dancing, and acrobatics, to the staging of situation comedies, to high-style, verbally elaborate tragedies.

=== Middle ages ===
As the Western Roman Empire fell into decay through the 4th and 5th centuries, the seat of Roman power was moved eastward to Constantinople. Records show that mime, pantomime, scenes or recitations from tragedies and comedies, dances, and other entertainments were very popular. From the 5th century, Western Europe was plunged into a period of general disorder. Small nomadic bands of actors traveled around Europe throughout the period, performing wherever they could find an audience; there is no evidence that they produced anything but crude scenes. Traditionally, actors were not of high status; therefore, in the Early Middle Ages, traveling acting troupes were often viewed with distrust. Early Middle Ages actors were denounced by the Church during the Dark Ages, as they were viewed as dangerous, immoral, and pagan. In many parts of Europe, traditional beliefs of the region and time meant actors could not receive a Christian burial.

In the Early Middle Ages, churches in Europe began staging dramatized versions of biblical events. By the middle of the 11th century, liturgical drama had spread from Russia to Scandinavia to Italy. The Feast of Fools encouraged the development of comedy. In the Late Middle Ages, plays were produced in 127 towns. These vernacular Mystery plays often contained comedy, with actors playing devils, villains, and clowns. The majority of actors in these plays were drawn from the local population. Amateur performers in England were exclusively male, but other countries had female performers.

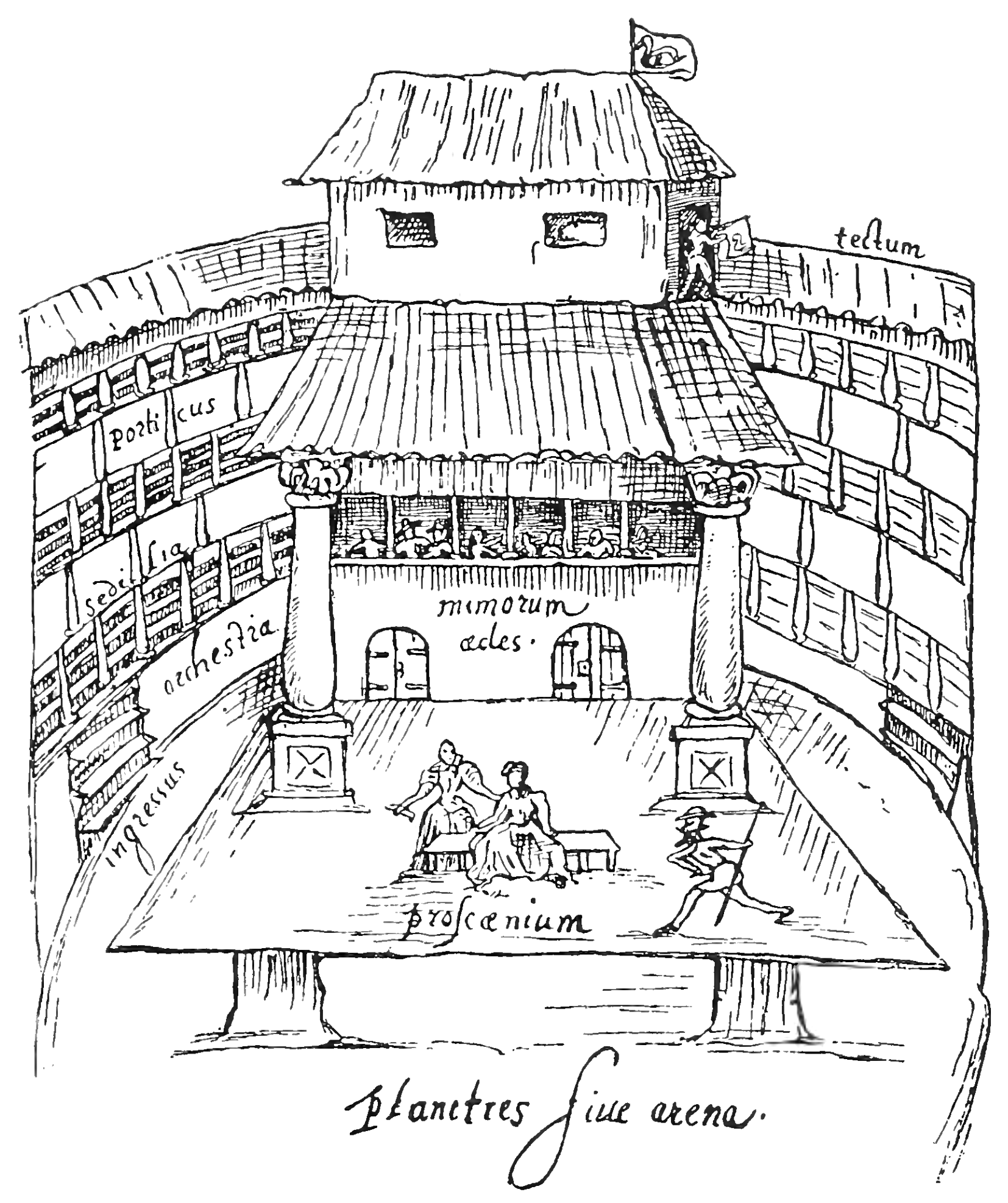
A 1596 sketch of a performance in progress on the thrust stage of The Swan, an Elizabethan open-roof playhouse.

There were several secular plays staged in the Middle Ages, the earliest of which is The Play of the Greenwood by Adam de la Halle in 1276. It contains satirical scenes and folk material such as faeries and other supernatural occurrences. Farces also rose in popularity after the 13th century. At the end of the Late Middle Ages, professional actors began to appear in England and Europe. Richard III and Henry VII both maintained small companies of professional actors. Beginning in the mid-16th century, Commedia dell'arte troupes performed lively improvisational playlets across Europe for centuries. Commedia dell'arte was an actor-centred theatre, requiring little scenery and very few props. Plays were loose frameworks that provided situations, complications, and the outcome of the action, around which the actors improvised. The plays used stock characters. A troupe typically consisted of 13 to 14 members. Most actors were paid a share of the play's profits roughly equivalent to the sizes of their roles.

=== Early modern era ===
Renaissance theatre derived from several medieval theatre traditions, such as the mystery plays, "morality plays", and the "university drama" that attempted to recreate Athenian tragedy. The Italian tradition of Commedia dell'arte, as well as the elaborate masques frequently presented at court, also contributed to the shaping of public theatre. Since before the reign of Elizabeth I, companies of players were attached to the households of leading aristocrats and performed seasonally in various locations. These became the foundation for the professional players that performed on the Elizabethan stage.

The development of the theatre and opportunities for acting ceased when Puritan opposition to the stage banned the performance of all plays within London. Puritans viewed the theatre as immoral. The re-opening of the theatres in 1660 signalled a renaissance of English drama. English comedies written and performed in the Restoration period from 1660 to 1710 are collectively called "Restoration comedy". Restoration comedy is notorious for its sexual explicitness. At this point, women were allowed for the first time to appear on the English stage, exclusively in female roles. This period saw the introduction of the first professional actresses and the rise of the first celebrity actors.

=== 19th century ===
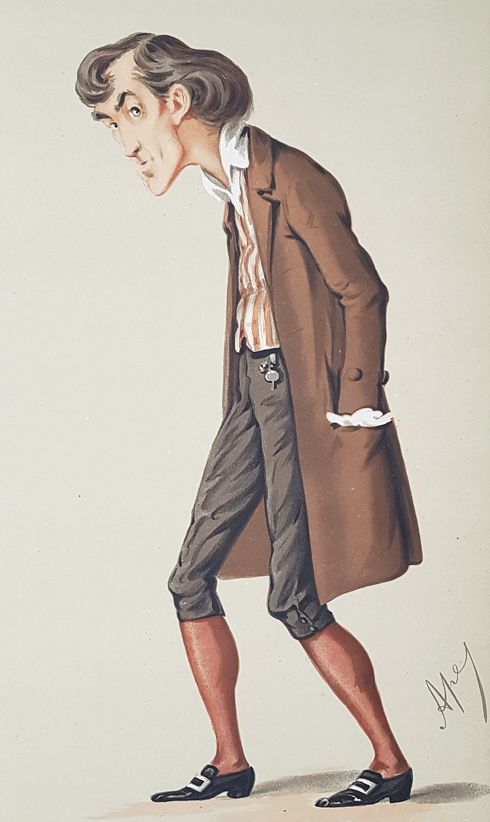
Henry Irving in The Bells, 1874

In the 19th century the negative reputation of actors was largely reversed, and acting became an honored, popular profession and art. The rise of the actor as celebrity provided the transition, as audiences flocked to their favorite "stars". A new role emerged for the actor-managers, who formed their own companies and controlled the actors, the productions, and the financing. When successful, they built up a permanent clientele that flocked to their productions. They could enlarge their audience by going on tour across the country, performing a repertoire of well-known plays, such as those by Shakespeare. The newspapers, private clubs, pubs, and coffee shops rang with lively debates evaluating the relative merits of the stars and the productions. Henry Irving (1838–1905) was the most successful of the British actor-managers. Irving was renowned for his Shakespearean roles, and for such innovations as turning out the house lights so that attention could focus more on the stage and less on the audience. His company toured across Britain, as well as Europe and the United States, demonstrating the power of star actors and celebrated roles to attract enthusiastic audiences. His knighthood in 1895 indicated full acceptance into the higher circles of British society.

=== 20th century ===
By the early 20th century, the economics of large-scale productions displaced the actor-manager model. It was too hard to find people who combined a genius at acting as well as management, so specialization divided the roles as stage managers and later theatre directors emerged. Financially, much larger capital was required to operate out of a major city. The solution was corporate ownership of chains of theatres, such as by the Theatrical Syndicate, Edward Laurillard, and especially The Shubert Organization. By catering to tourists, theaters in large cities increasingly favored long runs of highly popular plays, especially musicals. Big name stars became even more essential.

== Techniques ==
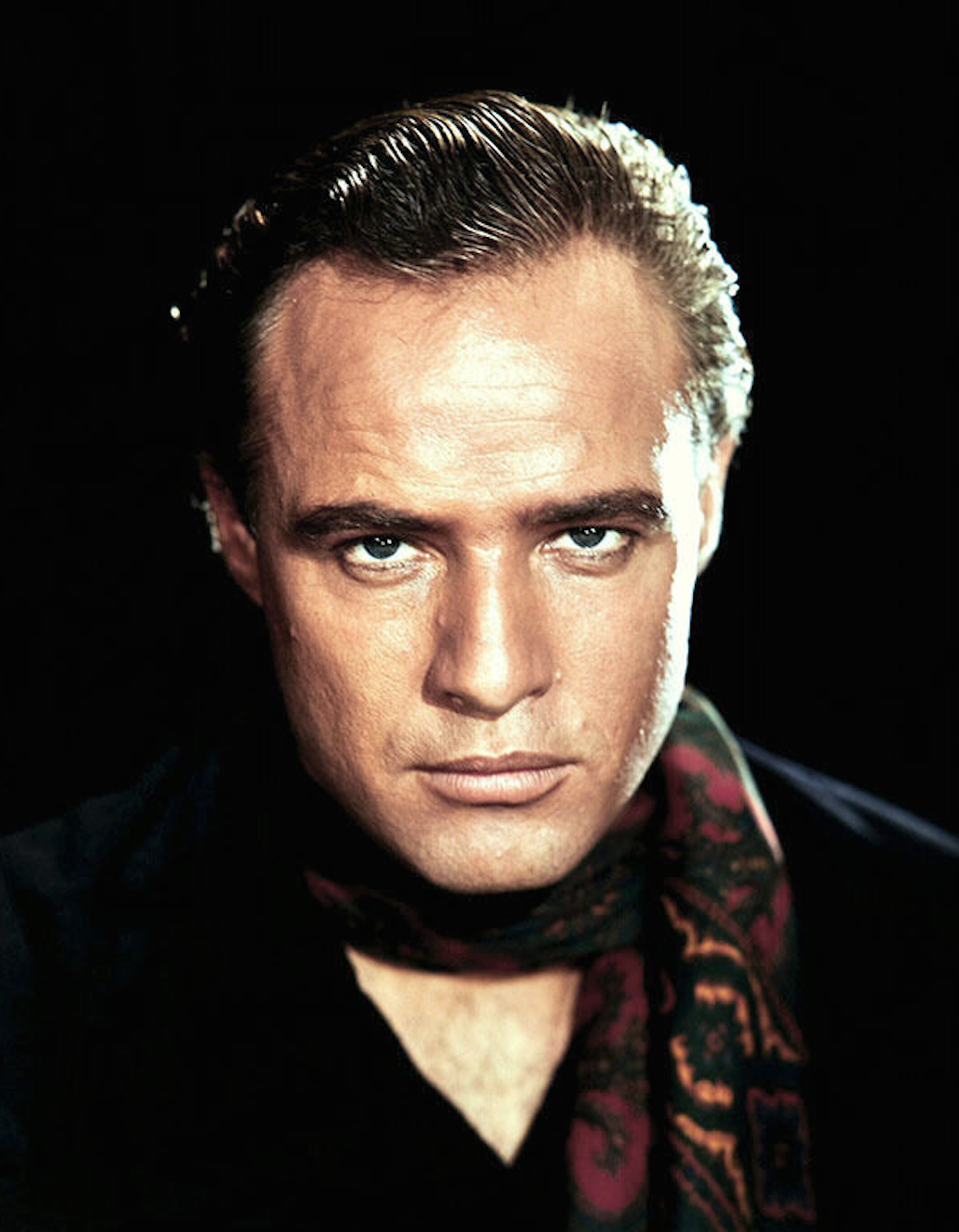
Despite personally abhorring Strasburg and his teachings, Marlon Brando is well known for his use of method acting.

- Classical acting is a philosophy of acting that integrates the expression of the body, voice, imagination, personalizing, improvisation, external stimuli, and script analysis. It is based on the theories and systems of select classical actors and directors including Konstantin Stanislavski and Michel Saint-Denis.
- In Stanislavski's system, also known as Stanislavski's method, actors draw upon their own feelings and experiences to convey the "truth" of the character they portray. Actors puts themselves in the mindset of the character, finding things in common to give a more genuine portrayal of the character.
- Method acting is a range of techniques based on for training actors to achieve better characterizations of the characters they play, as formulated by Lee Strasberg. Strasberg's method is based upon the idea that to develop an emotional and cognitive understanding of their roles, actors should use their own experiences to identify personally with their characters. It is based on aspects of Stanislavski's system. Other acting techniques are also based on Stanislavski's ideas, such as those of Stella Adler and Sanford Meisner, but these are not considered "method acting".
- Meisner technique requires the actor to focus totally on the other actor as though they are real and they only exist in that moment. This is a method that makes the actors in the scene seem more authentic to the audience. It is based on the principle that acting finds its expression in people's response to other people and circumstances. Is it based on Stanislavski's system.

== Cross-gender acting ==
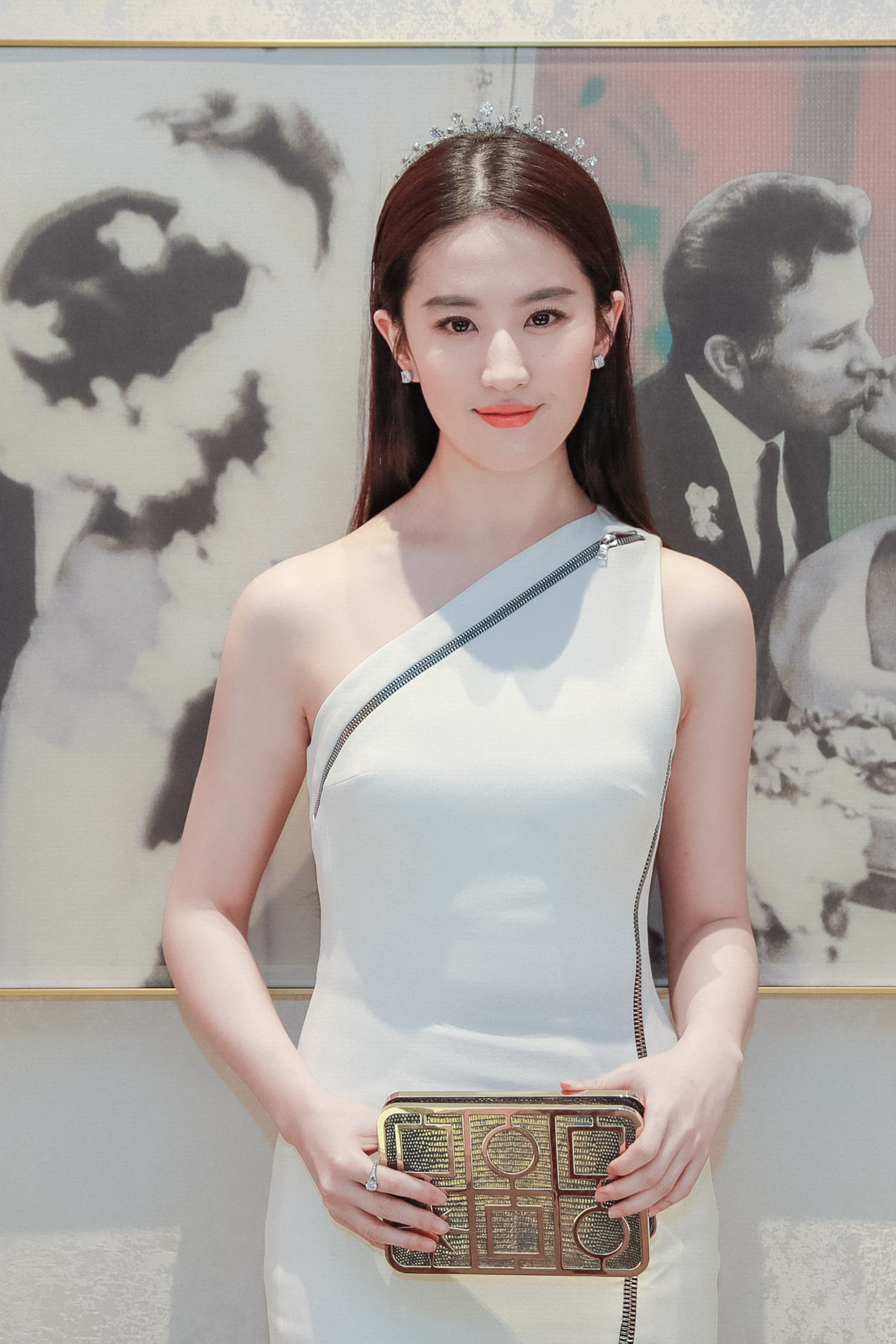
In Mulan (2020), Liu Yifei portrays the iconic character of Mulan, who initially disguises herself as a man to take her father's place in the army.

Having an actor dress as the opposite sex for comic effect is a long-standing tradition in comic theatre and film. Most of Shakespeare's comedies include instances of overt cross-dressing, such as Francis Flute in A Midsummer Night's Dream. The movie A Funny Thing Happened on the Way to the Forum stars Jack Gilford dressing as a young bride. Tony Curtis and Jack Lemmon famously posed as women to escape gangsters in the Billy Wilder film Some Like It Hot. Cross-dressing for comic effect was a frequently used device in most of the Carry On films. Dustin Hoffman and Robin Williams have each appeared in a hit comedy film (Tootsie and Mrs. Doubtfire, respectively) in which they played most scenes dressed as a woman.

Occasionally, the issue can be complicated, for example, by a woman playing a woman acting as a man—who then pretends to be a woman, such as Julie Andrews in Victor/Victoria, or Gwyneth Paltrow in Shakespeare in Love. In It's Pat: The Movie, film-watchers never learn the gender of the androgynous main characters Pat and Chris (played by Julia Sweeney and Dave Foley). Similarly, in The Marriage of Figaro, there is a scene in which Cherubino (a male character portrayed by a woman) dresses up and acts like a woman; the other characters in the scene are aware of a single level of gender role obfuscation, while the audience is aware of two levels.

Women playing male roles are uncommon in film, with notable exceptions. In 1982, Stina Ekblad played the mysterious Ismael Retzinsky in Fanny and Alexander, and Linda Hunt received the Academy Award for Best Supporting Actress for playing Billy Kwan in The Year of Living Dangerously. In 2007, Cate Blanchett was nominated for the Academy Award for Best Supporting Actress for playing Jude Quinn, a fictionalized representation of Bob Dylan in the 1960s, in I'm Not There.

A few modern roles are played by a member of the opposite sex to emphasize the gender fluidity of the role. Edna Turnblad in Hairspray was played by Divine in the 1988 original film, Harvey Fierstein in the Broadway musical, and John Travolta in the 2007 movie musical. Eddie Redmayne was nominated for an Academy Award for playing Lili Elbe (a trans woman) in 2015's The Danish Girl.

As non-binary and transgender characters have become more commonplace in media, including film, it has become more common for cisgender actors to play those characters, such as Hilary Swank starring as Brandon Teena in Boys Don't Cry. Conversely, transgender actors may play cross-gender roles, especially before public transition, such as Elliot Page playing as Shawna Hawkins in the Tales of the City miniseries.

== Women in acting ==
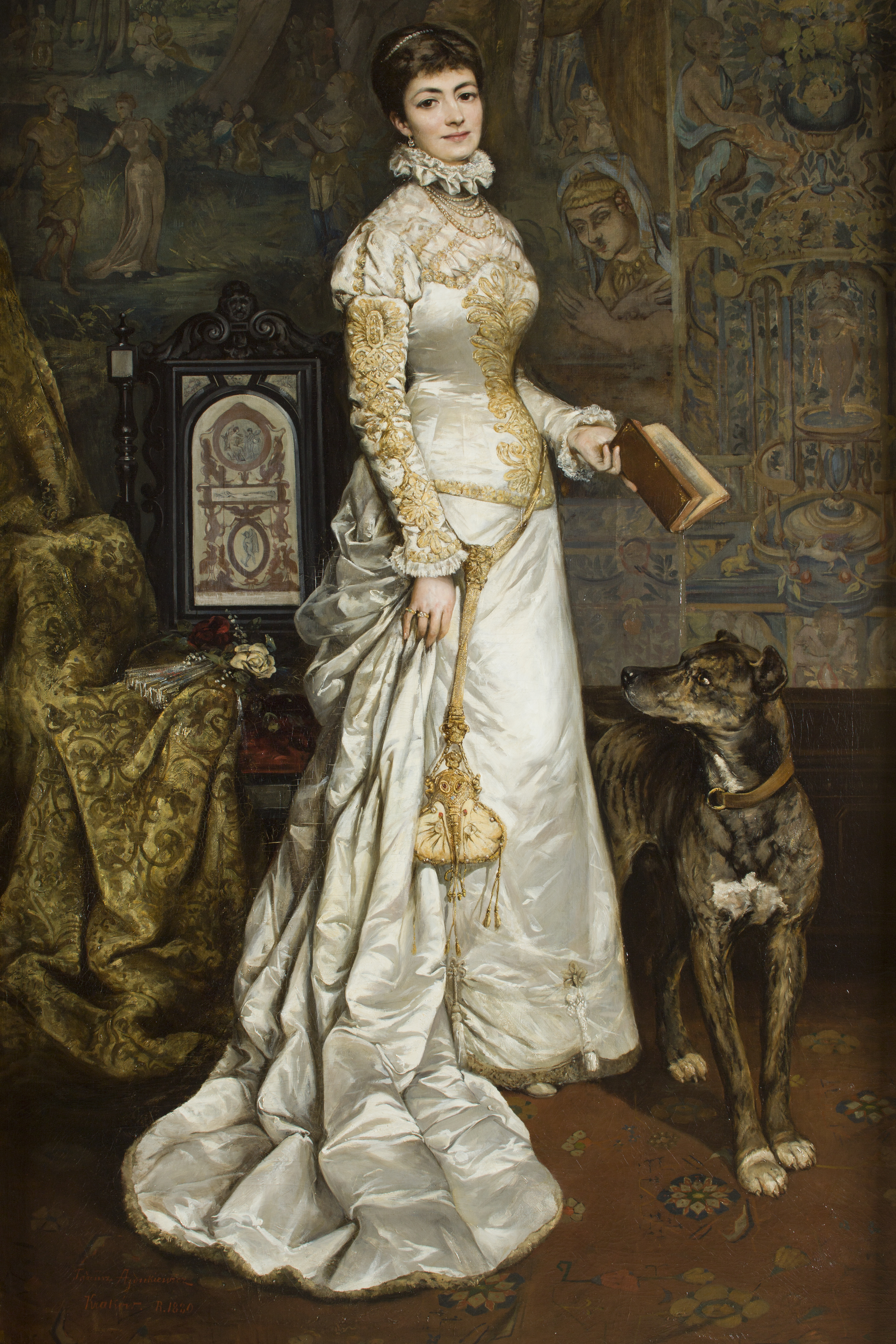
Helena Modrzejewska, a Polish-American actress, by Tadeusz Ajdukiewicz, 1880.

Formerly, in some societies, only men could become actors. Women appearing on stage in public have been viewed as controversial, provocative and not respectable, and male actors often played the female roles in plays. In Europe and elsewhere, there have been periods of women being barred from acting or placed in restricted roles.

In ancient Greece and ancient Rome and the medieval world, it was considered disgraceful for a woman to go on stage. Nevertheless, women did perform in Ancient Rome, and again entered the stage in the Commedia dell'arte in Italy in the 16th century; in 1562, Lucrezia Di Siena became the perhaps first professional actress since Ancient Rome. France and Spain also had female actors in the 16th century. In William Shakespeare's England, however, women's roles were generally played by men or boys.

=== Antiquity ===
In ancient Greece, women were barred from appearing on stage. There were only male actors in Ancient Greek theatre, and male actors played the female parts in plays. There have even been speculations as to whether women were allowed to watch plays as members of the audience as well.

In contrast to Ancient Greek theatre, Ancient Roman theatre did allow female performers. While the majority of them were seldom employed in speaking roles but rather for dancing, there was a minority of actresses in Rome employed in speaking roles, and also those who achieved wealth, fame and recognition for their art, such as Eucharis, Dionysia, Galeria Copiola and Fabia Arete, and they also formed their own acting guild, the Sociae Mimae, which was evidently quite wealthy. The profession of acting seemingly died out in late antiquity.

=== Middle ages ===
During the Middle Ages, a broad spectrum of genres of theatre were performed. These genres included mystery plays, morality plays, farces and masques.

The actors performing in the medieval theatre genres were normally not professional actors. Rather, they were amateurs who were temporarily engaged to perform a role in a production staged on a temporary basis during some sort of festivity.

The amateurs engaged to perform in religious plays were typically drawn from their sponsoring church congregations, and the common thing was to engage men to perform also the female parts. However, women were not explicitly banned, and there were cases in which women were appointed to play. In 1514, for example, women were engaged to perform all the female roles in the Bozen Passion Play in the city of Bolzano.

=== Renaissance Europe ===
Women in Europe first started to appear on stage professionally during the Renaissance. They first did so in Italy, Spain and France. In the mid-17th century, they started to appear on stage in The Holy German Empire and in The Netherlands. England was late to allow women to appear on stage, but they finally did so in the 1660s.

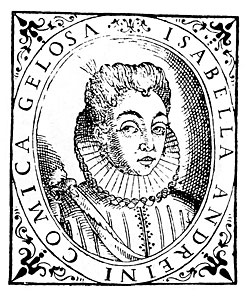
Isabella Andreini, 1588 print

The first professional company of actors since antiquity in which the names of the members are known by name are from Padova in 1545; the name of the actors of that company were all men, and since no name of any professional actress is known prior to Lucrezia, it has been assumed that there were no actresses before. During the entry of king Henri II and Catherine de Medici to Lyon in 1548, the tragicomedy La Calandria by Bernardo Dovizi was performed by both male and female actors from Italy, of which Brantome noted that it was "very well performed by the actors and actresses, who were very beautiful, spoke very well, and were extremely graceful". However, it is not known if the Italian actors that performed this play were professional actors, or if they were people temporary engaged to participate in the festivities by staging a play, which would not have been uncommon for women during this time period. A letter from Mantova in 1562 mention an unnamed actress from Rome performing with "Moorish dances". Lucrezia Di Siena, whose name is on an acting contract in Rome from 10 October 1564, has been referred to as the first Italian actress known by name, with Vincenza Armani and Barbara Flaminia as the first primadonnas and the first well-documented actresses in Italy (and Europe). From the 1560s onward, actresses became the norm in Italian theaters, and when Italian theater companies toured abroad, Italian actresses became the first women actors performing in many countries.

Women also started to appear on stage outside of Italy during the 16th century. During the Spanish Golden Age theatre (1590–1641), women performed on stage from the very beginning. Ana Muñoz toured and performed in the theater company of actor-manager Antonio de Villegas after their marriage in 1589, and took over the company herself after his death; Jerónima de Burgos performed with her husband in the theater company of Alonso de Cisneros and Jerónimo Velázquez, touring Portugal as well as Spain during the 1590s; and Micaela de Luján (c. 1570–1614) became the role model for Carmila Lucinda by Lope de Vega; all of them worked as actresses during the 1590s.

In France, women appear to have performed in the travelling theater companies early on during the 16th century, though the exact time the first actress appeared is hard to determine. Prior to the establishment of the first permanent theatre in Paris, the actors of the travelling theatre companies are not well documented regardless of their sex. While professional French actresses were reportedly active in France in the second half of the 16th century, they are seldom mentioned by name and then normally only very briefly. Nine contemporary actresses beside Marie Vernier are briefly mentioned: Jeanne Crevé, Judith Le Messier, Elisabeth Diye, Mlle Dufresne, Isabelle Paquette Le Gendre, Francoise Petit, Marguerite Dugoy, Renée Berenger and Rachel Trepeau, but only Marie Vernier and Rachel Trepeau are documented to any large degree. Marie Vernier, known also as Mlle La Porte, was the leading lady and co-director of Valleran-Lecomte's theatre company, which performed in Hôtel de Bourgogne in Paris and toured the country and the Spanish Netherlands from a least 1604 onward.

=== 17th to 19th centuries ===
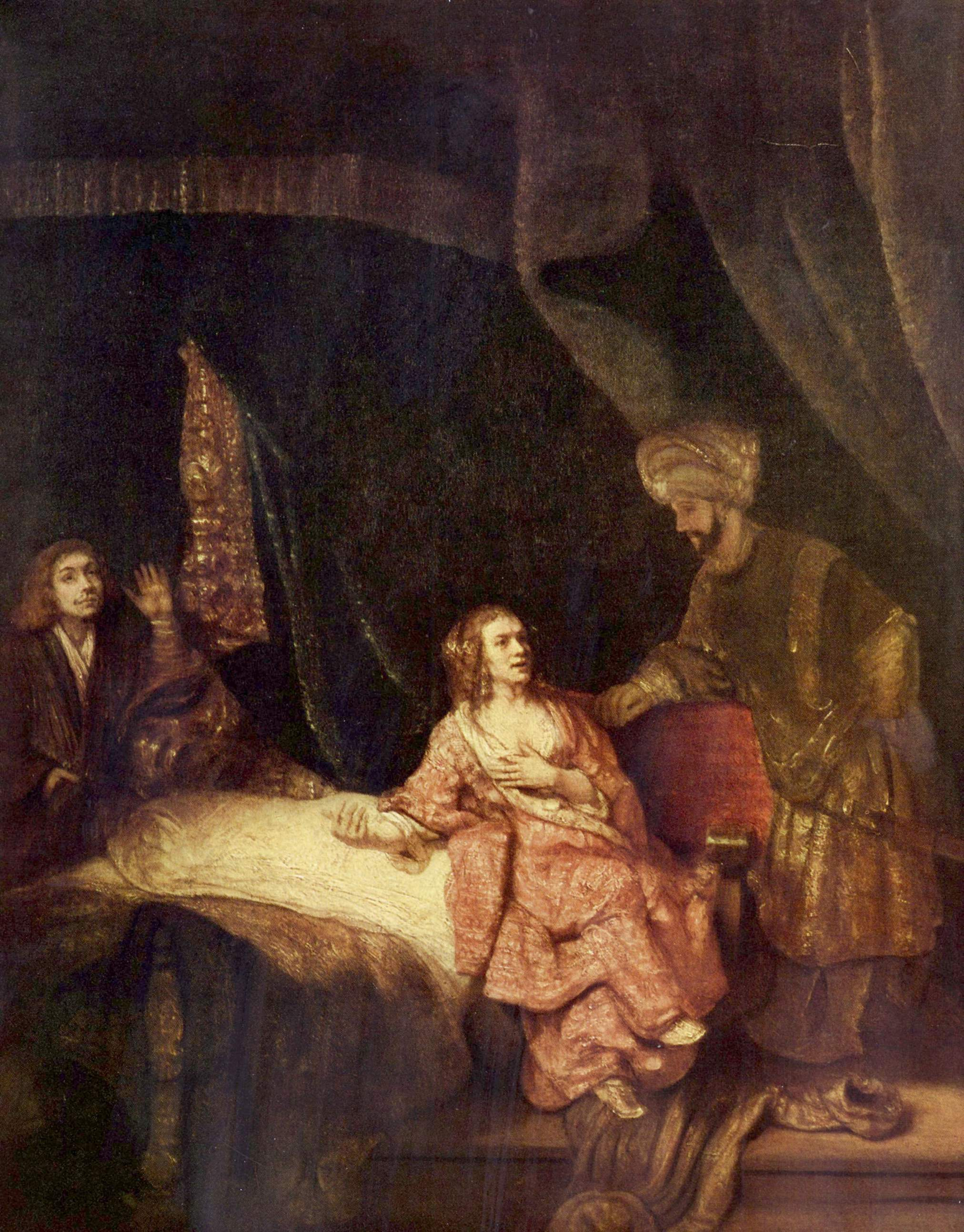
Ariana Nozeman portrayed in a role. Joseph Accused by Potiphar's Wife (1655)

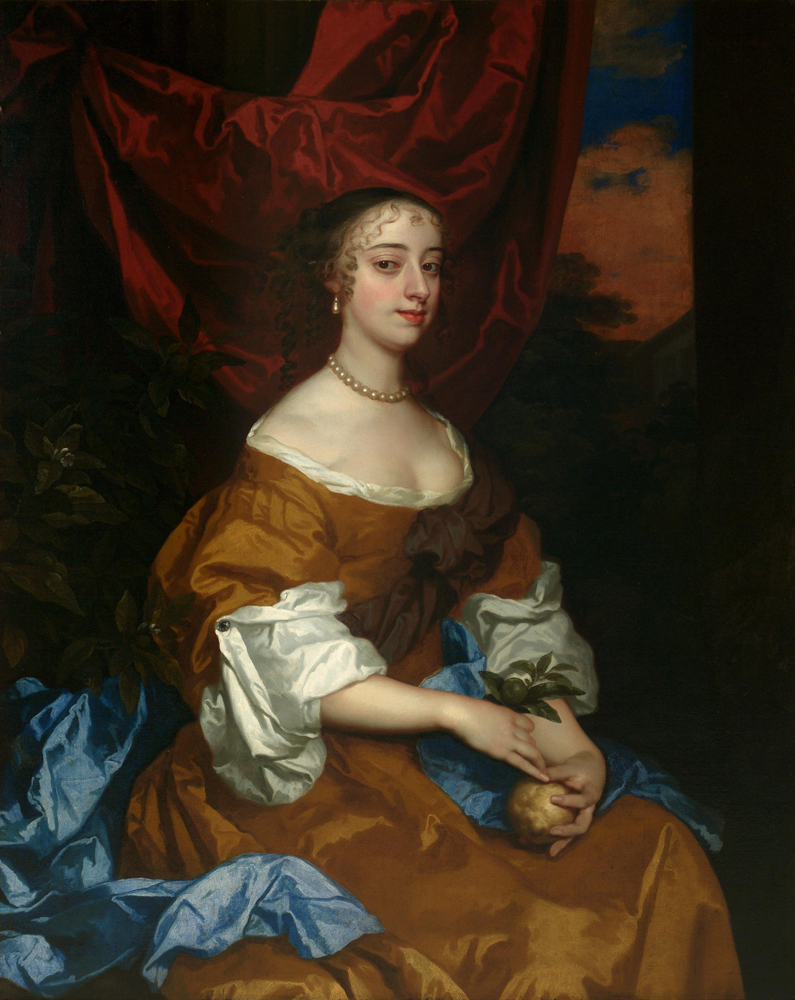
Portrait of Margaret Hughes by Peter Lely, 1672

Following the Renaissance, the art of theatre spread across Europe also outside of the countries that previously enjoyed Italian or English style theatre. Theatre started to develop independently also in the rest of Europe, that experienced its first native professional actors and theatres in the 17th and 18th centuries.

This also created new attitudes to the issue of women performing on stage, since every country now formed their own opinions in the issue. The outcome was that women actors started to appear one by one in each country; sometimes after a law reform explicitly allowing them to act, and sometimes simply as a matter of slow informal development, when individual theater managers started to employ women. This appeared in different times in different countries. In some countries that had native actors, like the Holy Roman Empire and The Netherlands, this happened earlier. In some countries, like the Nordic countries, Poland and Russia, this happened later, simply because they did not have a native theater with native actors until relatively late in time.

In Germany and the Netherlands, women started to perform in the native travelling theatre companies in the mid-17th century. The first actresses were normally the wives and daughters of the theater managers, and their presence were accepted since they performed in a family company under supervision of a father or husband. Initially they were not allowed to perform in the permanent city theatres, but soon they made their debut there as well. On April 19, 1655, Ariana Nozeman made her debut at the stage of the Schouwberg of Van Kampen in Amsterdam in a play by Jan Jacobsz. Schipper which bore her name 'Onvergelijkelijke Ariana' ('Incomparable Ariana'), and thus became the first woman to play a leading role in a public play in The Dutch Republic.

The debut of women on stage in Germany appear to have taken place the same year. In September 1655, "female players" are noted to have been performed in Frankfurt for the first time. Under Magister Velthen and his father-in-law Carl Andreas Paulsen, the first actresses were employed in Germany. Velthens wife Catharina Elisabeth Velten acted with her mother and sister on stage in first in her father's and then in her husband's theater, the Hochdeutsche Hofcomödianten, and after her husband's death, she managed his theater and continued his policy of employing women.

England was late in introducing women on the stage compared to the rest of Western Europe. In the first half of the 17th century, women were still not allowed on the English stage. The English audience were first introduced to female actors by visiting foreign theatre companies. The perhaps first actress to perform in England was the Italian actress Angelica Martinelli, a member of a visiting Italian Commedia dell'arte company, who performed in England as early as 1578. The rare occurrence of foreign actresses during visits by foreign theatre companies, however, did not result in an English reform, and there were no professional native English actresses. In November 1629, a French theatre company was allowed to make a guest appearance at the Blackfriars Theatre in London, during which the actresses were "hissed, booed and pippin - pelted from the stage". When an eighteen-year Puritan prohibition of drama was lifted after the English Restoration of 1660, women began to appear on stage in England. Margaret Hughes is often credited as the first professional actress on the English stage. The prohibition against female actors ended during the reign of Charles II in part because he enjoyed watching actresses on stage. Specifically, Charles II issued letters patent to Thomas Killigrew and William Davenant, granting them the monopoly right to form two London theatre companies to perform "serious" drama, and the letters patent were reissued in 1662 with revisions allowing actresses to perform for the first time.

In rest of Europe, the debut of women actors came later. However, this was normally not because of a ban on female actors, as had been the case in Western Europe, but rather because Northern and Eastern Europe came late in establishing a national theater with professional native actors of their own. In Northern and Eastern Europe, foreign actresses appeared onstage decades before there were any native actors of any gender.

One example of this was Sweden. There was never any ban for women performing on the stage in Sweden, and women appear to have performed on stage as soon as the first foreign theatre companies, that included women members, visited Sweden. In 1653, a Dutch theatre company performed at the royal court of queen Christina; this theatre company included female members - Ariana Nozeman, Elisabeth de Baer and Susanna van Lee who are believed to have been the likely first actresses to perform in Sweden. However, Sweden relied on foreign theatre companies for a long time and it took decades after the 1650s until native Swedish actresses appeared. The first national theatre to employ professional native actors, the Kungliga svenska skådeplatsen was inaugurated at the Stora Bollhuset in 1737; it is noted to have employed three female actors from the start, one of whom being Beata Sabina Straas.

In Russia, the first theatre was founded in Moscow by the Tsar in 1672. This theatre did employ women actors, but all actors were foreigners (mainly German). The following decades, many foreign theater companies, mainly from Italy, France and Germany, were active in Moscow and Saint Petersburg. However, it was not until the 30th August 1756 Decree of the Imperial Theatres that native Russians were, for the first time, recruited to be educated in acting. The pioneer group of Russian actors consisted of fourteen men - Grigorij Jemeljanov, Pavel Ivanov, Kozma Lukjanov, Fjodor Maksimov, Evstafij Grigorjev, Luka Ivanov, Prokofij Prikaznyj, Fjodor Volkov, Grigorij Volkov, Ivan Dmitrevskij, Aleksej Popov, Gavrila Volkov, Jakov Sjumskij and Michail Tjulkov - and five women; Avdotya Mikhailova, Elizaveta Zorina, Maria Ananyin, Olga Ananyin and Agrafena Musina-Pushkina.

In Poland-Lithuania, Italian, French and German theatre and opera companies had performed at the royal court since the 16th century. The first public theatre, the National Theatre, Warsaw, was founded in 1765, and the first pioneering group of native Polish actors were employed and trained to perform there. Women were members of this pioneer acting groupe from the start, and Antonina Prusinowska and Wiktoria Leszczyńska is credited as the first two native female actors in Poland.

In some cases, this did not occur until the 19th century. After the independence of Greece in 1830, a great interest in theatre flourished in Greece. Initially amateur theatre, a professional theatre developed, and the first modern permanent theatre in Athens, the Boukoura Theatre, was founded in 1840. In professional theatre, women's roles were initially played by men or by foreign (Italian) actresses. The first Greek actress being Maria Angeliki Tzivitza, who performed in the Boukoura Theatre on 24 November 1840, and retired after two performances. In September 1842, N. Skoufos, Dimitrios Levidis, Alexandros Rizos Rangavis and Grigoris Kampouroglou founded the Athenian Theatre Committee or Society of Theatre with the intent to educate professional Greek actors in Athens. Male actors were swiftly hired, but it was difficult to find women because the profession was not considered respectable for women. Ekaterina Panayotou signed her contract for the Society of Theatre in Athens on 8 November 1842 and became the first female actor hired, followed by Athena Filipaki, Marigo Defteridi and Marigo Domestini. She has the distinction of being the first professional Greek actress with formal training.

=== East Asian theatre ===
In Japan, onnagata, or men taking on female roles, were used in kabuki theatre when women were banned from performing on stage in the 17th century during the Edo period; this ban ended in the 19th century. In 1858, Ichikawa Kumehachi made her debut and became the first actress in kabuki theatre since the ban on female actors in 1629, and thus acting as a profession was reintroduced for women in Japan. In 1882, she was accepted as a pupil of Ichikawa Danjūrō IX and took the stage name Ichikawa Masunojō. Western modern theater was introduced in Japan in the late 19th century during the Meiji era, with Kawakami Otojirō as a prominent theater pioneer, and his wife, the geisha and dancer Sada Yacco, who had already performed in underground Kabui theater in the 1880s, made her debut as a stage actress of modern Western theater in 1890s.

In China, there were several forms of drama, theater and opera. There were never a full ban on women performing onstage, rather the regulations differed depending on which form of drama was performed on stage. In some forms of Chinese drama such as Beijing opera, men traditionally performed all the roles, including female roles, while in Shaoxing opera women often play all roles, including male ones.

In India, women as well as male actors performed in the Sanskrit theatre during antiquity. The modern theater was introduced in India as an amateur theatre in the 1850s and became commercial in the 1870s, when the first indigenous Indian actress in modern theater made her debut on stage. Binodini Dasi began her acting career in 1875 at the age of twelve in the Bengali theatre, a domain traditionally dominated by men, and achieved widespread fame for her portrayals of mythological and historical female characters.

=== Middle East ===
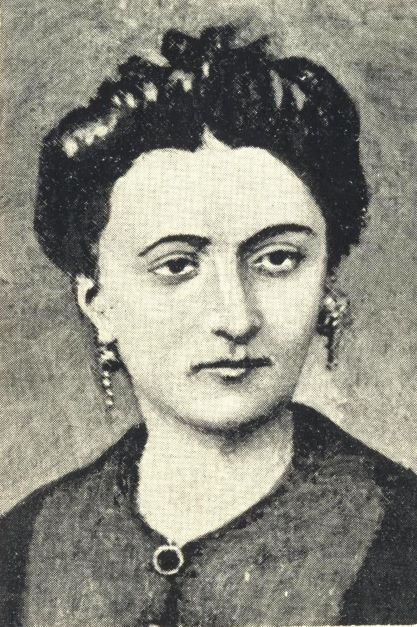
Arousyak Papazian, an Armenian actress, believed to be the first professional female actor in the Middle East

In the 1850s, the modern theatre was founded in the Ottoman Empire during the Tanzimat era by an Armenian theatre company, and Arousyak Papazian was reportedly the first female actor to perform onstage, making her debut in 1857 as a member in the Hekimian theatre company, where she was engaged in 1857–1859. Before becoming an actress, she worked as a teacher. From 1861, she was engaged at the Arevelian Tatron (Oriental Theater) and she also toured with the company, such as to İzmir in 1867. As Muslims did not consider acting a suitable profession for a woman, who were expected to live in harem sex segregation, the first actors in the Ottoman Empire were Christian Armenians; and as the stigma of the profession was especially severe for women, the actresses received a higher salary than their male colleagues, and they could also continue their careers undisturbed after the Armenian theatre monopoly was abolished in the Ottoman Empire in 1879. After this point, male Armenian actors found competition from Muslim Turkish male actors, while no Muslim Turkish female actor ever performed on stage before Afife Jale in the 1920s.

In 1870, modern theater was founded in Egypt with the theater company of the theater pioneer Yaqub Sanu. Modern theater art, largely imported from the Western world, demanded female actors to play female roles. While Yaqub Sanu was able to acquire indigenous male actors, he experienced great difficulty to engage indigenous Egyptian female actors. In this time period, women in Egypt were normally segregated in harems and veiled in public and it was not accepted for a Muslim woman to engage in acting. Yaqub Sanu was allowed to employ women to act on stage since it was seen as necessary, but he was forced to engage non-Muslim women. He was eventually able to employ two poor Jewish girls: Milia Dayan and her sister. The Dayan sisters are known as the first actresses in the Arab world alongside Miriam Samat, Warda Milan, Mathilde Nagga and the sisters Ibriz Estati and Almaz Estati, all of whom were non-Muslim women. The first Muslim actress did not appear in Egypt and the Arab world until Mounira El Mahdeya in 1915.

=== Modern roles ===
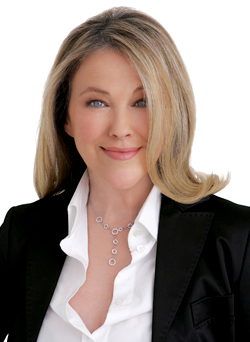
Canadian-American actress Catherine O'Hara

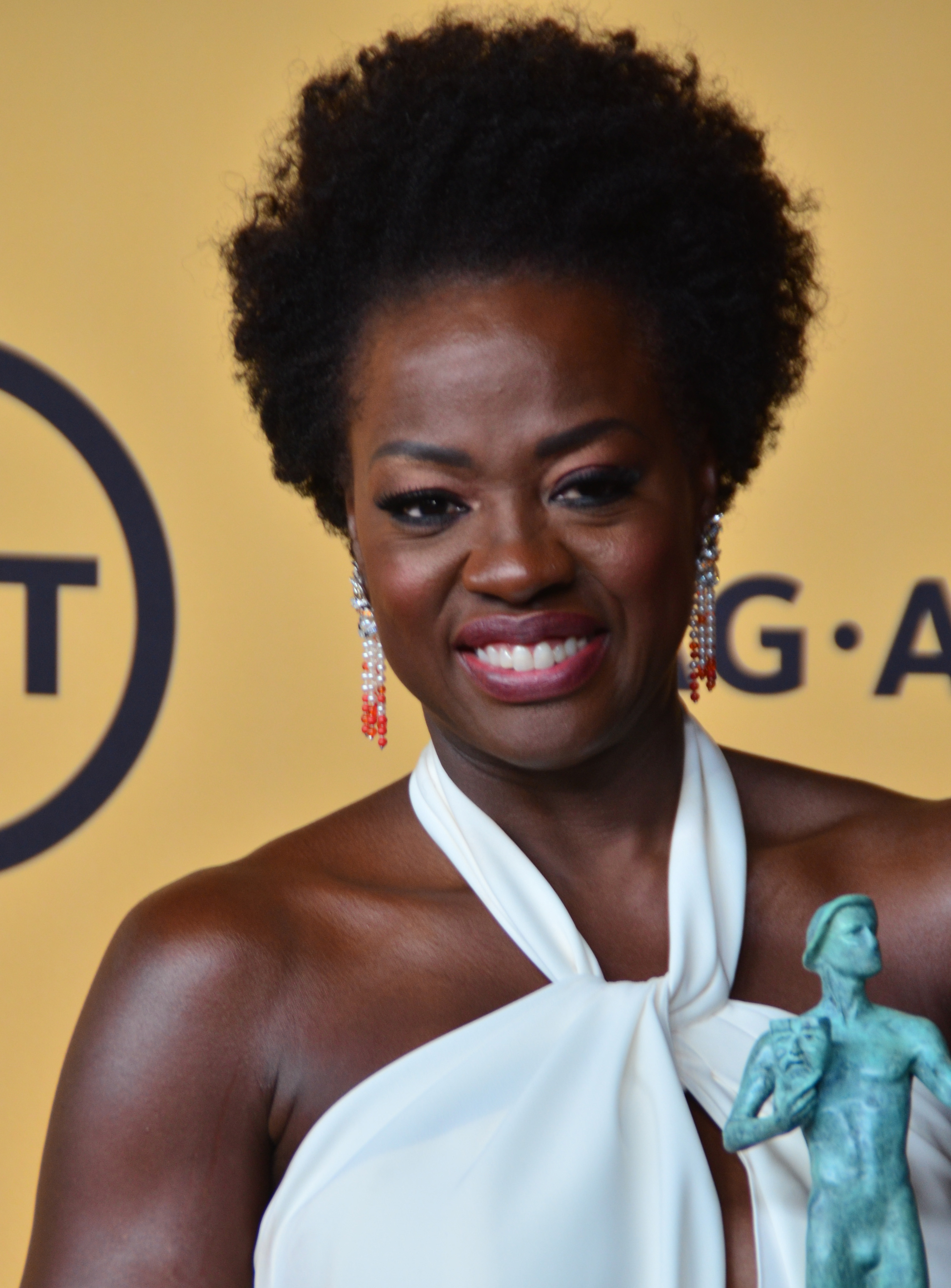
Actress and film producer Viola Davis at the 2015 Screen Actors Guild Awards. An EGOT winner, Davis was named by Time as one of the most influential people in the world in both 2012 and 2017.

In modern times, women occasionally play the roles of boys or young men. For example, the stage role of Peter Pan is traditionally played by a woman, as are most principal boys in British pantomime. Opera has several "breeches roles" traditionally sung by women, usually mezzo-sopranos. Examples are Hansel in Hänsel und Gretel, Cherubino in The Marriage of Figaro and Octavian in Der Rosenkavalier.

In the 2000s, women playing men in live theatre is particularly common in presentations of older plays, such as Shakespearean works with large numbers of male characters in roles where gender is inconsequential.

== Compensation ==
The profession of acting has always had a large breadth of potential incomes. Some actors in 1600s England earned a comfortable income, with Shakespeare himself likely earning 6 shillings per week during his early acting career, which was a typical wage for a skilled tradesman.

In 2024, the median hourly wage for actors in the United States was $23.33 per hour. Many lack benefits such as health insurance, with only 12.7% of SAG-AFTRA members earning enough income to qualify for its health plan. Full-time actors in Britain earned a median of £22,500 in the same year, slightly less than the minimum wage.

Despite lower median incomes in the profession, some actors earn exceedingly large incomes. Film actors such as Aamir Khan (Note: ₹257 crore ($39.4 million at 2017 exchange rates).) and Sandra Bullock have earned tens of millions of dollars for single film productions.

In the United States, union child actors are paid a daily rate of at least $1,204, although due to their legal status as minors, most or all of the income chiefly goes to the parents or legal guardians. In California, the Coogan Act requires 15% of a child's earnings be placed into a blocked trust account, to be opened when they become a legal adult. Illinois, New York, New Mexico, and Louisiana all have similar requirements.

=== Gender pay gap ===
In 2015, Forbes reported that "...just 21 of the 100 top-grossing films of 2014 featured a female lead or co-lead, while only 28.1 percent of characters in 100 top-grossing films were female...". "In the U.S., there is an "industry-wide [gap] in salaries of all scales. On average, white women earn 78 cents to every dollar a white man makes, while Hispanic women earn 56 cents to a white male's dollar, black women 64 cents and Native American women just 59 cents to that." Forbes' analysis of US acting salaries in 2013 determined that the "...men on Forbes' list of top-paid actors for that year made 2 1/2 times as much money as the top-paid actresses. That means that Hollywood's best-compensated actresses made just 40 cents for every dollar that the best-compensated men made."

== Types ==
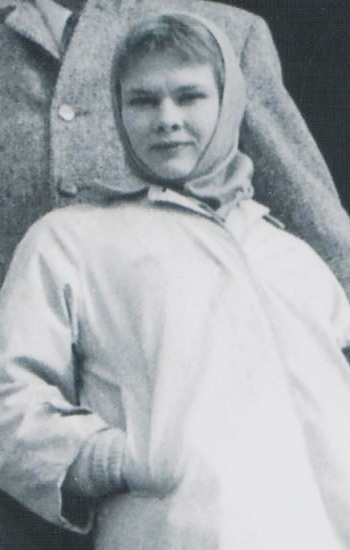
Judi Dench is known for her work both in theatre and in film.

Actors working in theatre, film, television, and radio have to learn specific skills. Techniques that work well in one type of acting may not work well in another type of acting.

=== In theatre ===
To act on stage, actors need to learn the stage directions that appear in the script, such as "Stage Left" and "Stage Right". These directions are based on the actor's point of view as they stand on the stage facing the audience. Actors also have to learn the meaning of the stage directions "Upstage" (away from the audience) and "Downstage" (towards the audience). Theatre actors need to learn blocking, which is "...where and how an actor moves on the stage during a play". Most scripts specify some blocking. The Director also gives instructions on blocking, such as crossing the stage or picking up and using a prop.

Some theater actors need to learn stage combat, which is simulated fighting on stage. Actors may have to simulate hand-to-hand fighting or sword-fighting. Actors are coached by fight directors, who help them learn the choreographed sequence of fight actions.

=== In film ===
==== Silent films ====
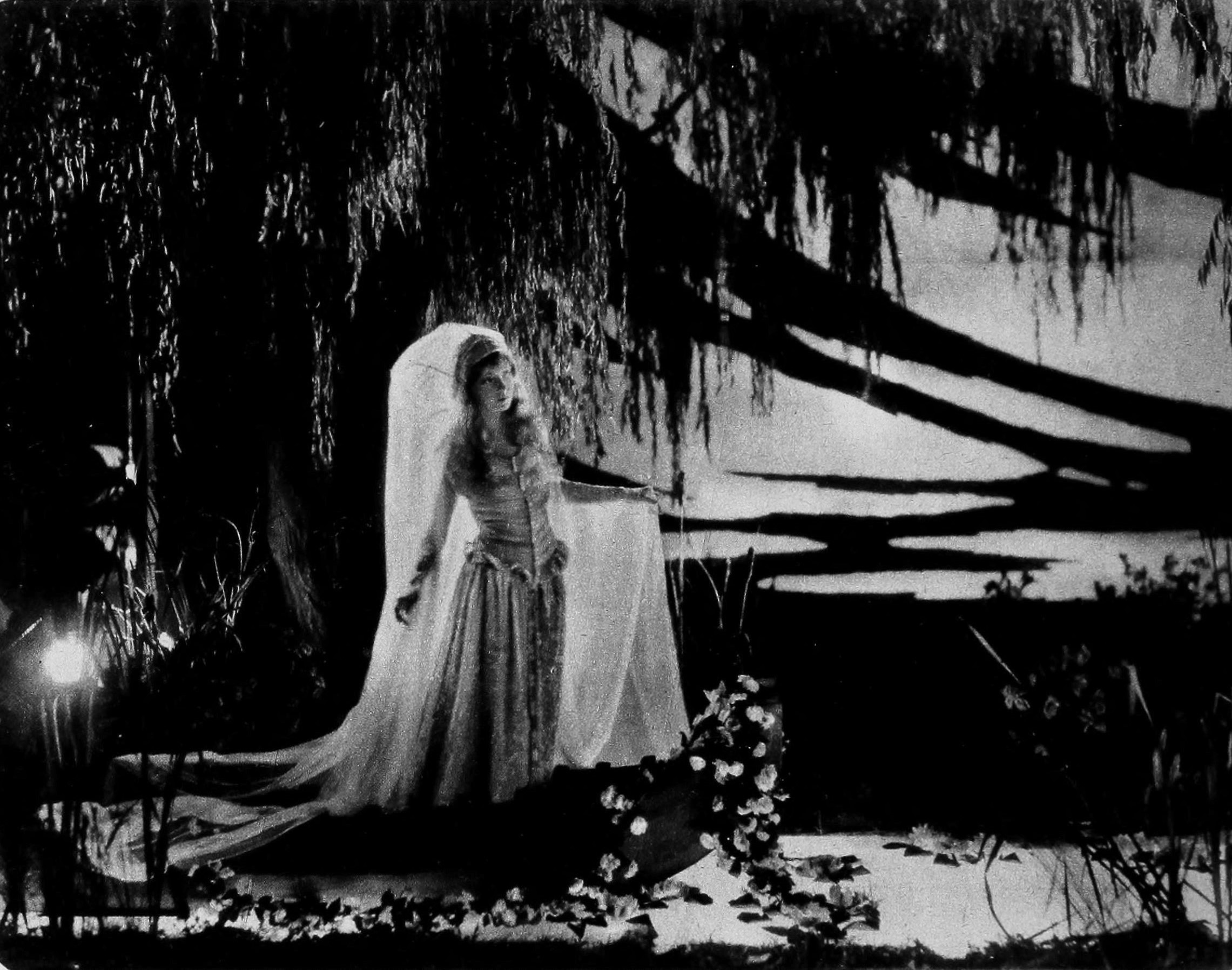
Lillian Gish posed as Elaine of Astolat in Way Down East

From 1894 to the late 1920s, movies were silent films. Silent film actors emphasized body language and facial expression, so that the audience could better understand what an actor was feeling and portraying on screen. Much silent film acting is apt to strike modern-day audiences as simplistic or campy. The melodramatic acting style was in some cases a habit actors transferred from their former stage experience. Vaudeville theatre was an especially popular origin for many American silent film actors. The pervading presence of stage actors in film was the cause of this outburst from director Marshall Neilan in 1917: "The sooner the stage people who have come into pictures get out, the better for the pictures". In other cases, directors such as John Griffith Wray required their actors to deliver larger-than-life expressions for emphasis. As early as 1914, American viewers had begun to make known their preference for greater naturalness on screen.

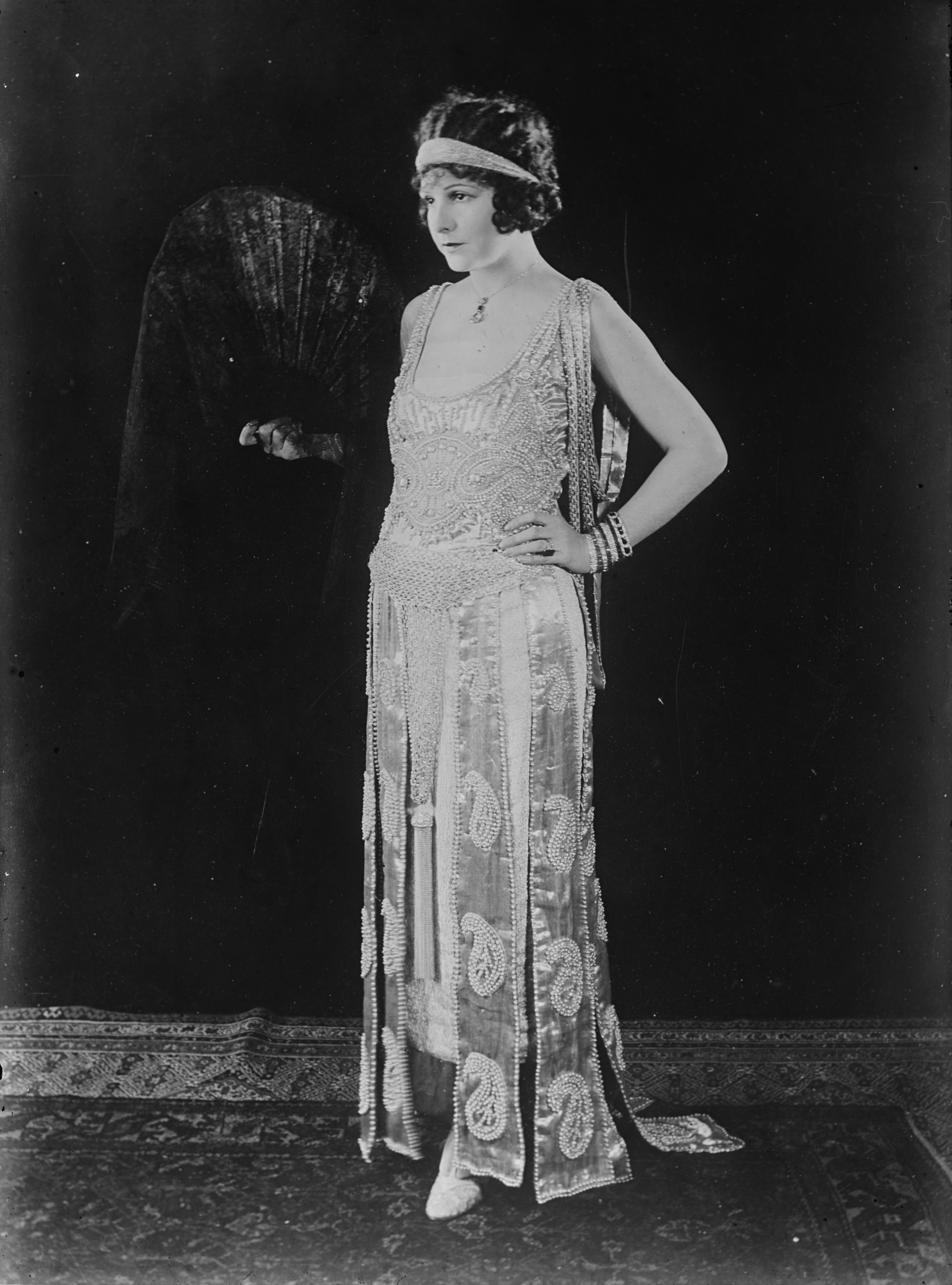
Norma Talmadge, an American silent film actress.

Pioneering film directors in Europe and the United States recognized the different limitations and freedoms of the mediums of stage and screen by the early 1910s. Silent films became less vaudevillian in the mid-1910s, as the differences between stage and screen became apparent. Due to the work of directors such as D W Griffith, cinematography became less stage-like, and the then-revolutionary close-up shot allowed subtle and naturalistic acting. In America, D.W. Griffith's company Biograph Studios, became known for its innovative direction and acting, conducted to suit the cinema rather than the stage. Griffith realized that theatrical acting did not look good on film and required his actors and actresses to go through weeks of film acting training.

Lillian Gish has been called film's "first true actress" for her work in the period, as she pioneered new film performing techniques, recognizing the crucial differences between stage and screen acting. Directors such as Albert Capellani and Maurice Tourneur began to insist on naturalism in their films. By the mid-1920s many American silent films had adopted a more naturalistic acting style, though not all actors and directors accepted naturalistic, low-key acting straight away; as late as 1927, films featuring expressionistic acting styles, such as Metropolis, were still being released.

According to Anton Kaes, a silent film scholar from the University of Wisconsin, American silent cinema began to see a shift in acting techniques between 1913 and 1921, influenced by techniques found in German silent film. This is mainly attributed to the influx of emigrants from the Weimar Republic, "including film directors, producers, cameramen, lighting and stage technicians, as well as actors and actresses".

==== The advent of sound in film ====
Film actors have to learn to get used to and be comfortable with a camera being in front of them. Film actors need to learn to find and stay on their "mark". This is a position on the floor marked with tape. This position is where the lights and camera focus are optimized. Film actors also need to learn how to prepare well and perform well on-screen tests. Screen tests are a filmed audition of part of the script.

Unlike theater actors, who develop characters for repeat performances, film actors lack continuity, forcing them to come to all scenes (sometimes shot in reverse of the order in which they ultimately appear) with a fully developed character already.

"Since film captures even the smallest gesture and magnifies it..., cinema demands a less flamboyant and stylized bodily performance from the actor than does the theater." "The performance of emotion is the most difficult aspect of film acting to master: ...the film actor must rely on subtle facial ticks, quivers, and tiny lifts of the eyebrow to create a believable character." Some theatre stars "...have made the theater-to-cinema transition quite successfully (Laurence Olivier, Glenn Close, and Julie Andrews, for instance), others have not..."

=== In television ===
Gene Kelly taping 'American Treasure - A Smithsonian Journey', 1985.

"On a television set, there are typically several cameras angled at the set. Actors who are new to on-screen acting can get confused about which camera to look into." TV actors need to learn to use lav mics (Lavaliere microphones). TV actors need to understand the concept of "frame". "The term frame refers to the area that the camera's lens is capturing." Within the acting industry, there are four types of television roles one could land on a show. Each type varies in prominence, frequency of appearance, and pay. The first is known as a series regular—the main actors on the show as part of the permanent cast. Actors in recurring roles are under contract to appear in multiple episodes of a series. A co-star role is a small speaking role that usually only appears in one episode. A guest star is a larger role than a co-star role, and the character is often the central focus of the episode or integral to the plot.

=== In radio ===
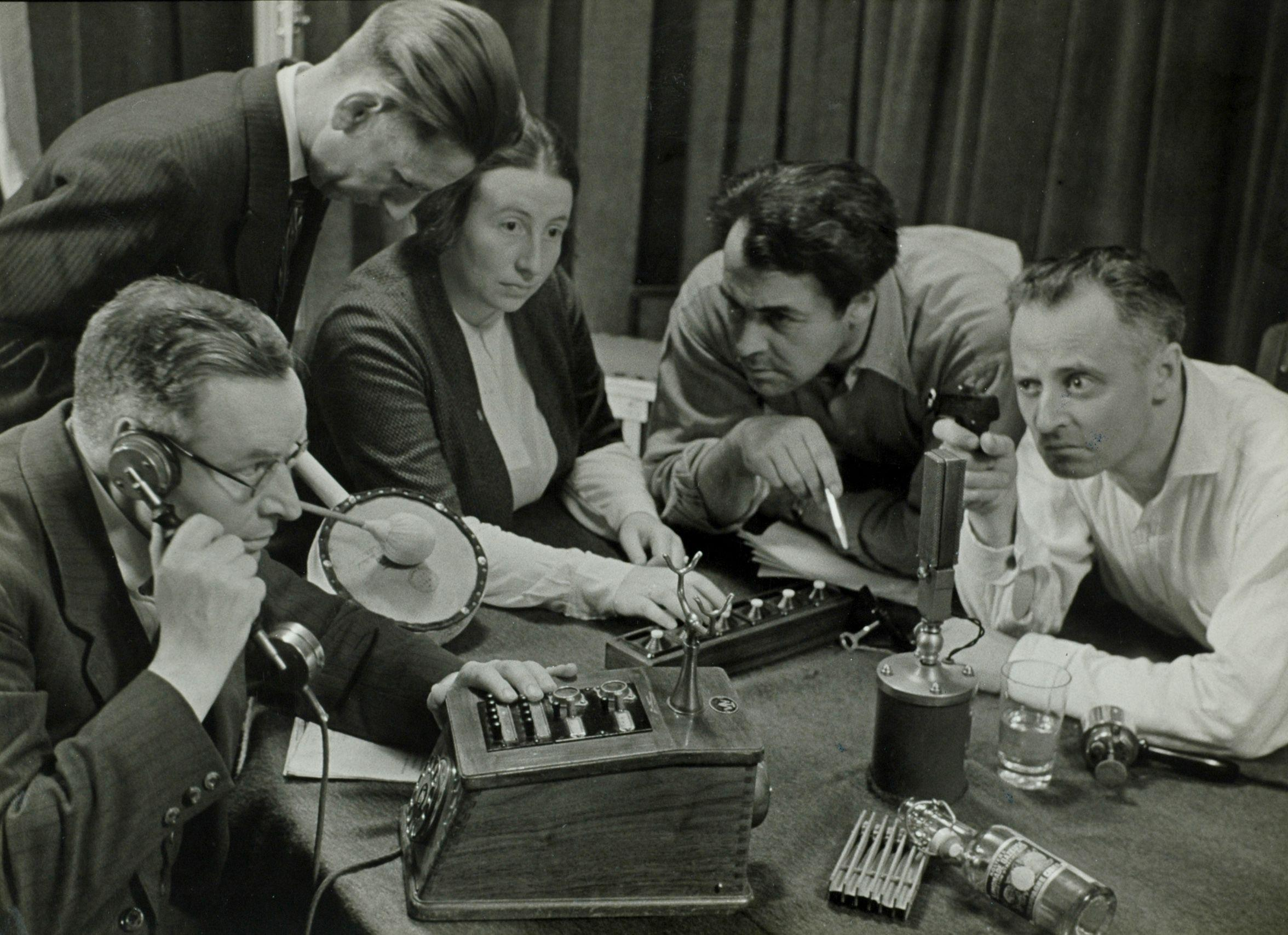
Recording a radio play in the Netherlands (1949; Spaarnestad Photo)

Radio drama is a dramatized, purely acoustic performance, broadcast on radio or published on audio media, such as tape or CD. With no visual component, radio drama depends on dialogue, music and sound effects to help the listener imagine the characters and story: "It is auditory in the physical dimension but equally powerful as a visual force in the psychological dimension."

Radio drama achieved widespread popularity within a decade of its initial development in the 1920s. By the 1940s, it was a leading international popular entertainment. With the advent of television in the 1950s, however, radio drama lost some of its popularity, and in some countries has never regained large audiences. However, recordings of OTR (old-time radio) survive today in the audio archives of collectors and museums, as well as several online sites such as Internet Archive.

As of 2011, radio drama has a minimal presence on terrestrial radio in the United States. Much of American radio drama is restricted to rebroadcasts or podcasts of programs from previous decades. However, other nations still have thriving traditions of radio drama. In the United Kingdom, for example, the BBC produces and broadcasts hundreds of new radio plays each year on Radio 3, Radio 4, and Radio 4 Extra. Podcasting has also offered the means of creating new radio dramas, in addition to the distribution of vintage programs.

The terms "audio drama" or "audio theatre" are sometimes used synonymously with "radio drama" with one possible distinction: audio drama or audio theatre may not necessarily be intended specifically for broadcast on radio. Audio drama, whether newly produced or OTR classics, can be found on CDs, cassette tapes, podcasts, webcasts, and conventional broadcast radio.

Thanks to advances in digital recording and Internet distribution, radio drama is experiencing a revival.

== See also ==
- Bit part
- Body double
- Cameo appearance
- Cast member
- Character actor
- Child actor
- Commedia dell'arte
- Dramatis personæ
- Droll
- Extra (acting)
- Farce
- GOTE
- Kabuki
- Leading actor
- Lists of actors
- Matinee idol
- Meisner technique
- Mime artist
- Movie star
- Music hall
- Pantomime
- Pornographic film actor
- Practical Aesthetics
- Presentational and representational acting
- Supporting actor
- Understudy
- Vaudeville
- Voice acting
