= Margaret Hughes =

British actress (1630–1720)

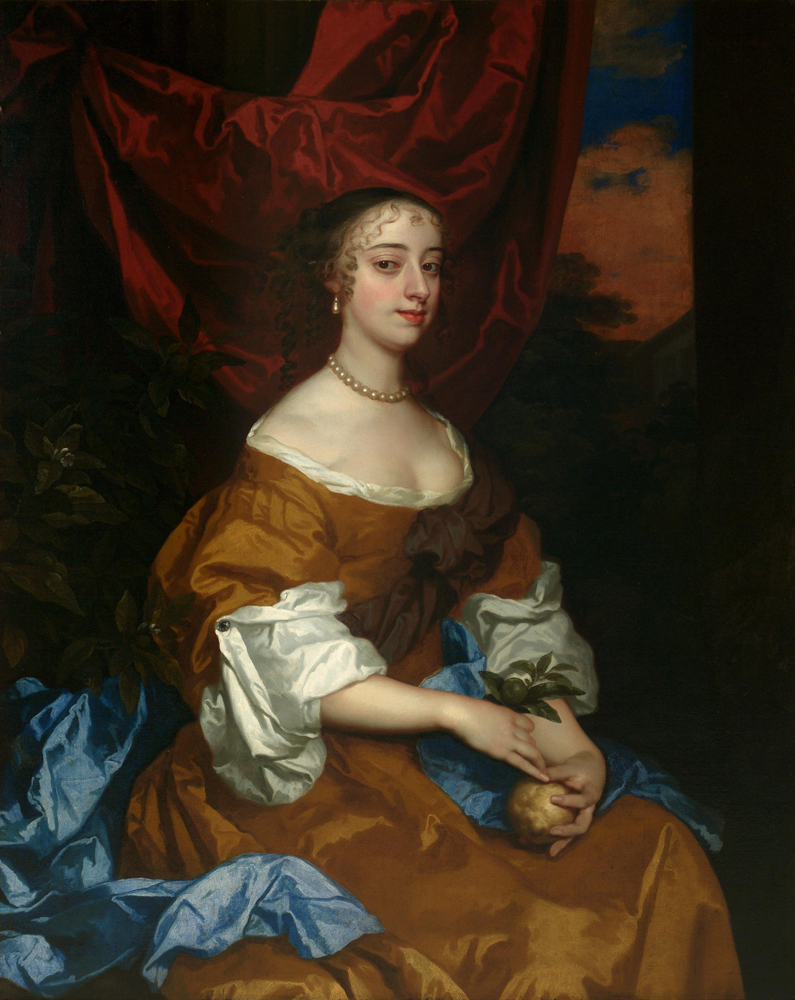
- Portrait by Sir Peter Lely, 1672
- Born: 29 May 1630
- Died: 1 October 1719 (aged 89); Eltham, Kent, England
- Occupation: Actress
- Partner: Prince Rupert of the Rhine
- Children: 2

Margaret Hughes (29 May 1630 – 1 October 1719), also Peg Hughes or Margaret Hewes, was an English actress who is often credited as the first professional actress on the English stage, as a result of her appearance on 8 December 1660. (Note: The nationality specification is essential. The Italian actress Lucrezia Di Siena is noted in 1562. Another Italian actress was reported as early as 1565–66; see Rennert, Spanish Stage, p. 140. The earliest kabuki performers in Japan in 1603 were women. Thomas Coryate, in Coryate's Crudities, noted actresses in Venice in 1611; see Halliday, Shakespeare Companion, p. 22. Ana Muñoz of Spain was noted in the 1580s, Marie Vernier of France in 1590, and Ariana Nozeman debuted on the Amsterdam Schouwburg (Amsterdam Theater) in 1655. For amateur precedents, see: Tempe Restored; The Shepherd's Paradise.) Hughes was the mistress of the Royalist English Civil War general Prince Rupert of the Rhine.

== Women in Restoration drama ==
Hughes became an actress during a period of great change in English drama, which had suffered greatly during the English Civil War and the Interregnum, being banned by the Puritan Long Parliament in 1642. This ban was finally lifted upon the Restoration of King Charles II. Charles was a keen theatre-goer, and promptly gave two royal patents to Sir Thomas Killigrew and Sir William Davenant. During the Renaissance women did not appear as actresses on the English stage; instead, male actors played female roles. There were also concerns over this practice encouraging "unnatural vice", i.e., homosexuality, which reinforced Charles in his decision in 1662 to issue a royal warrant declaring that all female roles should be played only by actresses. Killigrew and Davenant began casting women almost immediately following the Restoration and, once women began appearing professionally on the stage in the early 1660s, they won quick acceptance. Killigrew staged an all-female-cast production of his own play The Parson's Wedding in 1664 and again in 1672.

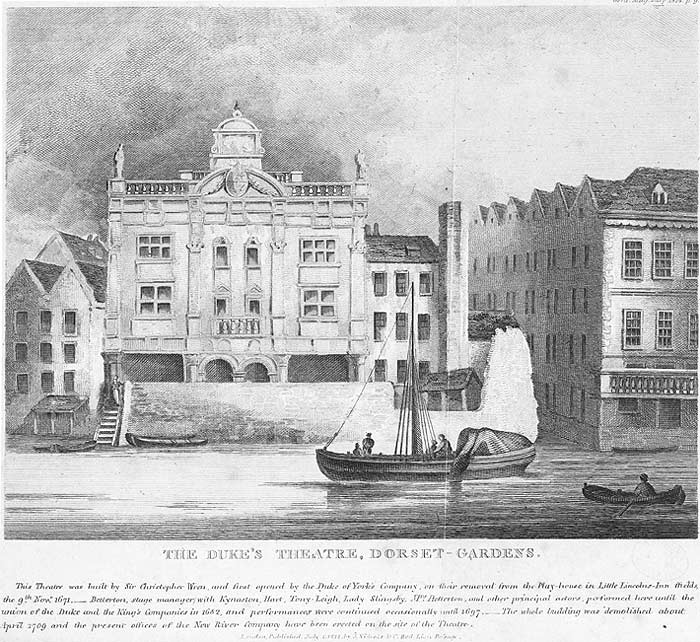
The Dorset Garden Theatre of the Duke's Company of actors, where Hughes spent a busy season in 1676.

At the age of 30, Hughes made theatre history by becoming the first woman known to perform on an English stage, when on 8 December 1660, she played the role of Desdemona in William Shakespeare's play Othello, in a production by Thomas Killigrew's new King's Company at their Vere Street theatre. Some historians identify Anne Marshall as the first actress to step onto the English stage. However, there has been much analysis of the early recollections of John Downes, whose memories of the 1660s form a key part of Hughes' claim in this regard.

== Personal life ==
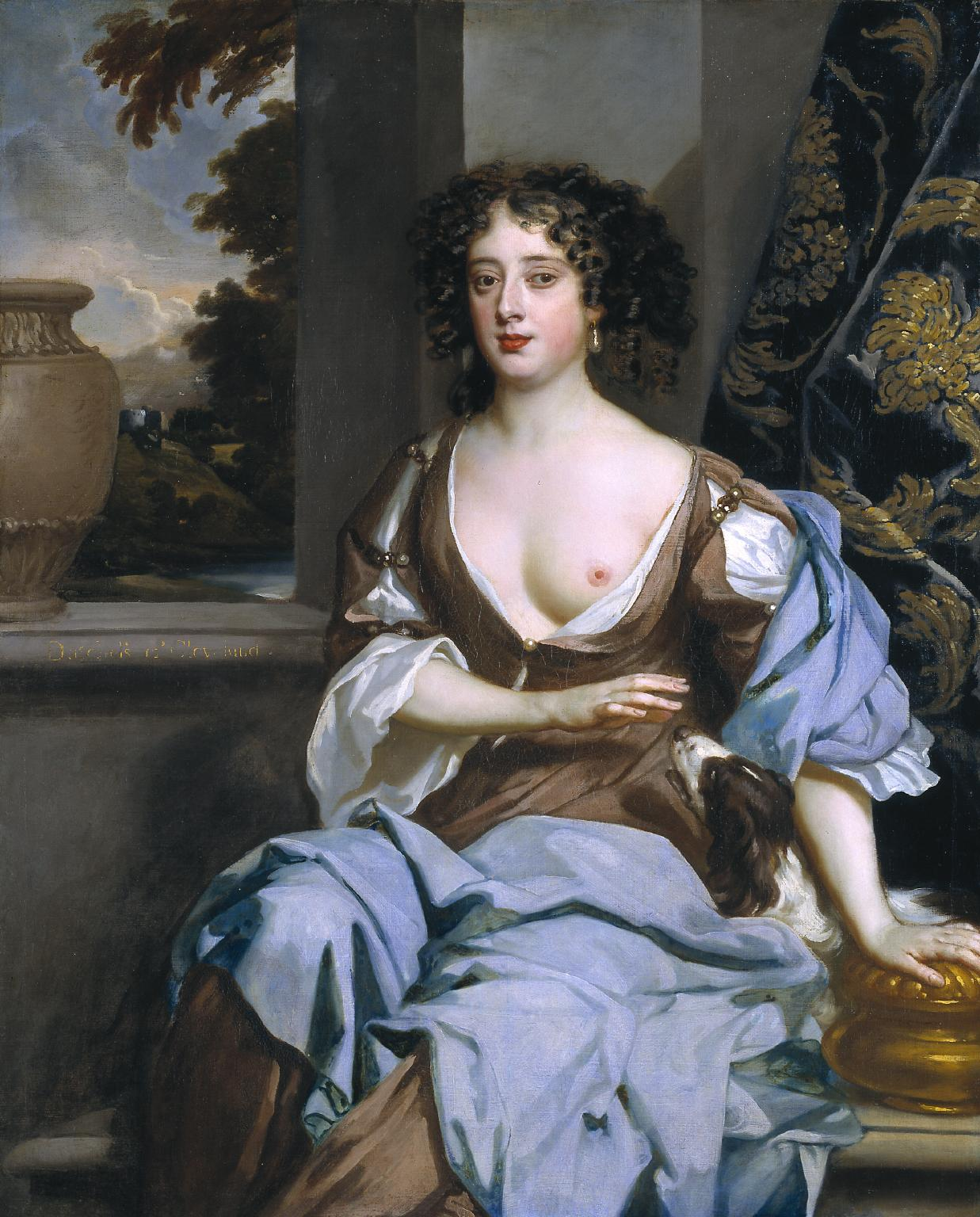
Portrait of Hughes, with breast exposed, c. 1670 by Peter Lely

Hughes was famous for her charms as an actress; diarist Samuel Pepys considered her "a mighty pretty woman", and she was said to be "a great beauty, with dark ringletted hair, a fine figure, and particularly good legs". Pepys suggested that she was a lover of Sir Charles Sedley, a noted dramatist and "famous fop", in the 1660s; she was reportedly also involved with Charles II himself, if only briefly. It is believed that Hughes had an illegitimate son named Arthur, but there is no conclusive evidence of this.

Margaret Hughes' lover and partner, Prince Rupert, Duke of Cumberland, by Peter Lely

Most famously, however, Hughes became associated with Prince Rupert (sometimes known as "Rupert of the Rhine"), as his lover. Rupert fell in love with her in the late 1660s, although Hughes appears to have held out reciprocating his attentions with the aim of negotiating a suitable settlement. Prince Rupert was one of the most senior members of the royal family at court, and Hughes rapidly received advancement through his patronage; she became a member of the King's Company by 1669, giving her status and immunity from arrest for debt, and was painted four times by Sir Peter Lely, the foremost court artist of the day.

Despite being encouraged to do so, Rupert did not formally marry Hughes, but acknowledged their daughter, Ruperta (later Howe), born in 1673. Hughes lived an expensive lifestyle during the 1670s, enjoying gambling and jewels; Rupert gave her at least £20,000 worth of jewellery during their relationship, including several items from the Palatinate royal collection. The two appear to have been close – Prince Rupert's older brother, Charles Louis, Elector Palatine, once sounded out Rupert as to his willingness to return to the Rhineland and marry appropriately, but his suggestion was rejected. Hughes continued to act even after Ruperta's birth, returning to the stage in 1676 with the prestigious Duke's Company at the Dorset Garden Theatre, near the Strand in London. The next year Rupert established Hughes in a "grand building" on the Fulham Road in Hammersmith worth £25,000 that he bought from Sir Nicholas Crispe.

Prince Rupert died in 1682, leaving most of his estate, worth some £12,000, equally to Hughes and Ruperta. Hughes had an "uncomfortable widowhood" without Rupert's support, allegedly not helped by her continued gambling. Presents from Rupert such as Elizabeth of Bohemia's earrings were sold to the Duchess of Marlborough, whilst a pearl necklace given by Rupert's father to Hughes was sold to fellow actress Nell Gwyn. Hughes sold the house in Hammersmith to two London merchants, Timothy Lannoy and George Treadwell; ultimately it was purchased by the Margrave of Brandenburg-Anspach and became known as Brandenburg (or Brandenburgh) House. Hughes' daughter, Ruperta, ultimately married Emanuel Howe, future MP and English general.

Hughes died in 1719.

== Professional career ==
Hughes certainly played Desdemona in the performance of Othello seen by Samuel Pepys on 6 February 1669. She also played:

- St Catherine in John Dryden's Tyrannick Love
- Panura in John Fletcher's The Island Princess.

She probably played:

- Theodocia in Dryden's An Evening's Love
- Angellina in James Shirley's The Sisters.

Hughes left the stage for Prince Rupert in 1669 or 1670. In 1676 she emerged from retirement for one busy year with the Duke's Company. For that company, she played:

- Octavia in Edward Ravenscroft's The Wrangling Lovers
- Gerana in Elkanah Settle's Pastor Fido
- Mirva in Elkanah Settle's Ibrahim
- Mrs Moneylove in Thomas Rawlins's Tom Essence
- Charmion in Sir Charles Sedley's Antony and Cleopatra
- Valeria in Aphra Behn's The Rover
- Leonora in Thomas Porter's The French Conjuror
- Cordelia in Thomas d'Urfey's A Fond Husband

== In popular culture ==
A one-act play about Margaret Hughes, entitled The First Actress, was performed in 1911, at the Kingsway Theatre in London, by a group of suffragette actresses who called themselves the Pioneer Players. Ellen Terry played Nell Gwyn in this production.

Jeffrey Hatcher wrote a play about Edward Kynaston entitled Compleat Female Stage Beauty (2000), and later adapted his play for the 2004 film Stage Beauty, directed by Richard Eyre and starring Claire Danes as Hughes. Hughes's first stage appearance is also discussed in the 2015 play Nell Gwynn, but she remains an offstage character. Hughes is the main character of Diana Norman's historical novel The Vizard Mask (1994). She is depicted as a stuttering American Puritan, Penitence Hurd, who becomes a successful Restoration actress.

== See also ==
- Angelica Martinelli; the first non-native actress to perform in England and got famous
- Women in acting

== Bibliography ==
- Gilder, Rosamond. Enter the Actress: The First Women in the Theatre. Boston, Houghton Mifflin, 1931.
- Halliday, F. E., A Shakespeare Companion 1564–1964. Baltimore, Penguin, 1964.
- Highfill, Philip H., Kalman A. Burnim and Edward A. Langhans. Volume 8 of A Biographical Dictionary of Actors, Actresses, Musicians, Dancers, Managers and Other Stage Personnel in London, 1660–1800. Southern Illinois University Press, 1982.
- Howe, Elizabeth. The First English Actresses: Women and Drama, 1660–1700. Cambridge, Cambridge University Press, 1992.
- Rennert, Hugo Albert. The Spanish Stage in the Time of Lope de Vega. Hispanic Society of America, 1909.
- Spencer, Charles. Prince Rupert: The Last Cavalier. London: Phoenix, 2007. ISBN 978-0-7538-2401-6.
- Thomson, Peter, et al., eds. The Cambridge History of British Drama. 3 Volumes, Cambridge, Cambridge University Press, 2004.
- Wilson, John Harold. All the King's Ladies: Actress of the Restoration. Chicago, University of Chicago Press, 1958
- Macqueen-Pope, W. Ladies First; the Story of Woman's Conquest of the British Stage. London: Allen, 1952
