= Tavoularis =

Tavoularis (Greek: Ταβουλάρη or Ταβουλάρης) is a Greek surname. Notable people with the surname include:

- Dean Tavoularis (1932–2026), American motion picture production designer of Greek descent
- Kyriakos Tavoularis (1898–1929), Greek army officer
- Sophia Tavoularis (1843–1916), Greek stage actor
- Stavros Tavoularis, Canadian physicist
- Katerina Tavoularis (born 1970), Greek American City Councilwoman, City of Orange, CA and conservative political activist

== See also ==
- William Tavoulareas (1919–1996), Greek-American petroleum businessman
