= Sophia Tavoularis =

Greek stage actress (1843–1916)

Sophia Tavoularis (1843–1916), was a Greek stage actress. She belonged to the pioneers of the modern Greek theater of the 19th century.

Tavoularis is noted to be active as a member of the travelling theater company of her spouse and colleague Dionysios Tavoularis, who was the leader of a Greek theater company touring Istanbul and the Greek cities such as Athens, Syros and Smyrna. The modern Greek theater was founded after the Greek independence of 1830, and the capital of Athens in itself did not have a theater until the Skontzopoulos Theatre of Athanasios Skontzopoulos in 1836 and no permanent theatre until the Boukoura Theatre. The Tavoularis couple is regarded as one of the pioneers of the 19th-century Greek theater. They enjoyed great success and belonged to the more known Greek actors of their generation, popular in the Greek cities they toured.

Tavoularis was one of the first Greek actresses, as female actors did not enter the Greek stage until 1840, and even in the audience, the Ottoman ban of women from sitting with men at the theater, rather than restricting them from sitting with their family in a box, was not lifted until 1874.

She was a popular actress and her spouse acted as her agent. In 1867, she joined the theater company "Sophokles" of Sofoklis Karydis and in 1872 the "Menander", which was at the time the largest Greek stage. In 1901, she joined the theater New Stage of Constantine Christomanos, who also toured abroad such as in Great Britain and the United States.
