= Elisabeth de Baer =

Dutch stage actress

Elisabeth de Baer also known as Elisabeth Kalbergen (died after June 1662) was a Dutch stage actress. She is known as one of the first pioneer female actors of the Amsterdam stage.

== Life and career ==
The background of Elisabeth de Baer is unconfirmed. She is believed to have come from an acting family, and the actor Heere de Boer is suggested to have been her brother. She is known to have had a sister, Margriet de Baer, who in 1642 married Triael Parker, who was an actor at the Amsterdamse Schouwburg theatre. Elisabeth de Baer married 23 January 1649 in Amsterdam to the actor Dirck Kalbergen (d. 1655), and in 1660 to the musician Aernoldus van Linste. She had one son who died in infancy.

Elisabeth de Baer was engaged in the theatre company of Jan Baptist van Fornenberghs (1624–1697), which toured Northern Germany, Denmark and Sweden between 1649 and 1654. She was employed in this theatre company alongside her female colleagues Ariana Nozeman and Susanna van Lee, who were also married to male actors, and together, they would have been the first female actors to perform in Sweden (as well as Denmark).

In The Netherlands in the mid 17th century, female actors were active in travelling theatre companies, but had not been allowed to perform in permanent city theatres. In May 1655, Ariana Nozeman became the first actress to be employed at the Amsterdamse Schouwburg theatre. In July 1655, Elisabeth de Baer was employed at the Amsterdamse Schouwburg. She was mainly employed in supporting female roles in serious plays and farse. She was also assigned roles in ballet productions. In the summer of 1660, she participated in a guest performance in Zeeland. In June 1662, she resigned alongside her colleagues Jacob Kemp and Johannes van Velzen. Nothing is known of her later life and career.
