= Ekaterina Panayotou =

Greek actress

Ekaterina Panayotou (fl. 1842 – fl. 1846), was a Greek stage actor. She belonged to the pioneers of the modern Greek theater of the 19th century, and was one of the first professional actresses in Greece.

She was born in Epiros. She moved to Athens, where she worked as a silk worker.

After the independence of Greece, a great interest in theatre flourished in Greece. Initially amateur theatre, a professional theatre developed, and the first modern permanent theatre in Athens, the Boukoura Theatre, was founded in 1840. In professional theatre, women's roles were initially played by men or by foreign (Italian) actresses. The first Greek actress being Maria Angeliki Tzivitza, who performed in the Boukoura Theatre on 24 November 1840, and retired after two performances.

In 1840, Ekaterina Panayotou debuted in Aristodemos by Vincenzo Monti, in an amateur theatre performance staged by Costache Aristia.

In September 1842, N. Skoufos, Dimitrios Levidis, Alexandros Rizos Rangavis and Grigoris Kampouroglou founded the Athenian Theatre Committee or Society of Theatre with the intent to educate professional Greek actors in Athens. Male actors were swiftly hired, but it was difficult to find women because the profession was not considered respectable for women. Ekaterina Panayotou signed her contract for the Society of Theatre in Athens on 8 November 1842 and became the first female actor hired, followed by Athena Filipaki, Marigo Defteridi and Marigo Domestini. She has the distinction of being the first professional Greek actress with formal training.

The company made their inauguration performance in the spring of 1843 with the tragedy Filippos II by Vittorio Alfieri with Ekaterina Panayotou as Isabella. According to the memoirs of Alexandros Rizos Rangavis, the whole of Athens rushed to the theatre to see the sensation of a Greek woman performing on stage. In the following years, she and Athena Filipaki shared the main female roles in Athens and enjoyed great popularity.

In February 1846, the theatre company was dissolved. Ekaterina Panayotou married and retired, and did not belong to the actors when the theatre opened again in 1856.
