= Susanna van Lee =

Dutch stage actress and ballet dancer

Susanna van Lee or Susanna Eeckhout (ca. 1630 – buried 13 January 1700) was a Dutch stage actress and ballet dancer. She is known as one of the first pioneer female actors of the Amsterdam stage.

== Life and career ==
The background of Susanna van Lee is unknown. She married the musician Conrad Rochus Eeckhout (ca. 1630–1701), who was from an acting family. The couple had two or three sons and two daughters.

Susanna van Lee was engaged in the theatre company of Jan Baptist van Fornenberghs (1624-1697), which toured northern Germany, Denmark and Sweden between 1649 and 1654. She was employed in this theatre company alongside her female colleagues Ariana Nozeman and Elisabeth de Baer, who were also married to male actors, and during the performance at the court of Queen Christina in 1653, they would have been the first female actors to perform in Sweden. They would additionally have been the first actresses to perform in Denmark during their stay their, as Denmark did not have a native theatre with actresses either at this time period.

In The Netherlands in the mid-17th century, female actors were active in travelling theatre companies, but had not been allowed to perform in permanent city theatres. In 1655, she, again with her colleagues Ariana Nozeman and Elizabeth de Baer, became the first women to be hired at the theatre of Amsterdam. In May 1655, Ariana Nozeman became the first actress to be employed at the Amsterdamse Schouwburg theatre. In July, Elisabeth de Baer was also employed, and Susanna van Lee is known to have been employed at least by September of that year. Her husband was also employed as actor and first violinist.

She was engaged at the theatre from 1655 until 1685. She was evidently a valuable member of the staff, which was reflected in her rising pay from 2,50 gulden to 4,50 gulden. In 1662, she was involved in a conflict with the theatre when she and her husband left to perform in the company of Van Fornenbergh i the Hague, which was a break of their contract. They were called to return: when van Fornenbergh fined her for breaking her contract with him, her colleagues in Amsterdam collected to fine money for her to enable her to return.

Susanna van Lee shared the main female roles with her colleague Ariana Nozeman, and mainly played the female heroine and ingenue. Among her roles were Constance in Constance by Tengnagel, the infanta in Cid by Corneille, and the title role in Hester by Johannes Serwouters. She also played male roles. She also participated in ballet, such as the "Juffren Balet".

Similar to her colleagues, she earned an additional income on the side of her acting career. In her case, she embroidered theatre costumes and rented out her own stage costumes; together with her spouse, she also managed a musical tavern.

At least two of her children became known stage artists. Her daughter Adriana Eeckhout (1650-1722) became a successful actress, and her son, Anthony Eeckhout (1662-1702), was employed at the Amsterdam theatre as a dancer and musician.

In 1700, she died in Amsterdam.
