= Athena Filipaki =

Greek stage actress

Athena Filipaki (fl. 1842 – fl. 1846), was a Greek stage actress. She belonged to the pioneers of the modern Greek theater of the 19th century and was one of the first professional actresses in Greece.

After the independence of Greece, a great interest in theatre flourished in Greece. Initially amateur theatre, a professional theatre developed, and the first modern permanent theatre in Athens, the Boukoura Theatre, was founded in 1840. In professional theatre, women's roles were initially played by men or by foreign (Italian) actresses. The first Greek actress was Maria Angeliki Tzivitza, who performed in the Boukoura Theatre on 24 November 1840, and retired after two performances.

In September 1842, N. Skoufos, Dimitrios Levidis, Alexandros Rizos Rangavis and Grigoris Kampouroglou founded the Athenian Theatre Committee or Society of Theatre with the intent to educate professional Greek actors in Athens. Male actors were swiftly hired, but there was difficulty in finding women because the profession was not considered respectable for women. Ekaterina Panayotou signed her contract for the Society of Theatre in Athens on 8 November 1842 and became the first female actor hired, followed by Athena Filipaki, Marigo Defteridi and Marigo Domestini. Athena Filipaki signed her contract in December 1842 and was thus the second woman.

The company made their inauguration performance in the spring of 1843 with the tragedy Filippos II by Vittorio Alfieri with Ekaterina Panayotou as Isabella. In the following years, Ekaterina Panayotou and Athena Filipaki shared the main female roles in Athens and enjoyed great popularity. Both of them had poems dedicated to them by the audience, and incidents about their professional rivalry were described by contemporaries.

In February 1846, the theatre company was dissolved. She married and retired.
