= Eucharis (actress) =

Ancient Roman child actress

Licinia Eucharis (fl. 1st century BC) was an adolescent Ancient Roman stage actress, who died at the age of 14. According to the epitaph on her tomb, which was written by her father, she was a star of the Theatre of ancient Rome. She is one of the few ancient actresses known to have achieved fame and respect in her profession during the Roman Republic.

Eucharis would most likely have primarily performed as a dancer, as few other roles were open to women. Her epitaph states that she had recently danced at "the games of the nobles", and that she had performed on the Greek stage before the People.

Eucharis was originally a slave, then a freedwoman, of the Roman woman Licinia. In contrast to Greece, where only male actors were allowed, the Romans allowed female performers. However, many prestigious theatres still barred women actors, and the majority of actresses performed on smaller stages as mimae, pantomime dancer-actresses, which was not regarded as a respectable profession, and therefore often performed by slaves or freedwomen.

Eucharis was among the relatively few actresses in ancient Rome who performed in prestigious theatres and earned an income from acting. She gained recognition for her performances, which were praised for their skill and artistry. An inscription commemorating her described her as having been “taught as if by the Muses’ hands.” She reportedly took pride in her profession and in the respect she earned.

Eucharis belonged to the handful of actresses known from the Roman Republic, including Antiodemis from Cyprus (2nd century BC), Arbuscula, Bacchis, Dionysia, Emphasis, Fabia Arete, Galeria Copiola, Sammula and Lucceia, Tertia, and Volumnia Cytheris.

== Sources ==
- Mary R. Lefkowitz, Maureen B. Fant: Women's Life in Greece and Rome: A Source Book in Translation., Johns Hopkins University Press, 2005
- Matthew Dillon, Lynda Garland, Ancient Rome: A Sourcebook
- Edith Hall, Rosie Wyles, New Directions in Ancient Pantomime
- Pat Easterling, Edith Hall, Greek and Roman Actors: Aspects of an Ancient Profession
- War, Women and Children in Ancient Rome (Routledge Revivals)
