= Skontzopoulos Theatre =

Skontzopoulos Theatre was a theatre in Athens in Greece, active in 1835–1837. It was the first modern theatre in Athens established after the Greek War of Independence, and the first to function in the city after antiquity.

It was founded on Kotzia Square, were a theater company under Athanasios Skontzopoulos had performed with an all-male cast from 1835. In 1836, the temporary structure was changed to a permanent one. It was the first modern theatre in Athens. It was replaced by the Meli theatre in 1837, which made a sensation and introduced the first female actresses on the Greek stage, but was also temporary. Athens was not given a permanent theatre until the foundation of the Boukoura Theatre (1840–1897).
