= Boukoura Theatre =

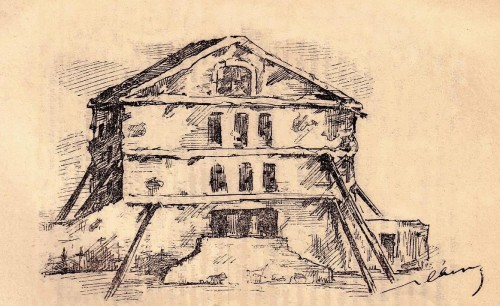
Boukoura theater

Boukoura Theatre was a theatre in Athens in Greece, founded in 1840 and closed in 1897. It was the only permanent theatre in Athens from its foundation until 1888.

== History ==
It was preceded by the temporary Skontzopoulos Theatre (1835–1837) and the Meli Theatre (1837). At the time, there was a great interest in theatre in Greece. A theatre was considered customary for any European capital, and the Apollon Theater, Syros had been founded in the provinces.

The Italian Iosif Camillieri was given permission to build a permanent theatre on Menandrou Street in 1838, a project which was finished by the Italian Basilio Sansoni, who was given theatre monopoly in 1839.

It had a horseshoe-shaped salon with 113 seats and a royal box. It was described as a theatre building that had all components customary for the theatres in Western Europe but in a more simple form.

It was inaugurated with Lucia de Lammermoor by Gaetano Donizetti on 6 January 1840.

The theatre played a major part in modern Greek theatre history and became the stage of the first pioneering professional Greek actors of modern Greece. In 1840, the first company of Greek actors was organized by Costache Aristia. The first professional Greek actress performed here in 1840. The season of 1840 was however to be a temporary one. In September 1842, N. Skoufos, Dimitrios Levidis, Alexandros Rizos Rangavis and Grigoris Kampouroglou founded the Athenian Theatre Committee with the intent to educate professional Greek actors in Athens. This was the second theatre company of the theatre and included the pioneers of the modern Greek theatre of Athens: the four actresses Athena Filippaki, Aikaterina Panagiotou, Marigo Defteridi, Marigo G. (Geo) Domestin, and the six male actors Leonidas Kapellis, Th. G. Orfanidis, K. Sakellaropoulos, G. Economidis, Sotirios Kourtesis and A. Patsopoulos. The theatre was closed in 1846 and remained closed until 1856.

Between 1844 and 1898, the building was owned and the theatre managed by Ioannis Boukouras, and became known by his name. In 1856, the theatre was reopened, and between 1856 and 1858, the theatre company of Grigoris Kampouroglou performed in it. It closed again in 1858, and was reopened for the third time in 1862.
