= Kyriakos Tavoularis =

Greek army officer

Kyriakos Tavoularis (Greek: Κυριάκος Ταβουλάρης; fl. 1898–1929) was a Greek army officer.

== Life ==
Kyriakos Tavoularis was born on 18 January 1880 at Karya, near Oitylo in Laconia. He joined the Hellenic Army as a volunteer on 1 January 1898. In April 1906 he went to then Ottoman-ruled Macedonia to participate in the Macedonian Struggle. He remained in Macedonia until July 1909.

During the Balkan Wars of 1912–13, he commanded artillery batteries and fought in most battles of the two conflicts. In 1918 he was commanding an artillery battalion in the Crete Division in the Macedonian front and fought in the Vardar offensive. During the Greco-Turkish War of 1919–1922, he served as head of artillery for the 5th Infantry Division (the renamed Crete Division), and finally as military commandant of Bandirma.

After the war he served as senior artillery commander and divisional commander, until his retirement on 10 October 1929 with the rank of major general.
