= Jan Jacobsz. Schipper =

Bookseller, printer, and theatre poet (1616–1669)

- Born: Jan Jacobsz. Dommekracht; 1616; Amsterdam
- Died: 1669
- Other names: J.J. Schipper
- Occupation(s): Bookseller, printer, poet
- Years active: 1636-1669

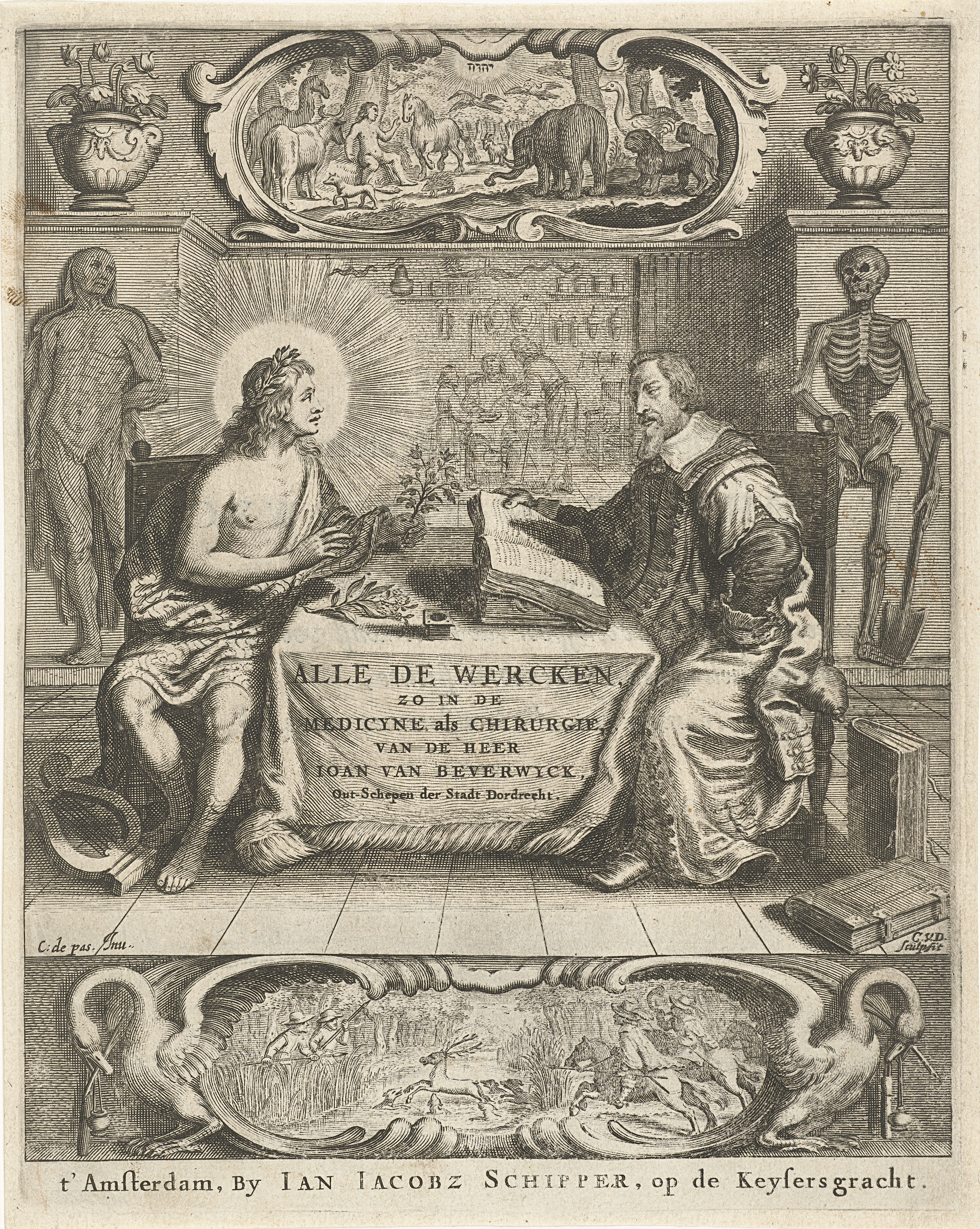
Title page for Joan van Beverwyck, Alle de wercken, zo in de medicyne als chirurgie, Amsterdam, J.J. Schipper (publisher) 1656

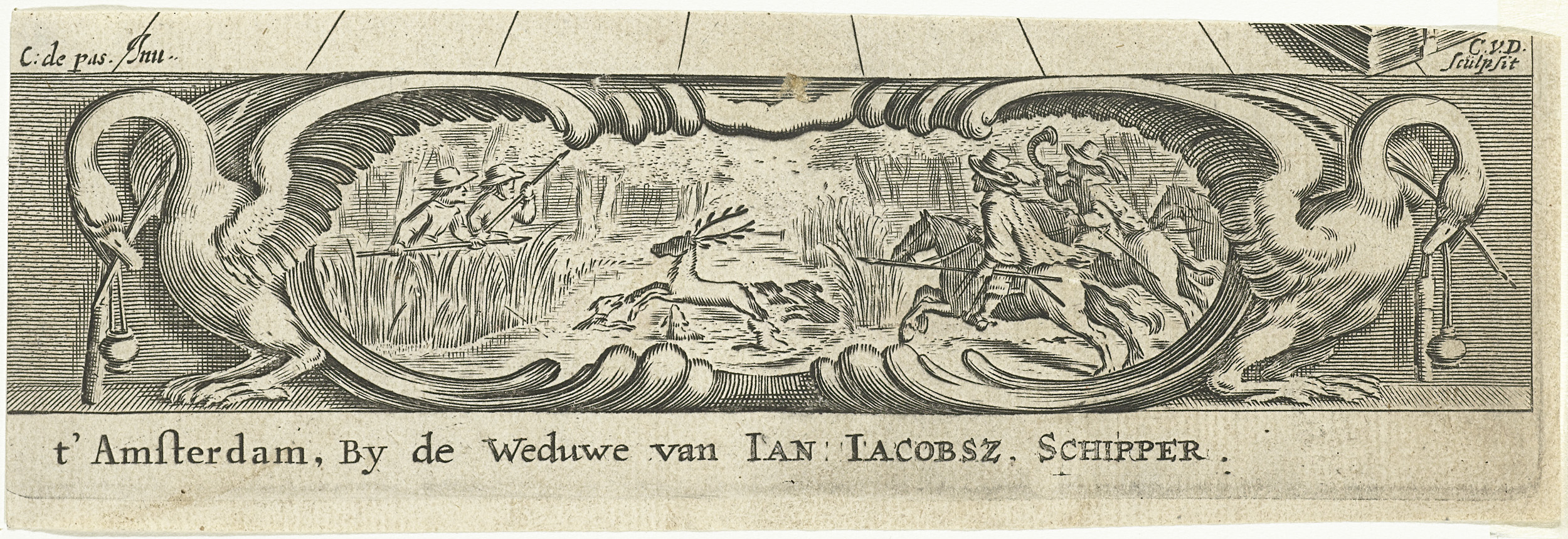
Fragment of title page with cartouche of a deer hunt, bordered by swans, printed by the widow of Jan Jacobsz. Schipper

Jan Jacobsz. Schipper (1616-1669) was a bookseller, printer, and theatre poet in Amsterdam.

== Personal life ==
Schipper was born to Jacob Claesz. and Neeltje Leyen in Amsterdam. The surname Schipper is in fact a pseudonym derived from his father’s work as a skipper, and his actual surname is Dommekracht, or Dommescracht. Not much is known about Schipper’s early life, however he was registered to the Amsterdam bookseller’s guild on 28 October 1636, and married Suzanna Veselaers on 27 August 1650. In 1673 his widow started a printing house with Joseph Athias.

== Work ==
Schipper was best known as the publisher of Calvin, De Brune, and particularly for Cats’ complete works. He was also an accomplished translator of French prose, and a theatre poet in his own right. His most successful works are two plays about the “incomparable” Ariane, which featured the first woman to perform in Amsterdam theatre, Ariane Nooseman.

== Notable works ==
- Alle de Wercken, Cats 1655, 2nd print 1661
- Onvergelijkelijke Ariane, Schipper 1644 and 1655
- De razende Roelant, Ariosto 1649, tr. Schipper
- De bezadigde Roelant, François de Rosset 1649, tr. Schipper
- Ariane, Jean Desmarets 1621, tr. Schipper
