= Arbuscula =

Roman actress (d. between 54 and 35 BCE)

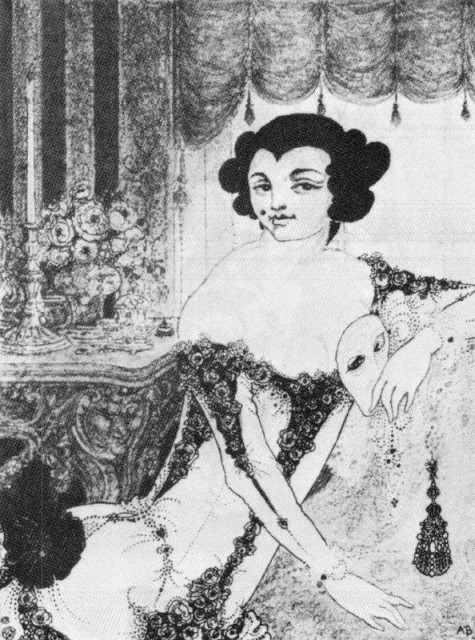
Arbuscula by Aubrey Beardsley. Illustration for History of Dancing from the Earliest Ages to the Our Times (1898)

Arbuscula (Latin: Arbuscŭla; d. between 54 and 35 BCE) was a woman stage performer of ancient Rome. She was a celebrated actor in pantomimes during the 1st century BCE, when most of the female parts at the time were played by men at least in tragedy.

Cicero speaks of her in 54 BC as having been very successful, and having given him great pleasure. Horace mentions her as having been hissed and booed at by an audience, though it is said she did not care that the common people booed her, and remarked, "It is enough the knights still applaud me."
