= Vincenza Armani =

Italian opera singer

Vincenza Armani (c. 1530 in Venice – 11 September 1569), was an Italian actress, singer, poet, musician, lace maker and sculptor. She was one of the most famous Italian actresses of the period and known as the 'Divine Vincenza Armani'. She and Barbara Flaminia were the two most known actresses of their time and described as great rivals. Being one of the two first well-documented actresses in Italy, which was the only country where actresses existed at the time, she belonged to the first actresses in modern Europe.

== Life ==
Vincenza Armani was from Venice. She is first mentioned when she performed the part of a man in the theatre company of Zan Ganassa in Mantua in 1565. She later became the prima donna of the famous commedia dell'arte Gelosi Company of Flaminio Scala. In 1566, Barbara Flaminia is mentioned as her rival of fame, and in 1567, the two performed a famous competition scene in Mantua.

The first Italian actress known by name was the actress Lucrezia Di Siena, whose name is on a contract of actors from 10 October 1564, but Armani was, alongside Barbara Falminia, the first well-documented actress in Italy, in Europe, and in commedia dell'arte, and the first Italian prima donna. Aside from acting, she also acted as a singer.

Garzoni called her "Divina" and "A perfect commedienne" and said of her that:

"... by demonstrating the same verbal ability as Cicero, she placed the art of acting at the same level as rhetoric."

Aside from her stage career, she wrote poetry and composed songs. She manufactured lace, and sculptures of wax.

Vincenza Armani was reportedly poisoned, possibly by a former lover. Her lover and colleague Adriano Valerini wrote a famous memorial speech to her in 1570.
