= Rachel Trépeau =

French actress

Rachel Trépeau (fl. 1607 – fl. 1616), was a French stage actor. She was one of the first French actresses known by name.

She is the most well documented French actress of the early 17th-century together with the sisters Marie Vernier, Mlle La Porte, and Colombe Vernier, Mlle Montfleury, but very little is known of her.

She was a member of the Comédiens du Roi at the Hôtel de Bourgogne under her mentor Valleran le Conte between 1607 and 1612. She is noted to be a member of Gros-Guillaume theatre company in 1616.

Rachel Trépeau is the first actress named in a legal contract in the 17th-century: on December 1, 1607, she was included in an association of actors led by Valleran, “represented” by Nicolas Gasteau. In 1610, she and Gasteau jointly held one-half shares in another troupe led by Valleran. Trépeau signed several legal documents between 1610 and 1612, and as she did not need the permission of a husband, which had been necessary for a wife in the law of the time period, she was evidently not married, but Nicolas Gasteau did represent her on occasion.

While the roles played by the actors in Paris during this time period is generally not known, she was evidently a principal actress of the company, and the only contemporary female actor sharing in the income of the company Comediens du roi.
