= Jerónima de Burgos =

Spanish stage actress (1580–1641)

Jerónima de Burgos (1580 – 27 March 1641), was a Spanish stage actress and theater actor-manager director.

== Life and career ==
Jerónima de Burgos was born in Valladolid. She married the stage actor and manager Pedro de Valdés (1568–1640). They had no known children, but she was the aunt of the actress Jerónima Sánchez.

Jerónima de Burgos and her husband was employed in the theater company of Alonso de Cisneros and Jerónimo Velázquez between 1594 and 1596, and performed with them in Lisbon in Portugal and Toledo in Spain.

Around 1600, her husband created his own theater company in cooperation with Nicolás de los Ríos, Antonio Granados, Alonso de Heredia and Baltasar Pinedo, and she performed as a member of his theater in Spain and Portugal, such as in the cities Badajoz, Lisbon, Madrid, Salamanca, Segovia, Sevilla, Toledo, Valencia, Valladolid and Zaragoza.

By the 1610s, she was acknowledged as a great stage actor by contemporary wittnesses. In 1613 her husband was official managing director and Lope de Vega their playwright, and she played several important roles in the plays of Lope de Vega in the biggest stage of Spain at the time, such as in Madrid, Segovia, Lerma, Ventosilla, Toledo and Valencia. In 1613 she performed in La dama boba (1613) by Lope de Vega in the role of Nise, and Cristóbal Suárez de Figueroa referred to her in his Plaza universal de todas ciencias y artes from 1615 as one of the greatest actresses in Spain.

She was not only active as an actor. On several occasions, she is noted to have acted as the manager and director of the company. In 1632, she was officially given the title director, when she directed and performed the comedy "Los milagros del desprecio" for the king himself. She is noted to have maintained valuable contacts with influential patrons. A letter is preserved from 1612, in which she asked Diego Sarmiento de Acuña, count of Gondomar, where she asked him to use his influence to acquire the necessary license for her company to perform in Valladolid.

Jerónima de Burgos is noted as one of the love interests of Lope de Vega, who mentioned her on several occasions in his preserved correspondence.
