= Lucrezia Di Siena =

Italian stage actress

Lucrezia Di Siena (fl. 1564), was a stage actress active in Rome and other locations in the Italian peninsula. She is known as one of the first, and possibly the very first, identified female actor in Europe since antiquity; at the very least, she is believed to have been the first woman in Europe to sign a theatrical contract.

== Career ==
There are unconfirmed references to actresses predating Lucrezia Di Siena. The earliest known professional acting company since antiquity whose members are identified by name originated in Padova in 1545. However, all recorded members of that troupe were men, and because no professional actress is known by name before the 1560s, historians have generally assumed that actresses were absent from professional theatre prior to that period. During the entry of king Henri II and Catherine de Medici to Lyon in 1548, the tragicomedy La Calandria by Bernardo Dovizi was performed, of which Brantome noted that it was "very well performed by the actors and actresses, who were very beauiful, spoke very well, and were extremely graceful"; however, it is not known if they were professional actors or if they were people of other professions temporary engaged to participate in the festivities by staging a play. A letter from Mantova in 1562 mention an unnamed actress from Rome performing with "Moorish dances".

Lucrezia Di Siena signed a signature for an acting contract by a Commedia dell'arte theatre company in Rome on 10 October 1564, in which she is stated to be able to sing, do declamation and play music. This is the first time any professional actress is mentioned in Italy since antiquity and the first time any actress known by name to perform in Commedia dell'arte. All other members of the company were men.

She is assumed to have been a former courtesan She was described as a cortigiana onesta, a background commonly associated with the first generation of actresses in Italy. Such a background was considered suitable for the stage because courtesans of this class were typically educated in singing, declamation, music, and dance—skills that were otherwise rarely accessible to women at the time.

The absence of a recorded surname, combined with the honorific title Domina—a common form of address for courtesans—has been cited as further support for this interpretation.

She may have been the same person as the actress "La Donna Lucrezia" depicted in the engraving (c. 1577-1585) of the Fossard collection, reprinted by Duchartre, and the "Madonna Lucrezia, Widow" in Bernardino Lombardi's l'Alchemista (1583).

After this, actresses became common in Italy, and she was followed only three years later by Vincenza Armani and Barbara Flaminia.
