= Barbara Flaminia =

Italian stage actress

Barbara Flaminia (c. 1540–1586) was an Italian stage actress. She was one of the earliest actresses known in Europe and internationally known in her time. She and Vincenza Armani were the two most famed actresses in Italy in the 1560s and were described as great rivals.

She is first mentioned in a performance in Mantova in 1562, where she was noted to have been from Rome. She was engaged in the Comedia dell'arte Hortensia, the Desiosi company and the "Compagnia del Ganassi", and she performed at the court of Alfonso Gonzaga and the Imperial court of Maximilian II. She is mentioned as performing in Vienna in 1569 and in Prague in 1570, where she was likely the first actress known by name to have performed. She was active in Paris in 1570–74 and in Spain 1574–84. Throughout her career she was incredibly popular with the public, who flocked to her performances.

At some point she married Alberto Naselli, a comedian and actor who lead a troupe under the stage name Zan Ganassa. She toured the courts of Europe as part of her husband's troupe, often under her own stage name, Hortensia.
