= Angelica Martinelli =

Italian stage actress

Angelica Martinelli also known as Angelica Alberghini (fl. 1578 – fl. 1601) was an Italian stage actress.

She was married to the actor-manager Drusiano Martinelli, and toured with his famous theatre company to Spain, France and England. She was a star attraction of the company and renowned as a stage actress.

In 1578, she may have been the first actress to perform in London and in England when she performed with the theatre company of her spouse during their visit to London. This was a time when women were banned from performing on stage in England, and there were to be no English actresses until 1660.

She may also have been the first actress to perform on stage in Spain: 1587, when there was a heated debate on whether Spain should ban or allow women on stage (it ended with the later alternative), it was pointed out by those in favor of actresses that women had already performed onstage in Spain in the person of Angelica Martinelli.
