= Marie Vernier =

French actress

Marie Vernier or Venier (fl. 1590 – fl.1627), was a French stage actress, known also as Mlle La Porte. She is commonly thought to be the first French actress to be known by name.

== Life ==
Vernier was from Sens, where her father was procureur au bailliage.

A 1602 contract indicates Marie's marriage to Mathieu Lefebvre, a native of La Roche-Bernard in Brittany. Lefebvre, who was born in 1574, performed under the stage-name of La Porte in Paris between 1594 and 1609. At this time, Vernier was a fille majure, meaning that she was over the age of 25 and of free from guardianship.

Two other legal documents offer some insight into the lives of the Vernier and La Porte. In December 1622, Marie Venière petitioned for and was granted separation of property from her husband. In June 1624, Mathieu Lefebvre, “desirous of retiring into some private place to live there the rest of his days,” gave all his property, real and personal, to his wife in return for an annual pension of 150 livres. A petition for separation was an action available only to women and “depended legally on a husband’s failure to maintain his wife.” These petitions could also be motivated by the need to protect the household from creditors; perhaps that was the case here, since Lefebvre later donated all of his property to his wife.

By 1627 Mary Venière was remarried to a lawyer, Jean Rémond, who practiced at the Parlement of Paris, France's highest court. Isaac de Laffemas sued Marie Vernier for defamation in 1627.

=== Career ===
Vernier was the leading lady and co-director of Valleran-Lecomte's theatre company, which performed in Hôtel de Bourgogne in Paris and toured the country and the Spanish Netherlands. Vernier is confirmed to have performed in Paris from at least 1604 onwards. She was foremost a tragedienne.

Marie Vernier was the first Parisian actress to be known by name. After her marriage, she became known as Mlle La Porte (Mademoiselle could be used by married women at the time, since the title Madame was largely reserved for upper-class women): her sister was known as Mlle Montfleury after marriage.

While professional French actresses were reportedly active in France in the second half of the 16th century, they are seldom mentioned by name and normally only very briefly. Nine contemporary actresses beside her are briefly mentioned: Jeanne Crevé, Judith Le Messier, Elisabeth Diye, Mlle Dufresne, Isabelle Paquette Le Gendre, Francoise Petit, Marguerite Dugoy, Renée Berenger and Rachel Trepeau, but only Marie Vernier and Rachel Trepeau are documented to any large degree.
