= Ana Muñoz =

Spanish actress (c.1589–c.1613)

Ana Muñoz (born before 1589 – died after 1613), was a Spanish stage actress, known particularly for her skill in comedy.

She married the actor-manager Antonio de Villegas in 1589, and toured as an actor and member of his company around Spain for over twenty years. She was a successful stage artist and is mentioned several times by contemporaries with admiration, among others by Agustín de Rojas. When her spouse died in 1613, she took over his theatre company and acted as its manager. She was a pioneer as an actress, which was relatively new in Spain in the late 16th century, as well as a female theater manager.
