= Dimitrios Levidis =

Greek composer

Dimitrios Levidis (Greek: Δημήτριος Λεβίδης; 8 April 1885 or 1886, Athens - 29 May 1951, Palaio Faliro) was a Greek composer, later naturalized French (1929).

== Background ==
He descended from an aristocratic family with Byzantine roots in Constantinople. Levidis studied in Athens, Lausanne and Munich. His teachers included Friedrich Klose, Felix Mottl and Richard Strauss, the latter being his composition teacher from 1907 to 1908. Levidis won the Franz Liszt Prize for his Piano Sonata op.16. After a short period in Greece he settled in Paris (1910–1932), served in the French Army during World War I and took French nationality in 1929.

== Career ==
He wrote abundantly, in many genres, with a refined technique combining Straussian harmony and Ravelian impressionism, also exploiting Greek modes, in an appealing style of greater homogeneity than that of many of his Greek contemporaries. Levidis was more impressed by Debussy's harmonic brevity as shown in his last works. He was a notable experimenter with novel combinations and new instruments: His interest in new sounds led him to be among the first to write for the Ondes Martenot (his Poème symphonique, a modernistic Symphonic Poem for Electrical Instrument and Orchestra, (op.43-B) was given on the occasion of the first public appearance of the instrument, premiered on 20 April 1928, at the Paris Opéra) and conducted by Rhene-Baton. The soloist was Maurice Martenot, performing for the first time in public on an electronic device of his own invention. Following its impressive debut, the conductor Leopold Stokowski brought Martenot to the United States to perform the Levidis work with the Philadelphia Orchestra. This led to a tremendous flurry of composition for the device.

After his return to Greece in about 1932, Levidis was appointed to the Ministry of Education to teach at the Hellenic Conservatory and at the Music Lyceum. In 1934, he founded the Phaleron Conservatory, later subsumed into the Hellenic Conservatory, and he was president of the Union of Greek Composers (1946–1947). He was in Paris again from 1947 to 1948.

== Work list ==
(List not Complete)

- Menuet (1898)
- Tristesse (1899)
- Piano Impromptus (1902)
- Erste Griechische Romantische Piano Sonate op.16 (1908)
- Preludes In d. minor (1910)
- Divertissent Orch. (1911)
- 4 Persian Rubajats (1912–1914)
- Chant payen for oboe and strings
- Divertissement op.25 (1911)
- Patre et Nymphe (1924) Ballet
- Poeme Symphonique, pour solo d'Ondes Musicales et Orchestre, op.43-B (1928)
- De Profundis (1929)
- 4 tableaux en un acte op.45(?)
- L' illiade, Orch. Oratorio. (1942–1943)
- La Terre dans l'Espace. Symphonic Poem for Orchestra
- The Talisman of The Gods op.41 ballet. (incomplete) (1925–1945)
