= Ariana Nozeman =

Dutch actress (c. 1627–1661)

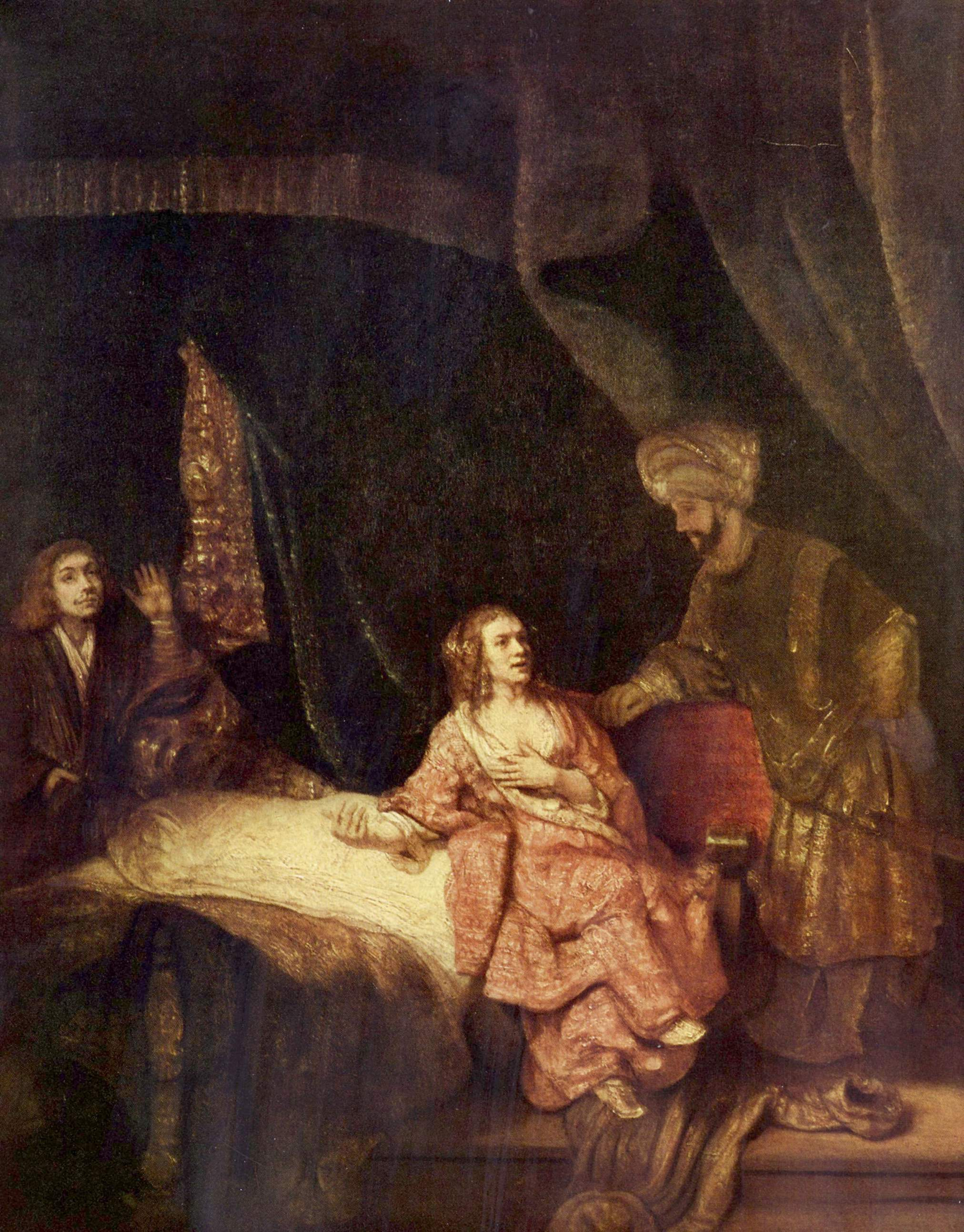
Ariana Nozeman (middle) in a painting by Rembrandt (1655)

Ariana Nozeman (also Adriana Noseman or Nooseman; née van den Bergh; c. 1627 - December 7, 1661) was a Dutch actress who was the first woman to play a leading role in a public play in The Dutch Republic. She made her debut on stage on April 19, 1655, at the Amsterdam Schouwburg (Amsterdam Theater) in a play by Jan Jacobsz. Schipper which incidentally bore her name ‘Onvergelijkelijke Ariana’ (‘Incomparable Ariana’).

== Early life ==
The daughter of actor and playwright Adriaan van den Bergh, Ariana was born in Middelburg between 1626 and 1628. Her father had a travelling theatre company and translated and adapted several English dramas for the Dutch stage. Among them has been Thomas Kyd's “The Spanish Tragedy” - renamed Don Jeronimo (1621) in Dutch. It was possible Ariana could not write.

At that time it was quite common for women and children in travelling theatre companies to appear on stage as these groups often consisted of actors’ families. It is believed that she later joined the troupe of Jan Baptist van Fornenbergh. This company took the tradition of Dutch theatre to distant corners of Europe touring the north of Germany and Scandinavia, performing at fairs as well as royal courts such as the one of Swedish Queen Christina (1653). While in Hamburg, the actress married her colleague, the actor Gillis Nozeman in the Reformed Church of nearby Altona. Ariana and Gillis became known as the first actors’ couple in Dutch theatre history.

== Professional life ==
On June 30, 1655, the name of Ariana Nozeman was recorded for the first time in the Amsterdam theatre archives. The actress was paid 76,50 Dutch florins for 17 performances; she was even paid more than her husband as she brought her own opulent costumes to the scene. Unlike Italy and France, where women had already made their appearances on the public stage, women's stage-roles in the Dutch Republic were still generally being played by men in the first half of the 17th century. The resignation of six actors at the Amsterdam Schouwburg (Theatre) may have led to Ariana Nozeman's debut.

Nozeman mainly played serious roles. She was the first actress to perform Badeloch in the historical play Gijsbrecht van Aemstel by Joost van den Vondel, one of Holland's most famous poets of the 17th century. She was rarely seen in farces or comical acts and she also sang. She is also credited as being the first ballet dancer in The Netherlands. She was often seen on stage together with her husband either as a couple or as antagonists. Their daughter Maria Nozeman (born 1652) followed in her mother's footsteps, entering the stage at the age of six years. The Nozemans supplemented their theatre incomes by running an inn called The Camel on one of Amsterdam's canals.

== Calvinist opposition ==
By putting herself on public show, Nozeman faced the disapproval of the stern Dutch Reformed Church. Simon Schama in The Embarrassment of Riches notes: “In 1655 the first actress appeared in the Amsterdam theater, strengthening the clergy’s view that it was the sink of the vilest iniquity. But Adriana Nozeman went on to make an illustrious career there nonetheless”. The Netherlands, in spite of its Calvinist character, was a secular society and Amsterdam, the capital of the Dutch Republic, was known for its free and tolerant climate. Banned philosophers such as Locke and Descartes had their works published in the city, and pornography was also printed here.

== Death ==
Nozeman died on December 7, 1661, in Amsterdam, possibly from heartache or as a victim of the plague. Three months earlier, she had lost her 7-year-old son, Mathijs. She was buried in the Oude Kerk (Old Church) cemetery, now in the heart of Amsterdam's famous red light district. Her death was a great loss for the Amsterdam Schouwburg, which contracted immediately four new actresses to replace her.

In 1955, three hundred years after her stage debut, the city council of Amsterdam honoured her memory with a street named Ariana Nozemanstraat in the western part of the city.
