= Gabrielli =

Gabrielli is a surname originating in Italy. Due to Italian diaspora, it is also common in other countries such as the United States, Brazil, Argentina, Uruguay, Chile and France. The surname Gabrielli derives from the given name Gabriello (a variation of the common given name Gabriele) and it means "son of Gabriello".

A common surname variation is Gabrieli.

Notable people with the surname include:

- Gabrielli family: the Italian feudal family from Gubbio, a town in Umbria.
- Andrea Gabrieli (1532/1533–1585), Italian composer and organist
- Caterina Gabrielli (1730–1796), Italian soprano
- Cante dei Gabrielli (c. 1260–c. 1335), Italian nobleman and condottiero
- Cecciolo Gabrielli (1375–1420), Italian nobleman
- Domenick L. Gabrielli (1912–1994), American lawyer, politician and judge
- Domenico Gabrielli (1651–1690), Italian composer and virtuoso violoncello player.
- Elisa Gabrielli (born 1988), American actress, voice artist, and comedian
- Francesco Gabrielli (1588–1636), Italian actor of the commedia dell'arte
- Franco Gabrielli (born 1960), Italian policeman
- Gabriele de' Gabrielli (1445–1511), Italian Roman Catholic bishop and cardinal
- Giovanni Gabrielli (died between 1603 and 1611), Italian actor of the commedia dell'arte
- Giovanni Maria Gabrielli (1654–1711), Italian Catholic cardinal
- Giulio Gabrielli (1604–1677), Italian Catholic cardinal
- Giulio Gabrielli (1748–1822), Italian Catholic cardinal
- Giovanni Gabrieli (c. 1554/1557–1612), Italian composer and organist
- Giuseppe Gabrielli (1903–1987), Italian aeronautics engineer
- Luigi Gabrielli (1790–1854), Italian soldier and military writer
- Nicolò Gabrielli (1814–1891), Italian opera composer
- Noemi Gabrielli (1901–1979), an Italian art historian, superintendent, and a museologist
- Pietro Gabrielli (1931–2026), Italian-born Ecuadorian Roman Catholic prelate
- Pompeo Gabrielli (1780–1861), Italian general and politician
- Rodolfo Gabrielli (born 1951), Argentine governor and minister
- Tommaso Gabrielli (born 1992), Italian motorcycle racer
- Cesar Gabrielli (born 1983), peruvian actor and composer
