= Giovanni Gabrielli (disambiguation) =

Giovanni Gabrielli may refer to:

- Giovanni Gabrieli, composer and organist
- Giovanni Gabrielli (actor), actor of the commedia dell'arte
- Giovanni Maria Gabrielli, cardinal

== See also ==
- Gabrielli family
