= Lucien Bonaparte =

French politician and diplomat (1775–1840)

Lucien Bonaparte Prince of Canino and Musignano
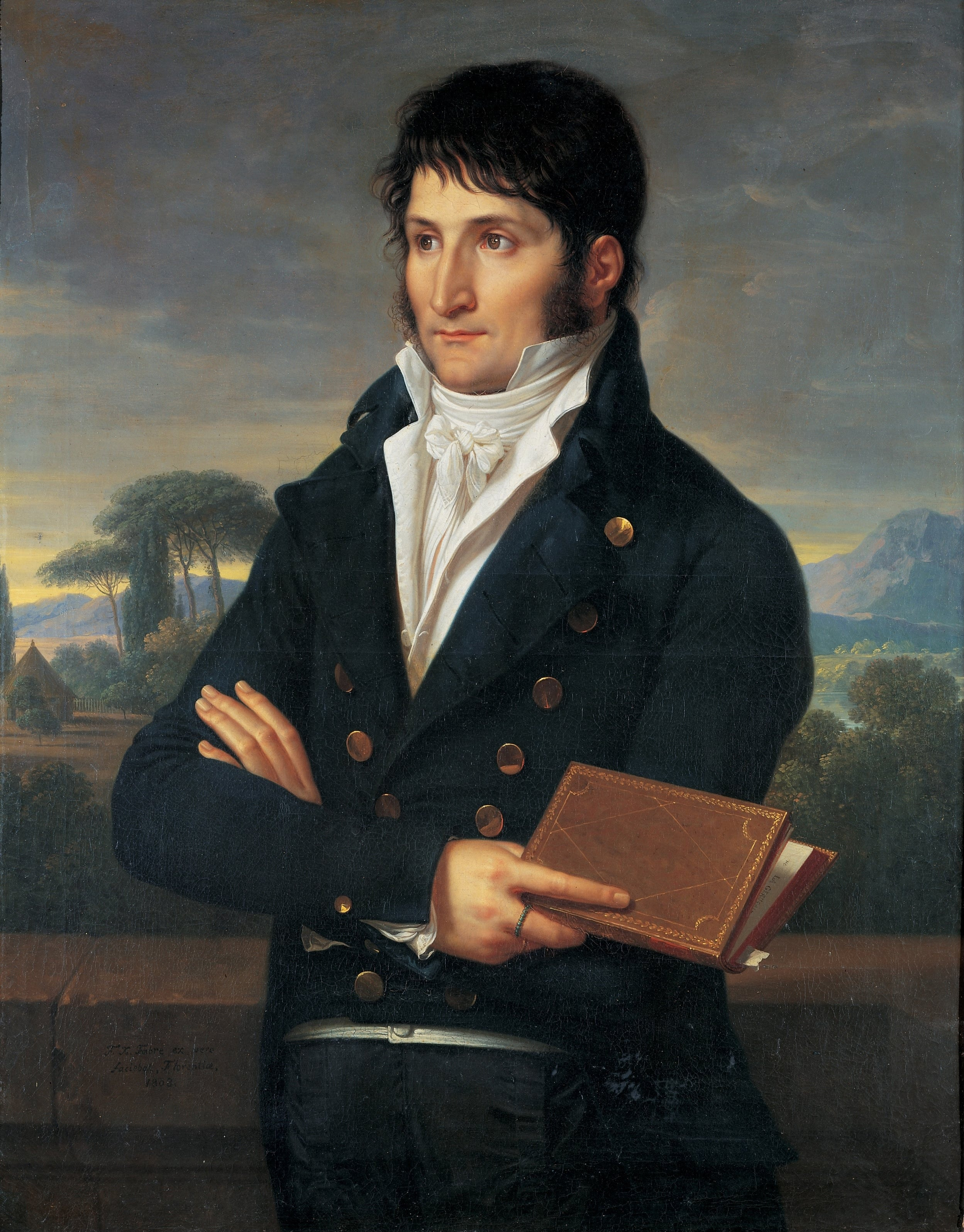
- Lucien Bonaparte at the Villa Rufinella by François-Xavier Fabre, 1808

Minister of the Interior
- In office 25 December 1799 – 7 November 1800
- Preceded by: Pierre-Simon Laplace
- Succeeded by: Jean-Antoine Chaptal

President of the Council of Five Hundred
- In office 23 October 1799 – 12 November 1799
- Preceded by: Jean-Pierre Chazal
- Succeeded by: Antoine Boulay de la Meurthe

Member of the Council of Five Hundred for Liamone
- In office 12 April 1798 – 26 December 1799

Personal details
- Born: 21 May 1775 Ajaccio, Corsica, Kingdom of France
- Died: 29 June 1840 (aged 65) Viterbo, Papal States
- Party: The Mountain (1792–1799)
- Other political affiliations: Jacobin Club (1789–1794)
- Spouses: Christine Boyer (m. 1794; died 1800) Alexandrine de Bleschamp (m. 1802)
- Children: 14, including Charlotte, Lucien, Paul, and Louis
- Parents: Carlo Buonaparte (father); Letizia Ramolino (mother)

Lucien Bonaparte, 1st Prince of Canino and Musignano (French pronunciation: [lysjɛ̃ bɔnapaʁt]; born Luciano Buonaparte; 21 May 1775 – 29 June 1840), was a French politician and diplomat of the French Revolution and the Consulate. He served as Minister of the Interior from 1799 to 1800 and as the president of the Council of Five Hundred in 1799.

The third surviving son of Carlo Bonaparte and his wife Letizia Ramolino, Lucien was the younger brother of Napoleon Bonaparte. As president of the Council of Five Hundred, he was one of the participants of the Coup of 18 Brumaire that brought Napoleon to power in France.

== Early life ==
Lucien was born in Ajaccio, Corsica, on 21 May 1775. He was educated in mainland France, initially studying at the military schools of Autun and Brienne. After his father's death, he attended the seminary of Aix-en-Provence, from which he dropped out in 1789.

== Revolutionary activities ==
Lucien became a staunch supporter of the French Revolution upon its outbreak in 1789, when he was 14 years old. He returned to Corsica at the start of the Revolution, and became an outspoken orator at the Corsican chapter of the Jacobin Club in Ajaccio, where he adopted the alias "Brutus Bonaparte". In 1791, he became a secretary to Corsican patriot Pasquale Paoli, but broke with him in May 1793 (along with his brother Napoleon).

After returning to mainland France, Lucien held a number of minor administrative posts from 1793 until 1795, when he was briefly jailed for his Jacobin activity, during the Thermidorian Reaction. He was released thanks to Napoleon's intervention, who then found him an administrative assignment in the Army of the North.

== Political career ==
In 1798, Lucien was elected member of the Council of Five Hundred for Corsica's Liamone department (although he was not old enough to run for election). In the legislature, he mostly voted with the Neo-Jacobins, and participated in the Coup of 30 Prairial VII. However, Emmanuel Joseph Sieyès' influence and news of the events in Egypt led to a shift in his political stance, and Lucien became one of the main plotters of coup d'état of 18 Brumaire, in which Napoleon overthrew the government of the Directory to replace it by the Consulate.

On 23 October 1799, Lucien was elected president of the Council of Five Hundred. On 9 November 1799 (18 Brumaire Year VIII on the French Republican Calendar), he had pamphlets distributed in Paris that detailed a fake Jacobin plot, which he used to justify the relocation of the Council to the suburban security of Saint-Cloud. The next day, while presiding over a heated council session, Lucien managed to buy time until Napoleon's sudden entrance into the chamber surrounded by grenadiers. During the coup, Lucien swore he would stab his brother in the chest if he ever betrayed the principles of Liberté, égalité, fraternité. The following day, Lucien arranged for Napoleon's formal election as First Consul.

Under the Consulate, Lucien was appointed Minister of the Interior on 25 December 1799. In this capacity, Lucien oversaw the appointment of the first prefects and falsified the results of the constitutional referendum of February 1800. He clashed over the right to oversee Paris police matters with Joseph Fouché, the Minister of Police, who showed Napoleon a subversive pamphlet possibly written by Lucien and effected a breach between the brothers. Some evidence exists that Napoleon himself wrote the pamphlet and scapegoated his brother when it was received poorly. He resigned as minister in November 1800.

Following his resignation, on 7 November 1800 Lucien was sent as ambassador to the court of King Charles IV of Spain, where his diplomatic talents won over the Bourbon royal family and, perhaps as importantly, the minister Manuel de Godoy. In March 1801, Lucien and Godoy signed the Treaty of Aranjuez, establishing the French client kingdom of Etruria. On 4 August 1801 he was created a Grand-Officer of the National Order of the Legion of Honour.

=== Disputes with Napoleon ===
Though he was a member of the Tribunat and on 4 August 1801 was made a senator of the First French Empire, Lucien came to oppose many of Napoleon's ideas. In 1804, with Lucien disliking Napoleon's intention to declare himself as Emperor of the French and to marry Lucien off to a Bourbon Spanish princess, the Queen of Etruria, Lucien spurned all imperial honours and went into self-imposed exile by living initially in Rome, where he bought the Villa Rufinella in Frascati.

== Later years ==
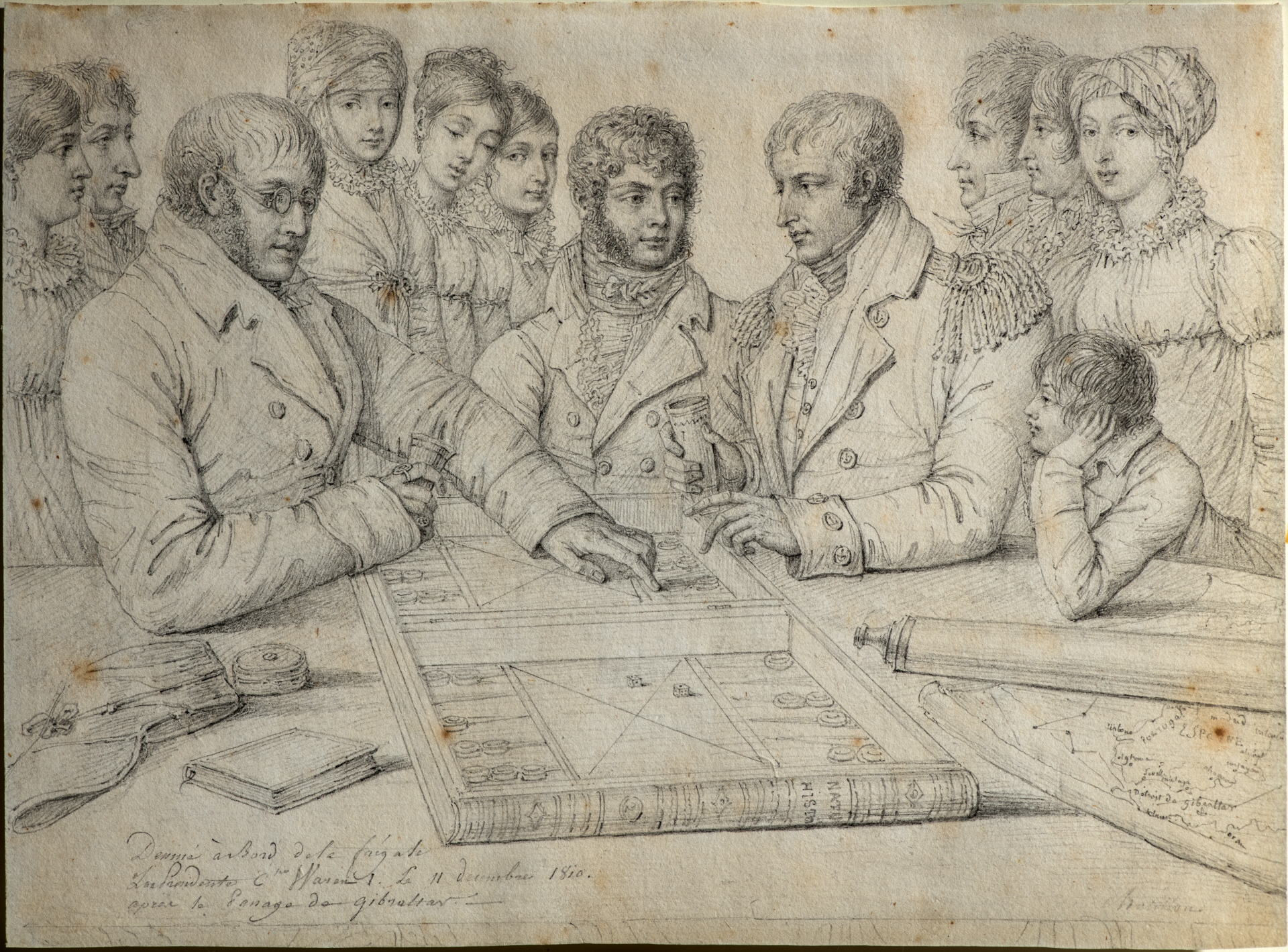
Lucien Bonaparte with his family aboard, sailing to England, 11 December 1810

In 1809, Napoleon increased pressure on Lucien to divorce his wife and return to France, even having their mother write a letter encouraging him to abandon her and return. With the whole of the Papal States annexed to France and the Pope imprisoned, Lucien was a virtual prisoner in his Italian estates, requiring permission of the Military Governor to venture off his property. He ceased to be a senator on 27 September 1810. He attempted to sail to the United States to escape his situation but was captured by the British frigate HMS Pomone. When Lucien disembarked in England, he was greeted with cheers and applause by a local crowd, many of whom saw him as opposed to Napoleon.

The British government permitted Lucien to settle comfortably with his family at Ludlow, and later at Thorngrove House in Grimley, Worcestershire, where he worked on a heroic poem on Charlemagne. Napoleon, believing Lucien had defected to Britain and was thus a traitor, had Lucien omitted from the Imperial almanacs of the Bonapartes from 1811 until his 1814 abdication. Lucien returned to France following his brother's abdication in April 1814. He continued to Rome, where on 18 August 1814 he was made Prince of Canino, Count of Apollino, and Lord of Nemori by Pope Pius VII.

In the Hundred Days after Napoleon's return to France from exile in Elba, Lucien rallied to his brother's cause, and they joined forces once again during Napoleon's brief return to power. His brother made him a French Prince and included his children into the Imperial Family, but this was not recognized by the Bourbons after Napoleon's second abdication. Subsequently, Lucien was proscribed at the Restoration and deprived of his fauteuil at the Académie Française. He was made Prince of Musignano on 21 March 1824 by Pope Leo XII. In 1836 he wrote his Mémoires. He was created Prince Buonaparte on 16 April 1837 by Pope Gregory XVI. He died in Viterbo, Papal States, on 29 June 1840, of stomach cancer, the same disease that claimed his father and, reportedly, his brother Napoleon.

=== Academic activities ===
Lucien Bonaparte was the inspiration behind the Napoleonic reconstitution of the dispersed Académie Française in 1803, where he took a seat. He collected paintings in la maison de campagne at Brienne, was a member of Jeanne Françoise Julie Adélaïde Récamier's salon and wrote a novel, La Tribu indienne. He was an amateur archeologist, establishing excavations at his property in Frascati which produced a complete statue of Tiberius, and at Musignano which rendered a bust of Juno. Bonaparte owned a parcel which had once formed part of Cicero's estate called Tusculum, and was much given to commenting on the fact. In 1825, Bonaparte excavated the so-called Tusculum portrait of Julius Caesar at the Tusculum's forum.

In 1823, Bonaparte was elected as a member of the American Philosophical Society.

== Marriages and children ==
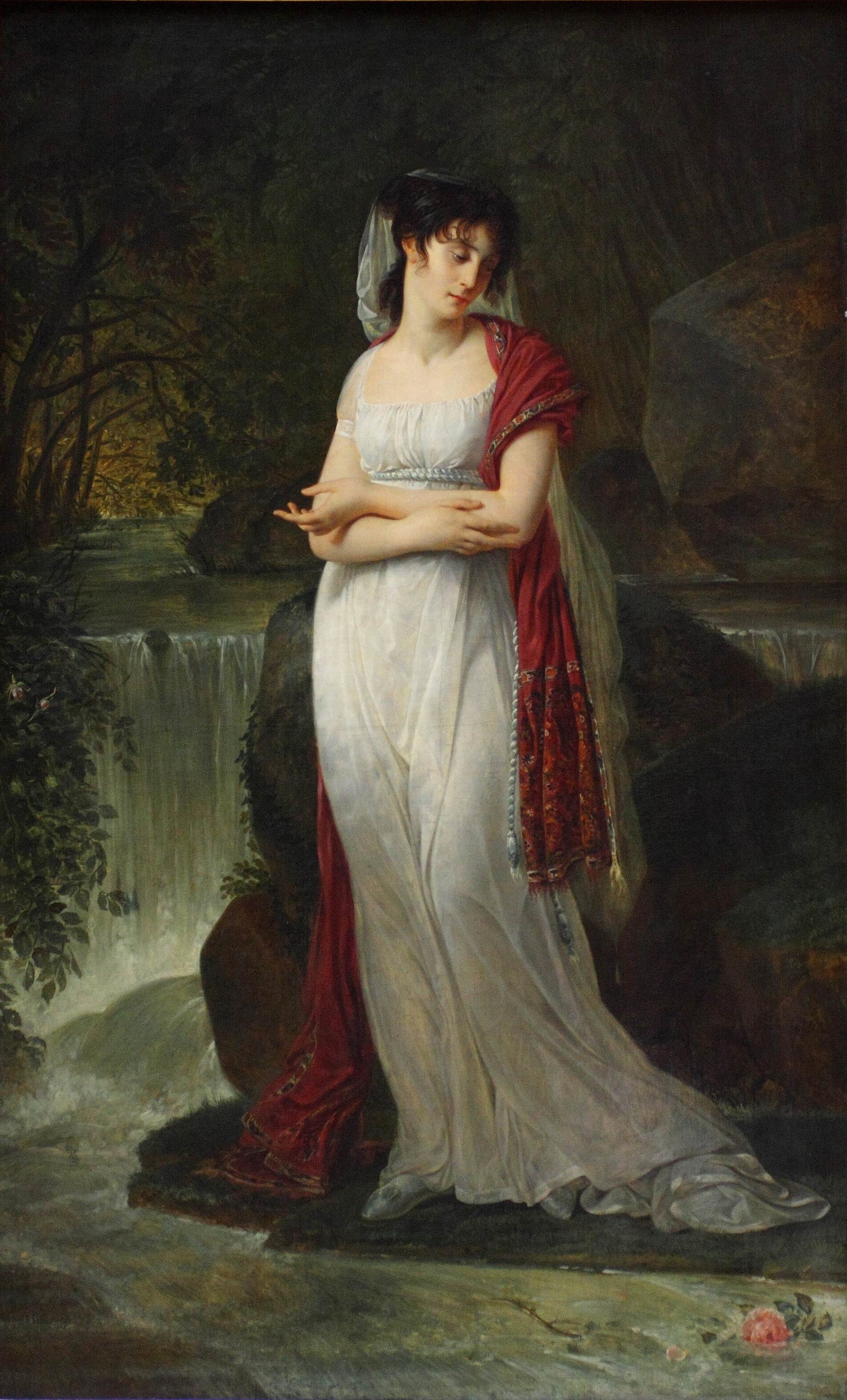
Portrait of Christine Boyer by Antoine-Jean Gros, 1800

His first wife was his landlord's daughter, Christine Boyer (3 July 1771 – 14 May 1800), the illiterate sister of an innkeeper of Saint-Maximin-la-Sainte-Baume, whom he married on 4 May 1794 at Saint-Maximin-la-Sainte-Baume, and by her he had four children:

- Filistine Charlotte then Christine Charlotte Bonaparte (Saint-Maximin-la-Sainte-Baume, 28 February 1795 – Rome, 6 May 1865). She married firstly in Rome on 27 December 1815 Mario Gabrielli, Prince of Prossedi (Rome, 6 December 1773 - Rome, 18 September 1841). She married secondly secretly in 1842 Cavaliere Settimio Centamori. She had eight children by her first husband:
- a son Bonaparte (Augsburg, 13 March 1796 – Augsburg, 13 March 1796);
- Victoire Gertrude Bonaparte (Ajaccio, 1797 – Ajaccio, 1797);
- Christine Charlotte Alexandrine Egypta Bonaparte (Paris, 18 October 1798 – Rome, 19 May 1847); married firstly in Rome on 18 March 1818 Arvid, Count Posse (Sweden, 11 June 1782 - Washington, D.C., May 1826 or San Antonio de Béxar, Tejas, Coahuila y Tejas, 1831), son of Fredrik, Count Posse, and wife Carolina Stedt. This ended in divorce in 1824. She married secondly on 20 July 1824 Lord Dudley Coutts Stuart (London, 11 January 1803 - Stockholm, 17 November 1854). She had one child, a son, by her second husband.

His second wife was Alexandrine de Bleschamp (23 February 1778 – 12 July 1855), widow of Hippolyte Jouberthon, known as "Madame Jouberthon", whom he married in a religious ceremony on 25 May 1803 at Paris and in a civil marriage on 26 October 1803 at Chamant, Plessis, and by her he had ten children:

- Charles Lucien Bonaparte (Paris, 24 May 1803 – Paris, 29 July 1857), the naturalist and ornithologist.
- Laetitia Bonaparte (Milan, 1 December 1804 – Viterbo, 15 March 1871), married in Canino on 4 March 1821 Sir Thomas Wyse (1791 - 1862).
- Joseph Bonaparte (Rome, 14 June 1806 – Rome, 15 August 1807).
- Jeanne Bonaparte (Rome, 22 July 1807 – Iesi, 22 September 1829), married in Canino in June 1825 Marquess Honorato Honorati (1800 - 1856).
- Paul Marie Bonaparte (Canino, 3 November 1809 – off Nauplia, 7 September 1827).
- Louis Lucien Bonaparte (Grimley, Worcestershire, 4 January 1813 – Fano, Ancona, 3 November 1891). A philologist and politician, expert on the Basque language.
- Pierre Napoleon Bonaparte (Rome, 11 October 1815 – Versailles, 7 April 1881).
- Antoine Bonaparte (Frascati, 31 October 1816 – Florence, 28 March 1877), married on 9 July 1839 Marie-Anne Carolina Cardinali (Lucca, 24 February 1823 - Florence, 10 October 1879), without issue.
- Marie Alexandrine Bonaparte (Perugia, 10 October 1818 – Florence, 20 August 1874), married on 29 July 1836 Vincenzo Valentini, Count of Laviano (Canino, 1808 - Porretta Terme, 1858).
- Constance Bonaparte (Bologna, 30 January 1823 – Rome, 5 September 1876), a nun and an abbess in Rome.

== Coat of arms ==
Coat of arms of the Bonaparte family

Coat of arms as Prince of Canino and Musignano

Coat of arms as a French prince during the Hundred Days

Lucien Bonaparte House of Bonaparte Born: 21 May 1775 Died: 29 June 1840
Titles of nobility
New title	Prince of Canino; 1814–1840	Succeeded by Charles Lucien Bonaparte
New title	Prince of Musignano; 1824–1840	Succeeded by Charles Lucien Bonaparte
