= Carbonana Castle =

Medieval fortress in Umbria, Italy

Coordinates: 43.3761°N 12.4669°E

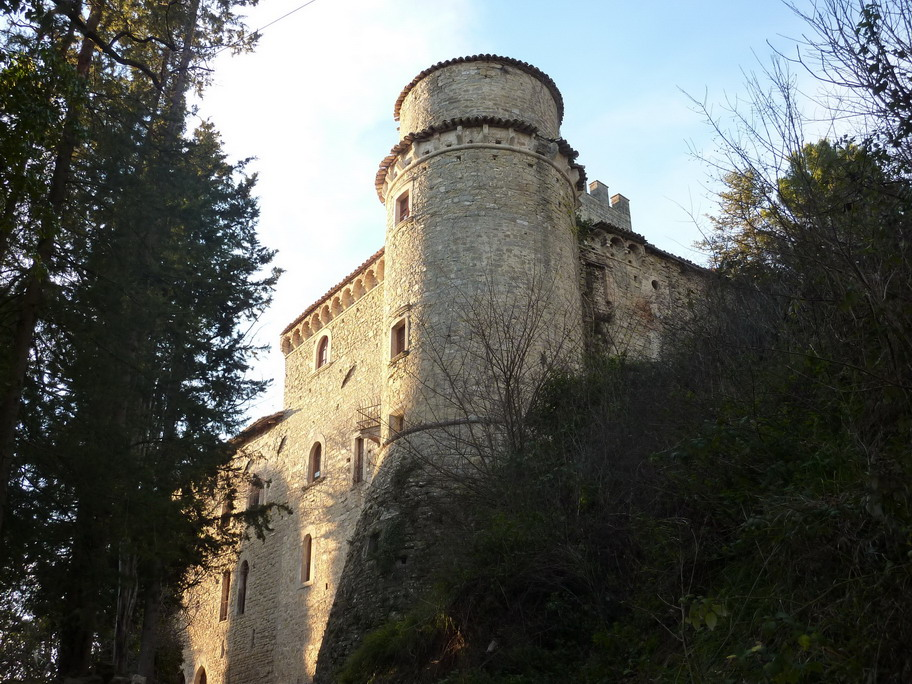
East side of Carbonana Castle

The Castle of Carbonana (Castello di Carbonana) is a medieval fortress located on a promontory overlooking the state road 219 that links Gubbio to Umbertide in the region of Umbria, Italy.

== History ==
The first documentary reference to the castle dates to 1192, when Pope Celestine III conferred castrum carbonana to Bentivoglio, bishop of Gubbio. The first lords of the castle were the descendants of Bino di Pietro of the Gabrielli family. Bino di Pietro was the younger brother of Cante Gabrielli, the podestà of Florence who exiled the Dante Alighieri in 1302. In the 14th century, Gubbio also made use of the fortress and its tower to defend and control of the surrounding territory.

In the 1420s, the castle passed to the Porcelli family as a result of the marriage of Giacomo di Galeotto of the Porcelli family to Checca, the widow of Giacomo Gabrielli, who on her mother’s side belonged to the noble Atti di Sassoferrato family. These Porcelli are descendants of Rigo campsor olim de Florentia (a money changer in Florence) whose presence in Gubbio is documented already in 1286.

The Porcelli assumed the position of counts of Carbonana. During the 16th and 17th centuries, members of the family rose to the highest offices in Gubbio and distinguished themselves as mercenaries of the Republic of Venice. The Porcelli patronized the decoration of the castle’s chapel, the enlargement of the castle on the south side and the construction of the elegant round tower on the south-east angle of the bailey. Since the 16th century, the structure has undergone only minor adjustments which never altered substantially its aspect or its proportions of the castle.

The building was bought in 2011 by private owners, who completed in 2014 a restoration under the supervision of the Soprintendenza ai Beni Architettonici e Paesaggistici of Umbria. .

== Bibliography ==
- P. Cenci, Carte e diplomi di Gubbio dallʼanno 900 al 1200, Perugia, Unione Tipografica Cooperativa, 1915, CCCCXVIII, pp. 317–319.
- G. Ciappelli, Cante Gabrielli, in Dizionario biografico degli italiani, Rome, Istituto dell'Enciclopedia Italiana, 1998.
- S. Tiberini, Castello di Carbonana, in Comune di Gubbio, Tesori nascosti. Castelli e abbazie medievali del territorio di Gubbio, Gubbio, Comune di Gubbio, 2013, p. 33. (ISBN n/a)
- S. Tiberini - S. Merli, Il castello eugubino di Carbonana e i suoi signori (secoli XII-XVIII), Perugia, Deputazione di storia patria per l'Umbria, 2015, pp. 28–29, ISBN 978-88-95331-39-3
- A. Augenti e S. Merli, eds, Il Castello di Carbonana, Storia, Archeologia, Arte, Florence, All’Insegna del Giglio, 2016
