= Biffi =

Biffi is a surname. Notable people with the surname include:

- Carlo Biffi (1605–1675), Italian painter
- G. A. Biffi (1606), an early codifier of written Italian language
- Giacomo Biffi (1928–2015), Archbishop of Bologna
- Jessica Biffi, a contestant on second season of Project Runway Canada TV
- Roberto Biffi (born 1965), Italian football player
- Serafino Biffi (1822–1899), co-founder of the Italian institution with Andrea Verga
