= Christine Boyer =

First wife of Lucien Bonaparte (1771–1800)

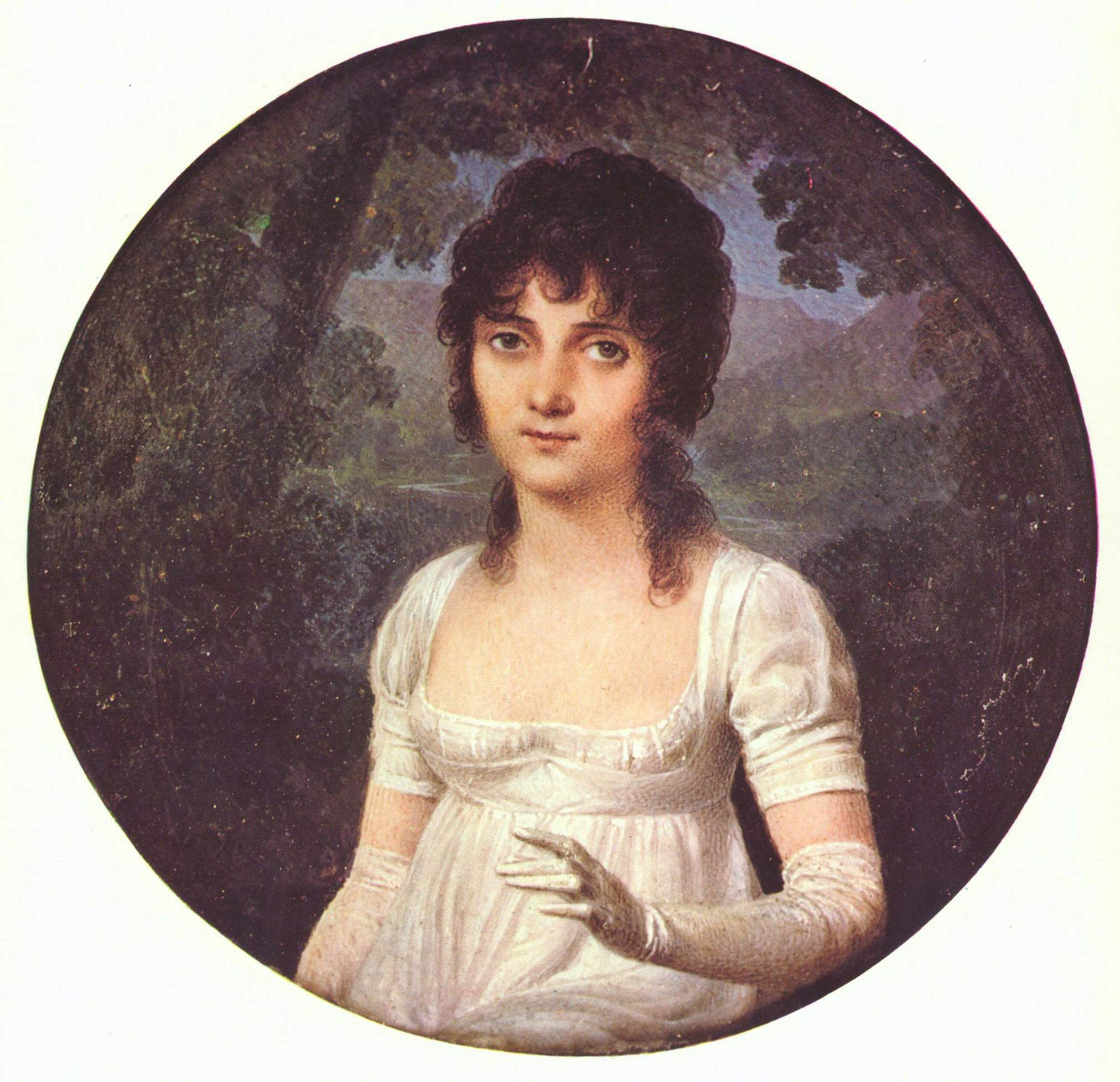
- Miniature of portrait of Christine Boyer by Jean-Baptiste Isabey.
- Full name: Marie Anne Chirstine Boyer
- Born: 3 July 1771; Saint-Maximin-la-Sainte-Baume, France
- Died: 14 May 1800 (aged 28); Hôtel du Châtelet , France
- Buried: Santi Apostoli Giovanni e Andrea, Canino
- Noble family: Bonaparte (by marriage)
- Spouse: Lucien Bonaparte (m. 1794)
- Issue among others...: Charlotte Bonaparte Gabrielli; Christine-Egypta, Lady Dudley Stuart
- Father: Pierre André Boyer
- Mother: Rosalie Fabre

Marie Anne Chirstine Boyer (3 July 1771 – 14 May 1800) was a first wife of Lucien Bonaparte, the younger brother of Napoleon Bonaparte.

== Life ==
Boyer was born in the southern town of Saint-Maximin-la-Sainte-Baume to Pierre André Boyer and Rosalie Fabre. Her father operated as a local innkeeper and minor financial operative, providing a modest upbringing for the family. Like many provincial women of her social standing in late 18th-century France, Christine remained completely illiterate, leaving her unable to sign her own name on official documents.

Her life shifted dramatically during the French Revolution when Lucien Bonaparte was stationed in Saint-Maximin. The two fell in love and married on 4 May 1794. The marriage was a hasty, clandestine affair concluded without the prior knowledge or legal consent of the Bonaparte family. Upon discovery, the match provoked severe backlash. Napoleon Bonaparte, then an ambitious military officer, alongside the family matriarch Letizia Ramolino, fiercely condemned the union. They viewed Christine's lack of dowry, illiterate status, and common lineage as an embarrassing political liability for their grand dynastic ambitions.

== Issue ==
The union produced four children, though infant mortality claimed two of them. The surviving daughters later married into notable European nobility:

- Filistine Charlotte (28 February 1795 – 1865); she married Prince Mario Gabrielli in 1815 and later Cavaliere Settimio Centamori in 1842, leaving eight children from her first marriage.
- A son (1796–1796), who died shortly after birth.
- Victoire Gertrude (1797–1797), who died in infancy.
- Christine Charlotte Alexandrine Égypta (18 October 1798 – 1847); she married Swedish Count Arvid Posse in 1818, which ended in a 1824 divorce. She subsequently remarried to the British politician Lord Dudley Stuart, bearing him one son.

== Death and artistic legacy ==
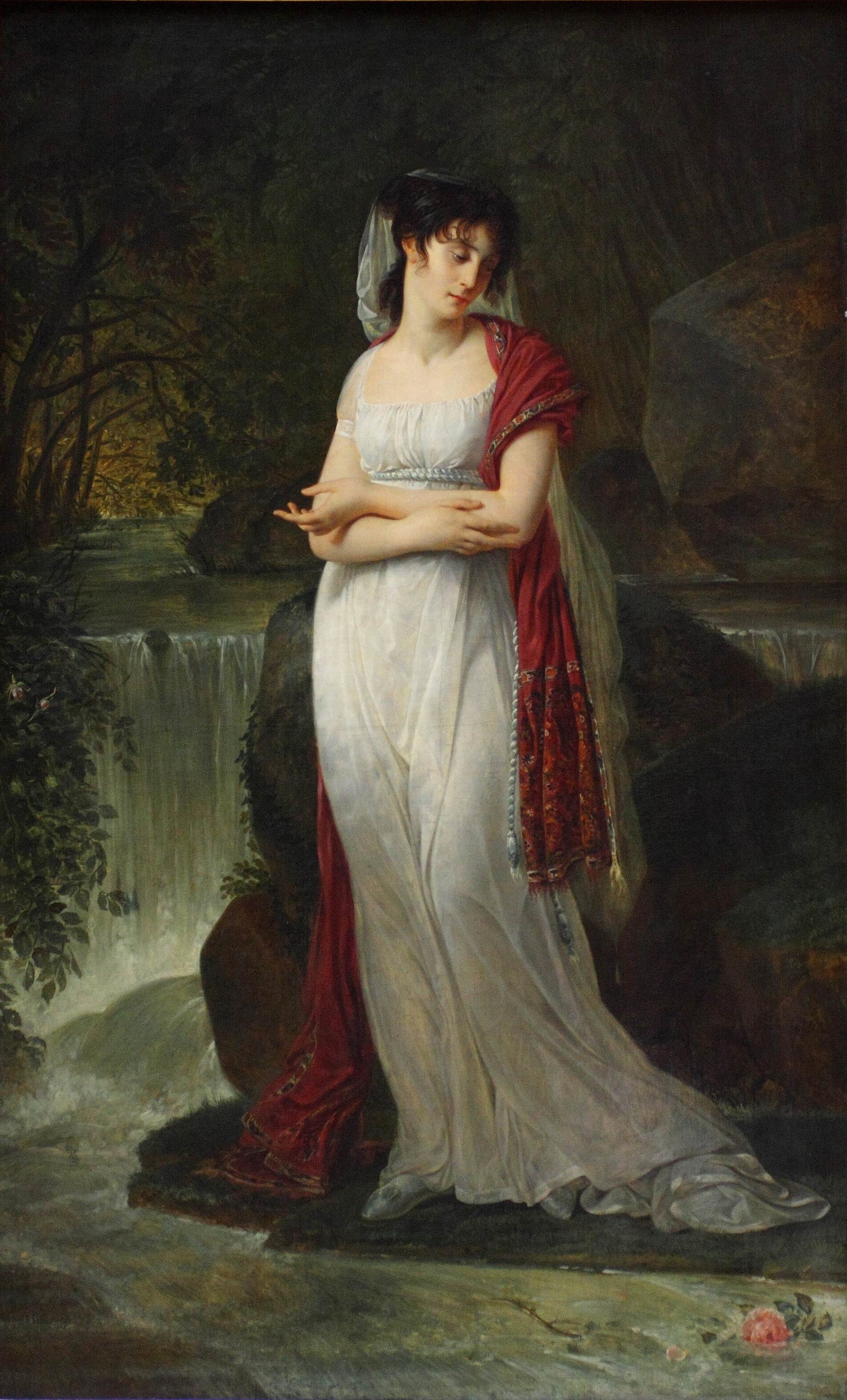
Portrait of Christine Boyer by Antoine-Jean Gros, 1800, currently in the Louvre Museum.

Christine Boyer died in Hôtel du Châtelet at the young age of twenty-eight. Historical records vary regarding the exact circumstances; while encyclopedic entries note she died during a difficult childbirth, specific Napoleonic correspondence indicates she succumbed to a severe pulmonary illness on 14 May 1800 while heavily pregnant, causing the loss of her unborn child as well. Grief-stricken by her sudden passing, Lucien Bonaparte commissioned a grand white marble monument in the park of Château du Plessis-Chamant to honor her memory. Her remains were later transferred to the Santi Apostoli Giovanni e Andrea cemetery in Canino, Lazio, Italy.

Boyer's historical footprint is largely preserved through French neoclassical art. Her full-length, ethereal posthumous portrait, painted in 1800 by the celebrated imperial artist Antoine-Jean Gros, stands as a prominent masterpiece of the era and is permanently curated by the Louvre Museum in Paris.

== Bibliography ==
- Leca, Yacinthe Saint-German (1950). Lucien Bonaparte à Saint-Maximin (in French). Paris: Imprimerie C. Gini.
