= Palazzo del Capitano del Popolo, Gubbio =

Italian palace

Coordinates: 43.3563°N 12.5759°E

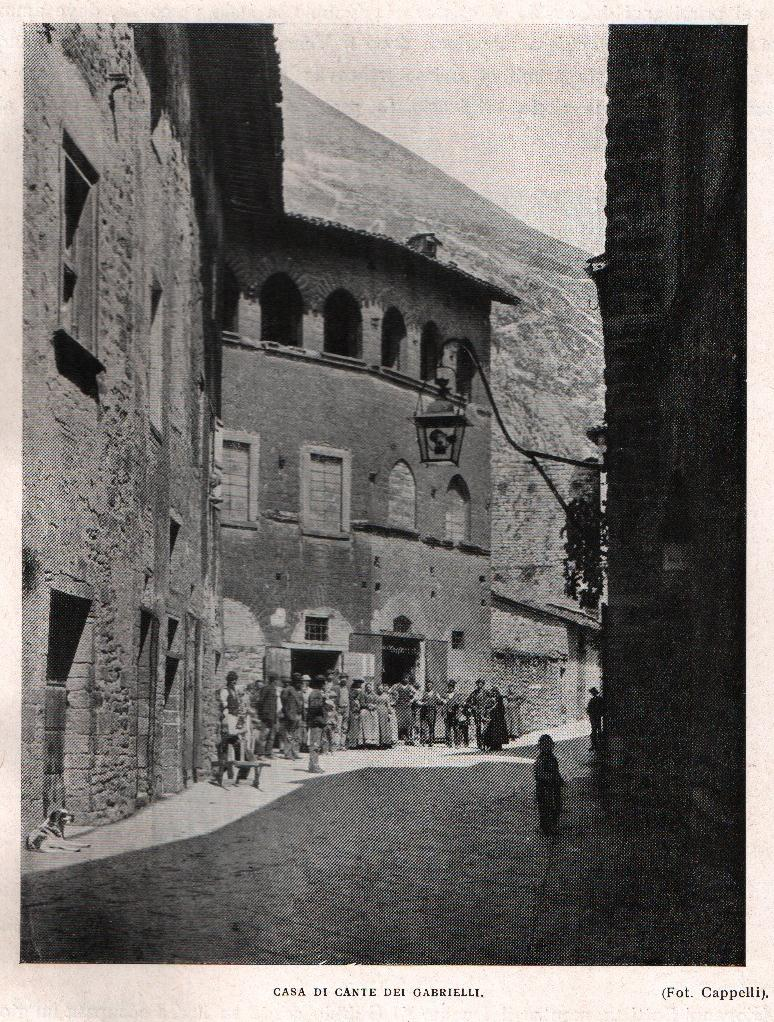
A late 19th-century picture showing the Casa di Cante dei Gabrielli before the restoration

The Palazzo del Capitano del Popolo or Palazzo di Cante Gabrielli is a medieval palace in Gubbio, Italy. It is located in the San Martino's quartiere, near Porta Metauro, at the corner of via Gabrielli and via Capitano del Popolo.

== History ==
The building was erected towards the end of the 13th century by Cante de' Gabrielli (1260-1335), who was Signore or lord of Gubbio with the title of Captain of the People (capitano del popolo). The building was one of the city's first public buildings. The palace, whose architect remains unknown, was used as both private residence and public office by Cante Gabrielli, and was built on land already belonging to his family. This area of the town was largely under the influence of the Gabrielli, as exemplified by the fact that other neighbouring constructions, including the towered family palace still visible along the eponymous street, belonged to them.

In the 14th century, the palace continued to serve as residence of the Captain of the People, until 1384 when the Dukes of Urbino seized Gubbio, the title was abolished and the building was sold. The palace saw several successive owners before the Ceccarelli family acquired it in the 19th century. On 7 December 1967, Alfio Ceccarelli (1920-2010) and Carlo Ceccarelli sold the property, which was acquired by Dante Minelli and subsequently restored it in 1970.

== Description ==
Together with the Palazzo dei Consoli and the Palazzo del Bargello in the same town, the palace is an examples of Umbria Gothic style, as later additions were removed by a restoration at the beginning of the 20th century. Its angled, monochromatic façade, built in the typical local grey limestone, is characterised by four ogival arches on the ground floor, four large ogival windows on the first floor and six smaller ogival windows on the second floor. Floors are marked by string courses running below the windows. The left part of the facade was not restored and still shows later alterations such as square windows and tampered arches.

Nowadays the palace hosts a museum dedicated to medieval torture practices and instruments (also known as Museo Cante Gabrielli. A white round stone on the ground in front of the building is believed to have served as one of the Umbrian altars described in the Iguvine Tablets.

== Sources ==
- Colasanti, Arduino (1905). Gubbio. Bergamo: Istituto Italiano di Arti Grafiche.
