= Carlo Biffi =

Italian painter (1605–1675)

- Born: 1605; Milan
- Died: 1675 (aged 69–70)
- Education: Camillo Procaccini
- Known for: Painting
- Movement: Baroque

Carlo Biffi (1605–1675) was an Italian painter of the Baroque period. He was born in Milan, where he trained with Camillo Procaccini.

== Life and work ==
He was born in Milan in 1605 probably in the parish of St. Giovanni in Laterano. He was a son and pupil of Gianandrea the Elder. In 1621 he was admitted to the Ambrosian Academy. His activity in the cathedral of Milan – the only one certified so far – was remembered in the Annals only starting from 1631, just after the death of Gianandrea. The execution of an Angel started by his father was entrusted to Biffi, for which he still received payments in 1638, but which would then be finished by Vismara. In 1632 he obtained the money for the effigy of the Eternal started by Gianandrea for the chapel of the Madonna of the Tree and sent by him. From that year until 1635 he worked around the relief of Ester and Assuero for a lunette of the facade, already designed and started by the father according to the design of Cerano. The angels are also recognized in the cathedral in the niches of the internal piers on the sides of the Main Cross.

More interesting must have been the activity of Biffi as an engraver: the portrait of Francesco Gabrielli, signed and dated 1633, was cited with praise by Bartsch; Biffi also produced a print with four caricature heads, signed "Biffius" and mentioned by Le Blanc, and four plates he drew and engraved by Cesare Laurenti, with allegorical fights, published in the book Amore and Glory.

Biffi died in 1675. In 1691 his sons Filippo and Giuseppe dedicated a funeral monument to him in the church of St. Antonio Abate.

== Gallery ==
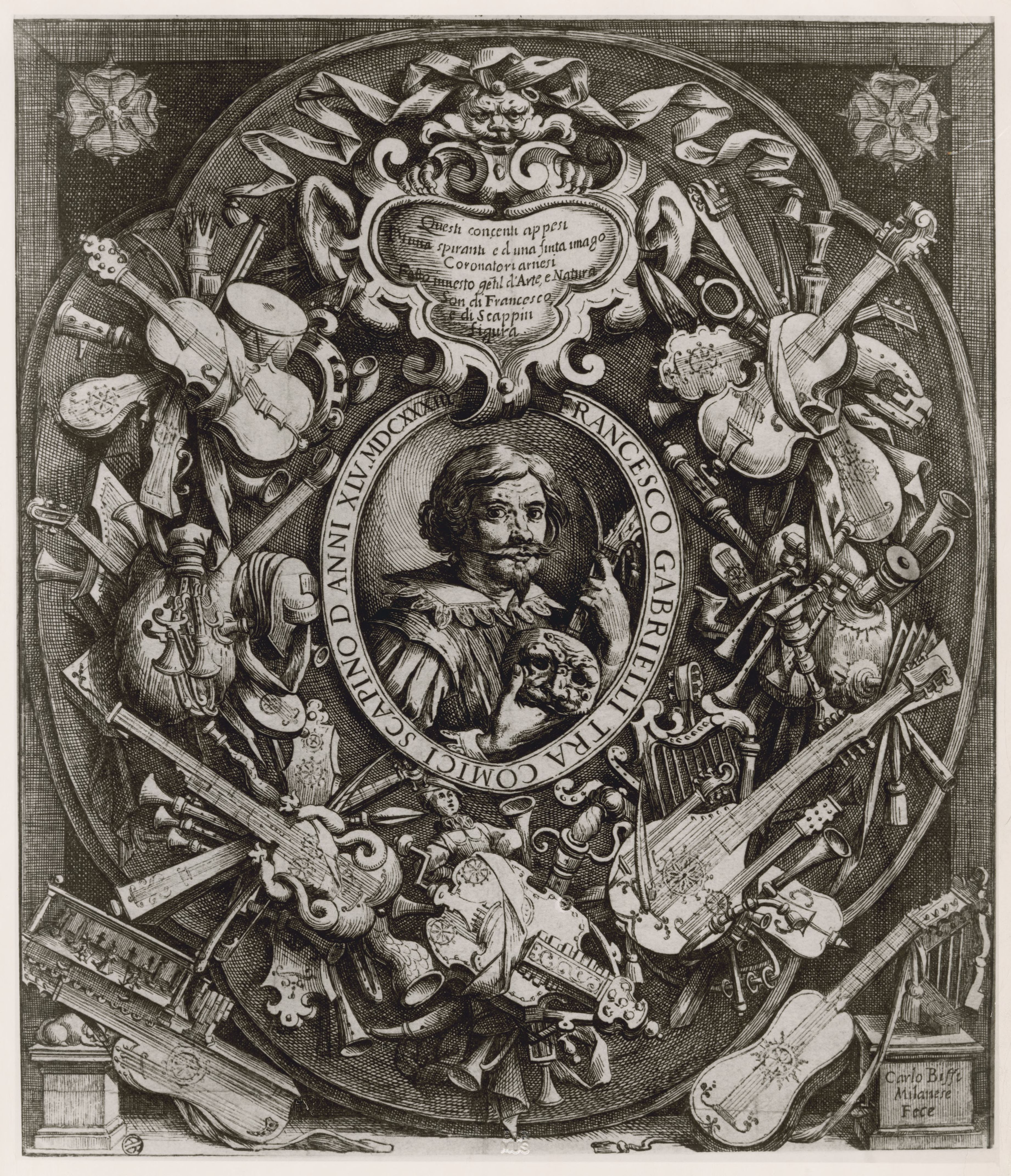
Portrait of Francesco Gabrielli

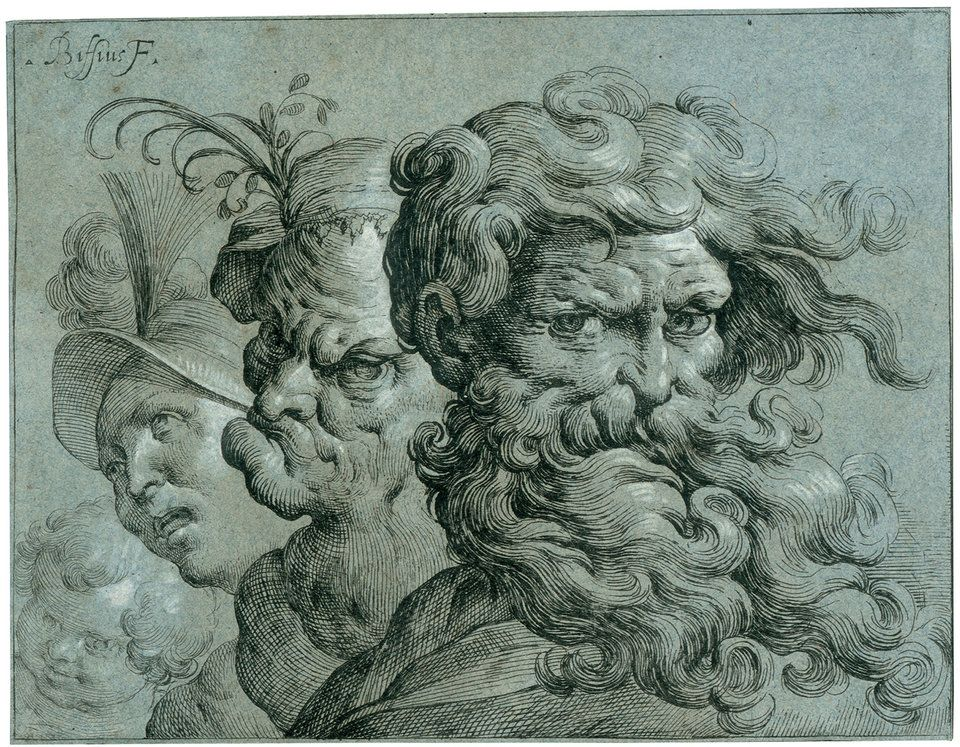
Four Character Heads
