= Portrait of Christine Boyer =

Painting by Antoine-Jean Gros

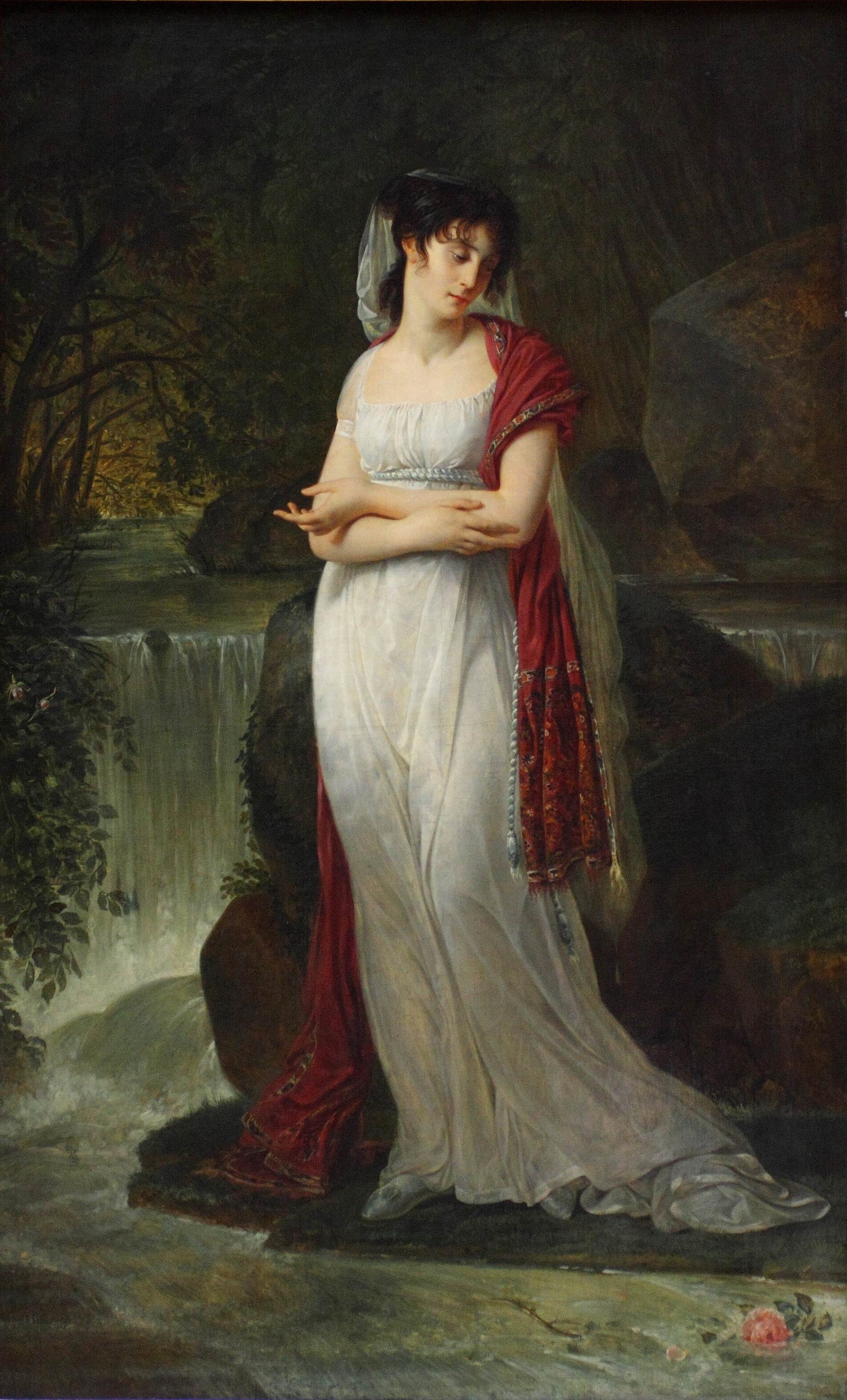
- Artist: Antoine-Jean Gros
- Year: 1800
- Type: Oil on canvas, portrait painting
- Dimensions: 214 cm × 134 cm (84 in × 53 in)
- Location: Louvre, Paris

Portrait of Christine Boyer is an 1800 oil-on-canvas portrait painting by the French artist Antoine-Jean Gros. It depicts Christine Boyer, the first wife of Lucien Bonaparte. Boyer was an innkeeper's daughter who married Lucien, the younger brother of the future Emperor of France Napoleon, and had four children with him. She died the year the painting was produced at the age of twenty eight. The portrait was commissioned by Lucien, probably posthumously. Today the work is in the collection of the Louvre in Paris, having been acquired in 1894.

== Bibliography ==
- Halliday, Anthony. Facing the Public: Portraiture in the Aftermath of the French Revolution. Manchester University Press, 2000.
- Lajer-Burcharth, Ewa. Necklines: The Art of Jacques-Louis David After the Terror. Yale University Press, 1999.
