= Pompeo Gabrielli =

Italian general and politician

Pompeo Gabrielli di Prossedi
- Born: 22 August 1780; Rome
- Died: 28 March 1861 (aged 80) Rome
- Allegiance: Papal States; First French Empire
- Branch: Cavalry
- Service years: (Papal States) 1798–1808 (First French Empire) 1808–1815 (Papal States) 1815–1848
- Rank: (First French Empire) Lieutenant Colonel (Papal States) Brigadier General
- Conflicts: Napoleonic Wars; Battle of Wagram (1809); Russian campaign (1812); Battle of Leipzig (1813); Battle of Waterloo (1815)

Pompeo Gabrielli (22 August 1780 – 28 March 1861) was an Italian general and politician, the first layman to be appointed Minister in a Papal States cabinet.

== Biography ==
Pompeo's father was Pietro Gabrielli, prince of Prossedi and his mother was Camilla Riario Sforza. In 1798 Pietro was charged by pope Pius VI to sign the surrender of the Church-State to the French troops of General Berthier, and later, during the annexation of Rome by the French empire (1808–1814) served as maire adjoint (deputy mayor) of the city. Pietro's brother (Pompeo's uncle) was Cardinal Giulio Gabrielli the Younger, who served as Pius VII's Secretary of State.

=== Early life and military career ===
Pompeo Gabrielli was born in Rome on 22 August 1780. After completing his studies at the Collegio Tolomei in Siena, in 1801 he joined the newly-constituted Noble Guard, and in 1805 was assigned to a cavalry regiment. In February 1808 he resisted the French occupation of Rome and was therefore arrested by decree of General Miollis. He soon became supportive of the Napoleonic regime, however, and shortly after was offered to join the Imperial Guard as a cavalry officer. He thus participated in the Napoleonic Wars and fought in Austria (Battle of Wagram), Russia (where he was presented with the Légion d'Honneur by the emperor), Germany (where he was wounded during the battle of Leipzig), and finally at Waterloo.

Back in Rome following Napoleon's defeat and the European Restoration, he joined again the Papal States' Army as a cavalry officer and was employed in police duties in the Papal Legations of Ferrara, Bologna and Romagna, where Carbonari were uprising. In 1825, with the rank of colonel of the Dragoons, he headed all the military forces deployed in the Legations but refrained from taking too severe measures against the insurgents, rather seeking pacification by diplomatic means. In 1832 he was promoted to general and assigned to administrative duties, and in 1841 he was appointed head of the Roman Civic Guard.

=== Political career ===
On 13 January 1848, amid the turmoil caused by the expected break out of the First Italian War of Independence, and as a consequence of Pius IX’s willingness to reform the institutions of the State, Pompeo Gabrielli was chosen as Minister of War by Giuseppe Bofondi, the newly-appointed Cardinal Secretary of State. It was the first time that a layman entered a Church-State cabinet, and his appointment was seen as an appeasement towards the more liberal sectors of Italian society. Among the factors contributing to his selection were the consideration that he had manifested "modern" views by serving under Napoleon in his youth, but had also shown capacity and loyalty to the Pope since the Restoration. He was confirmed in the short-lived second Bofondi cabinet thus serving until 10 March 1848.

With the proclamation of the Roman Republic in 1849 he retired from public life, but in 1850 welcomed the return of Pius IX to Rome and escorted him from the State border to the Quirinal Palace. Progressively disappointed by the conservative and repressive policies adopted by the Church State's government, he was nevertheless appointed Senator in 1851. His last years were dedicated to charity work. He bequeathed his estate to his nephew prince Placido Gabrielli, the only son of his brother Mario Gabrielli and Princess Charlotte Bonaparte.

He died in Rome on 28 March 1861.

== Works ==
- Regolamento concernente il servizio interno, la polizia e la disciplina della truppa pontificia a cavallo. Roma, 1817
- Ristretto dell’istruzione teorica sopra l’esercizio e la manovra della truppa a cavallo. Roma, 1830
- Istruzione cristiana ad uso degli individui del reggimnto de’ dragoni pontificii. Roma, 1830

== Decorations ==
- Grand Cross, Pontifical Equestrian Order of St. Gregory the Great
- Grand Cross, Order of Pius IX
- Knight First Class, Order of the Iron Crown (Austria)
- Officier, Legion of Honour
