= Charlotte Bonaparte Gabrielli =

French Napoleonic princess (1795–1865)

Princess Charlotte
- Portrait by Jean-Baptiste Wicar, 1815
- Born: 22 February 1795; Saint-Maximin-la-Sainte-Baume, France
- Died: 13 May 1865 (aged 70); Palazzo Gabrielli, Rome, Papal States
- Spouse: Don Mario Gabrielli, Prince of Prossedi (m. 1815; died 1841) Knight Settimio Centamori (m. 1842)
- Issue: Letizia Gabrielli; Cristina Gabrielli; Lavinia Gabrielli; Angelo Gabrielli; Camilla Gabrielli; Emilia Gabrielli; Placido Gabrielli; Francesca Gabrielli
- House: Bonaparte
- Father: Lucien Bonaparte
- Mother: Christine Boyer

Filistine Charlotte Bonaparte Gabrielli (born Filistine Charlotte Bonaparte; 22 February 1795 – 13 May 1865) was a French Napoleonic princess and the eldest daughter of Lucien Bonaparte and Christine Boyer. She became princess Gabrielli following her marriage to Mario Gabrielli, prince of Prossedi and Roccasecca, Duke of Pisterzo. In Italy, she was known as Carlotta.

== Biography ==
Filistine Charlotte Bonaparte was born on 22 February 1795 in Saint-Maximin-la-Sainte-Baume, the daughter of Lucien Bonaparte (1775–1840), later the first prince of Canino and Musignano, and his first wife Christine Boyer (1773–1800). She was a niece of the emperor Napoleon I. Her paternal grandmother, Letizia Ramolino (Madame Mère), nicknamed her "Lolotte." When she was six years of age and Christine-Egypta, her younger sister, was two, their mother died at Chamant, Plessis, of a pulmonary disease while pregnant with a third sibling. She spent her childhood in France and Spain and from 1804 onwards was educated by nuns in Italy.

When Napoleon's first marriage to Joséphine de Beauharnais was annulled, the possibility that he might marry Charlotte was suggested by her aunt Pauline Bonaparte, as this would have consolidated family power. Under pressure from Napoleon, who wished to arrange her marriage, she was sent to Paris stay with his mother, Madame Mère. Marriage arrangements to the Spanish prince Ferdinando of the Asturias (later Ferdinand VII of Spain) and the grand-duke of Würzburg (later Ferdinand III of Tuscany) were planned for her by Napoleon but eventually not concluded. Charlotte continuously wrote letters to her father which complained of the hypocritical French court and the ugliness of her female relatives. She even criticized Napoleon himself, and when these letters were intercepted by his secret police, she was sent home. As a consequence of the increasingly abrasive relationship between Lucien and Napoleon, Charlotte, her father, her stepmother Alexandrine de Bleschamp, sibling and half-siblings and household attempted to sail to the United States on 5 August 1810. They were captured by the British and forced to reside first in the Malta Protectorate and then in England until the fall of Napoleon in May 1814.

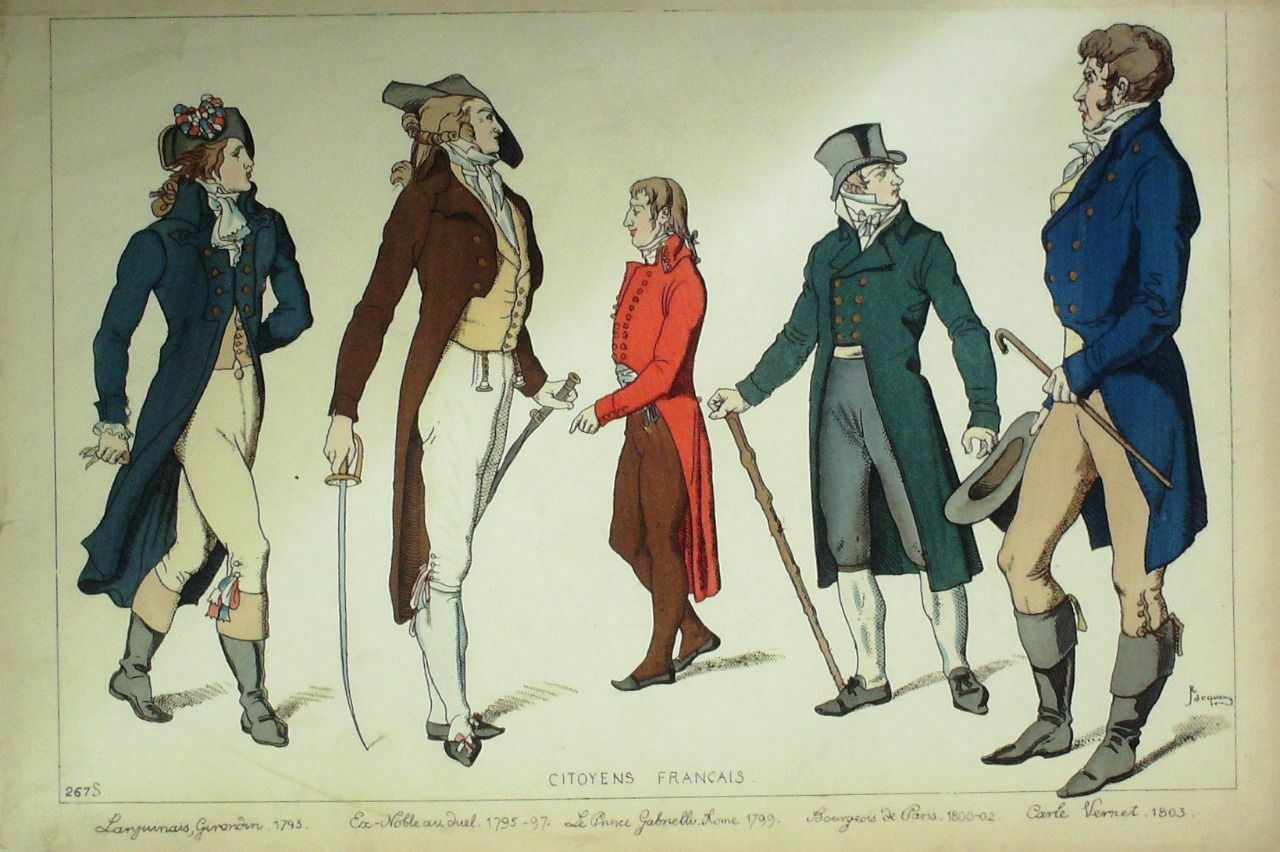
Citoyens français of the Revolutionary age. Mario Gabrielli, Charlotte's husband, depicted at the centre in 1799

During the restoration of her uncle Napoleon for a period known as the Hundred Days, Charlotte was granted the title of French Princess (22 March 1815) and the qualification of Imperial Highness. Charlotte was then married on 27 December 1815 in Rome to the Roman Prince Mario Gabrielli (Rome, 6 December 1773 – Rome, 17 September 1841), Prince of Prossedi. He was the scion of an old Italian Catholic family from Gubbio, the son of the Napoleonic deputy mayor of Rome and nephew of a former Cardinal Secretary of State. She thus became the Princess Gabrielli until his death in 1841.

An outspoken and sincere woman, the Italians referred to Princess Gabrielli as "a true Bonaparte". Even after the fall of Napoleon, she always remained loyal to her uncle's memory and had a particular affection for her paternal grandmother, Madame Mère, to whom she remained attached until her death at Palazzo Bonaparte-d'Aste, in the Roman Piazza Venezia, in 1836.

She was an avid book collector and the patroness of a literary and intellectual circle that regularly met at her husband's villa on the Janiculum from the years 1820 to 1840. The "Villa Gabrielli al Gianicolo" was one of the must-see stops of Grand Tour travellers because of the magnificent view of the city, and is currently the Roman headquarters of the Pontifical North American College.

Charlotte survived her husband as the Dowager Princess Gabrielli (1841–1865) and the following year she quietly remarried to her faithful admirer the Knight Settimio Centamori. With the rise of Emperor Napoleon III, Charlotte was again officially included in the Imperial family and recognized as Princess Bonaparte with the qualification of Highness (21 February 1853). Princess Gabrielli died on 6 May 1865, aged seventy, at the Palazzo Gabrielli in Rome.

== Marriage and children ==
On 27 December 1815, in Rome, Charlotte Bonaparte married Don Mario Gabrielli, Prince of Prossedi (Rome, 6 December 1773 – Rome, 17 September 1841), with whom she had eight children:

- Donna Letizia Gabrielli (Rome, 1817 – Rome, 1827); died young.
- Donna Cristina Gabrielli (Rome, 1821 – Rome, 1898); married in Rome in 1842 Antonio, Marquess Stefanoni (1819 – Rome, 1883) and left children.
- Donna Lavinia Gabrielli (Rome, 1822 – Ferrara, 1888); married in 1843 Ildefonso, Count Aventi (Ferrara, 1802 – Ferrara, 1857) and left children.
- Don Angelo Gabrielli (1824–1826); died in infancy.
- Donna Camilla Gabrielli (Rome, 1828 – Rome, 1829); died in infancy.
- Donna Emilia Gabrielli (Rome, 1830–1911); married in 1849 Giuseppe, Count Parisani (Camerino, 1823 – Camerino, 1887) and left children, including the painter Napoleone Parisani.
- Don Placido Gabrielli (Rome, 1832 – Rome, 1911); married at the Tuileries in 1856 his cousin princess Augusta Bonaparte (daughter of Charles Lucien Bonaparte and his wife, Zénaïde Bonaparte), without issue.
- Donna Francesca Gabrielli (Rome, 1837 – Rome, 1860); married in 1855 Cesare, Count Parisani (1828–1904) and left children.

After Don Mario Gabrielli's death, she married Knight Settimio Centamori (1812–1889) in 1842. The marriage was childless.

== Portraits ==
She was represented by the French painter Jean-Baptiste Wicar as a young peasant woman in a life-size portrait, today in the collections of the Museo Napoleonico in Rome. Another life-size portrait by Jean-Pierre Granger is at the Palace of Versailles.
