= Gabrieli =

Gabrieli may refer to:

== People ==
- Andrea Gabrieli (c.1532–1585), composer and organist at San Marco di Venezia
- Giovanni Gabrieli (c.1554–1612), composer and organist at San Marco di Venezia
- Chris Gabrieli (born 1960), American politician
- John Gabrieli, American neuroscientist
- Ugo Gabrieli (born 1989), Italian footballer

== Other uses ==
- Gabrieli (calligrapher) (10th century), Georgian calligrapher
- Gabrieli Quartet, a British string ensemble

== See also ==
- Gabrielli, a surname
