= Scapin the Schemer =

Three-act comedy by Molière

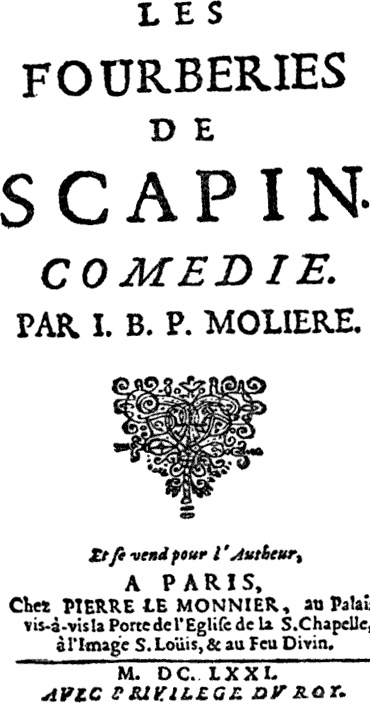
- Front page of Les Fourberies de Scapin
- Written by: Molière
- Characters: Scapin; Léandre; Octave; Géronte; Argante; Hyacinthe; Zerbinette; Silvestre; Carle; Nérine; Two porters
- Original language: French
- Genre: Comedy of intrigue
- Setting: Naples, Italy

Premiere
- Date premiered: May 24, 1671
- Place premiered: Théâtre du Palais-Royal, Paris

Scapin the Schemer (French: Les Fourberies de Scapin) is a three-act comedy of intrigue by the French playwright Molière. The title character Scapin is similar to the archetypical Scapino character. The play was first staged on 24 May 1671 in the theatre of the Palais-Royal in Paris.

The original play is in French but, like many of Molière's plays, it has been translated into many different languages. Adaptations in English include the 1676 The Cheats of Scapin by Thomas Otway and Scapino by Frank Dunlop and Jim Dale in 1974, which has also been further adapted by Noyce Burleson. Bill Irwin and Mark O'Donnell also adapted the play, as Scapin, in 1995.

In the play, Octave has secretly married without his father's permission. Léandre has also chosen his own prospective wife. When their respective fathers reveal their plans for arranged marriages for their boys, the sons want to keep their current spouses. The trickster Scapin intervenes on their behalf, convinced that nothing is impossible to achieve.

== Characters ==
Scapin
Léandre's valet and "fourbe" (a rough translation of "fourbe" is "a deceitful person")
Léandre
Son of Géronte and lover of Zerbinette
Octave
Son of Argante and lover of Hyacinthe
Géronte
Father of Léandre and of Hyacinthe
Argante
Father of Octave and of Zerbinette
Hyacinthe
Daughter of Géronte and lover of Octave
Zerbinette
Daughter of Argante and lover of Léandre, believed to be a gypsy girl
Silvestre
Octave's valet
Carle
"Fourbe"
Nérine
Hyacinthe's wet nurse
Two porters

== Plot ==
Scapin constantly lies and tricks people to get ahead. He is an arrogant, pompous man who acts as if nothing were impossible for him. However, he is also a diplomatic genius. He manages to play the other characters off of each other very easily, and yet manages to keep his overall goal — to help the young couples — in sight.

In their fathers' absence, Octave has secretly married Hyacinthe, while Léandre has secretly fallen in love with Zerbinette. But the fathers return from a trip with marriage plans for their respective sons. Scapin, after hearing many pleas for help, comes to their rescue. Thanks to many tricks and lies, Scapin manages to come up with enough money from the parents to make sure that the young couples get to stay married. But, no one knows who Hyacinthe and Zerbinette really are. It ends in the classic happy ending, and Scapin is even brought to the head of the table at the ending feast (even though he has to fake a fatal wound to make it happen ).

== Quotations ==
"À vous dire la vérité, il y a peu de choses qui me soient impossibles, quand je veux m'y mêler."

"To tell you the truth, there are few things that I find impossible, when I want to do them."

— Scapin, in Act 1, Scene 2

"Il vaut mieux encore d'être marié que mort."

"It's still better to be married than to be dead."

— Scapin, in Act 1, Scene 4

== See also ==
- Scapino
- Scapino (play) – English-language adaptation of Moliere's play

== Notes ==
- Garreau, Joseph E. 1984. "Molière". In McGraw-Hill Encyclopedia of World Drama. Ed. Stanley Hochman. New York: McGraw-Hill. ISBN 9780070791695. 397–418.
- Pavis, Patrice. 1998. Dictionary of the Theatre: Terms, Concepts, and Analysis. Trans. Christine Shantz. Toronto and Buffalo: U of Toronto P. ISBN 0-802-08163-0.

== Bibliography ==
- Comédie Française - Histoire de la Comédie Française (in French)
- Les Fourberies de Scapin (in French)
- Scapin, adapted by Bill Irwin and Mark O'Donnell
