= Cecciolo Gabrielli =

Cecciolo Gabrielli (c. 1375 – 26 June 1420) was an Italian nobleman, self-styled Duke of Gubbio (Duca di Gubbio or Duca d'Agobbio).

With the help of the condottieri Braccio da Montone, he tried to reconquer Gubbio which had been lost by his family in 1384, following the defeat of his great-uncle, the bishop Gabriello Gabrielli. However, he was captured by Guidantonio da Montefeltro at Serra Sant'Abbondio and hanged from the door of the Ponte Marmoreo (Marble Bridge) at Gubbio.

Before dying, Gabrielli shouted "Gubbio patria nostra" (Gubbio our fatherland), which eventually became one of the mottos of his family.
