= Luigi Gabrielli =

Italian soldier and military writer

Luigi Cante Gabrielli-Quercita (1790–1854) was an Italian soldier and military writer.

== Life ==
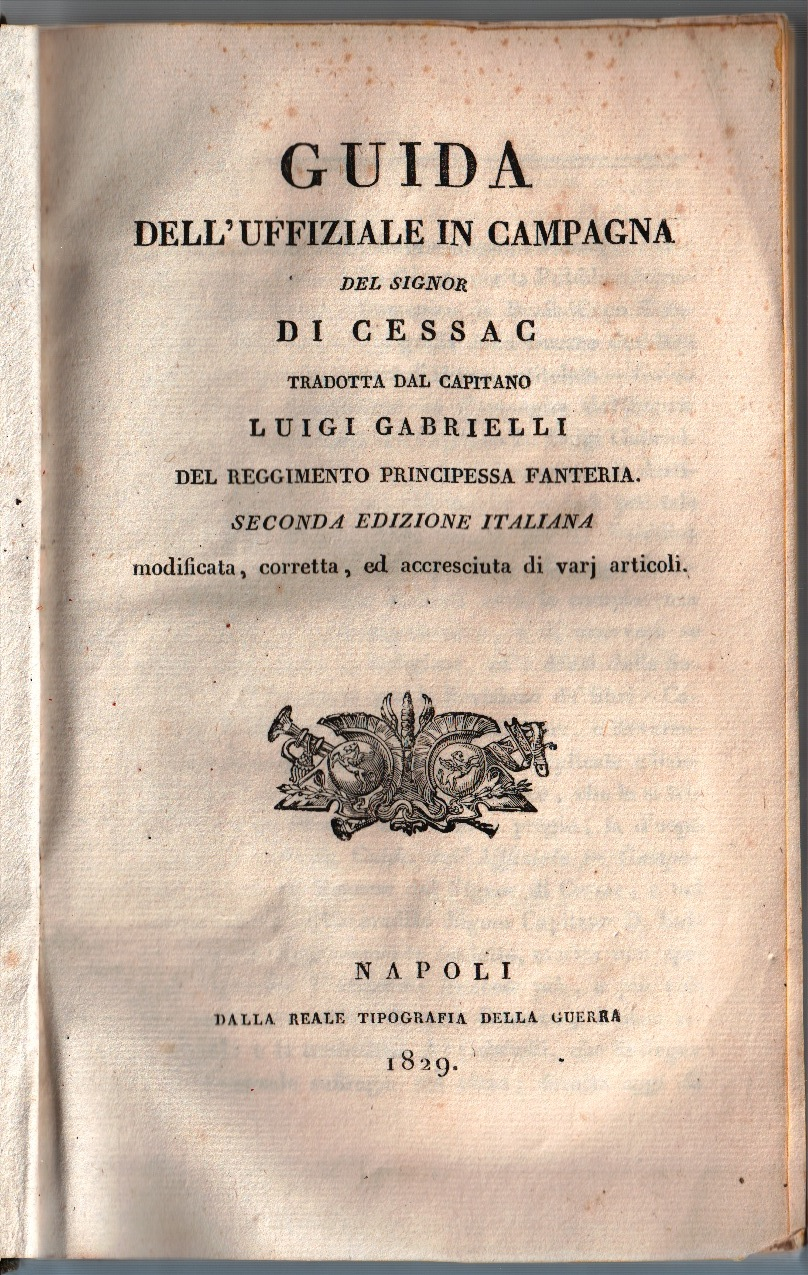
Frontispice of the second Italian edition of the Guida dell'Uffiziale in Campagna (1829)

Born in Naples to a family originally from Gubbio, Luigi was the son of Antonio Gabrielli, a nobleman of progressive ideas who in 1799 had supported the Parthenopean Republic against the Bourbon kings.

In 1809, at the age of 19, Luigi enlisted in the army and served under Joachim Murat, the newly appointed king of the Two Sicilies, until 1815, when Ferdinand I was restored. As king, Ferdinand acknowledged that some of the military reforms introduced by king Joachim were worth of being maintained, upon accession he decided not to disband the Army and offered many officers the possibility to remain and keep the same rank. That was also the case for Luigi Gabrielli, who accepted the king's offer.

Luigi's wishes to see a modernisation of the Neapolitan society were however frustrated by the increasingly conservative policy adopted by the government. Disillusioned and influenced by reformers such as Giuseppe Rosaroll, Luigi was introduced in philhellenic circles and briefly fought in Greece with the patriots pursuing the country's independence from the Ottoman Empire.

Following an injury, he decided to go back to Italy and joined again the Neapolitan army, with the hope of contributing to its modernization.

From the 1820s onwards, he dedicated himself to writing and translating military works and advocating for introducing into the army appropriate reforms. Among his works are the first Italian versions of the Guide des Officiers particuliers en Campagne by Jean-Gérard Lacuée de Cessac, the Essai sur l'infanterie legère ou Traité des petites Opérations de la Guerre by Guillaume Philibert Duhesme, and the Essai général de Tactique by Jacques-Antoine-Hippolyte de Guibert.

Luigi Gabrielli also wrote poems, most of which were inspired by political or social events. He died in Palermo on 29 August 1854, while the Sicilian capital was being ravaged by a cholera outbreak. He had reached the rank of colonel.

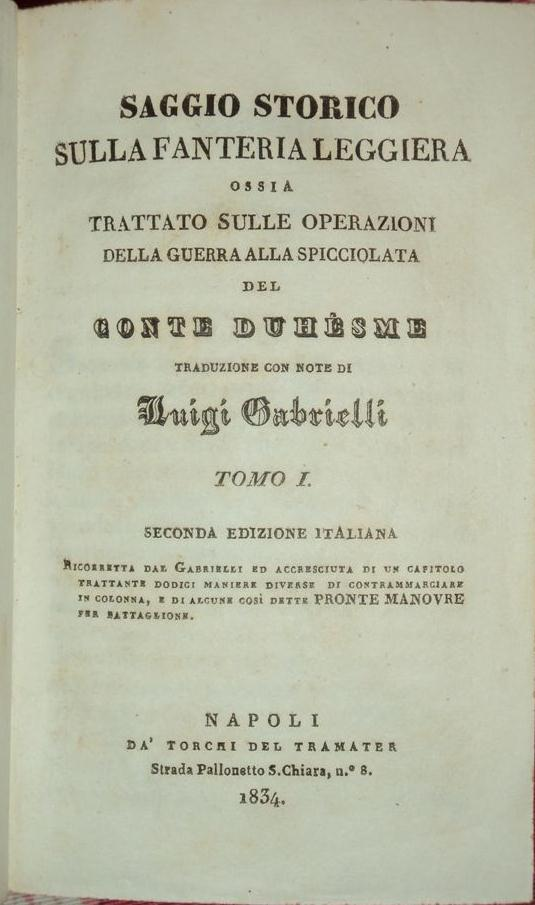
Frontispice of the second Italian edition of the Saggio storico sulla fanteria leggiera (1834)

== Works ==
=== Military essays ===
- Guida dell'uffiziale in campagna del conte di Cessac, con modificazioni, correzioni ed aggiunte del capitano Luigi Gabrielli (Naples, 1822 et 1829)
- Saggio storico sulla fanteria leggiera del conte Duhesme, ossia trattato sulle operazioni di guerra alla spicciolata, tradotto dal francese e annotato per Luigi Gabrielli (Naples, 1823 et 1834); first edition dedicated to General Sir Richard Church
- Saggio generale di tattica del conte di Guibert. Prima versione italiana (Naples, 1832)
- Capitolo addizionale al Saggio storico del Duhesme, contenente alcune così dette pronte manovre per battaglione e dodici maniere diverse di contramarciare (Naples, 1834)
- Officio delle guide e delle cariche militari nelle evoluzioni, recato dalla Regia Ordinanza del 1833 in quadri sinottici (Messine, 1836)

=== Poems ===
- La Felice Italia. Ode composta in occasione del proclama di Re Gioacchino dato in Rimini il 30 marzo 1815
- Alla Patria. Sonetto del capitano Luigi Gabrielli
- Rime in dialetto napoletano sulla Costituzione del 1820
- Sull'indipendenza della Grecia proclamata in Epidauro il 1 Gennajo 1822. Canzone in rima per Luigi Gabrielli filelleno

=== Tragedies ===
- Bianca da Salerno. Tragedia di Luigi Gabrielli. Stabilimento tipografico di Francesco Lao (Palermo, 1854)

== Bibliography ==
- Mariano d'Ayala. Bibliografia militare italiana antica e moderna. Stamperia Reale (Torino, 1854)
