= Vismara =

Vismara is an Italian surname. Notable people with the surname include:

- Clement Vismara (1897–1988), Italian priest and missionary
- Federico Vismara (born 1983), Argentine footballer
- Giorgio Vismara (born 1965), Italian judoka
- Karina Vismara (1990–2022), Argentine singer
- Lorenzo Vismara (born 1975), Italian swimmer
