= Francesco Gabrielli =

Italian actor

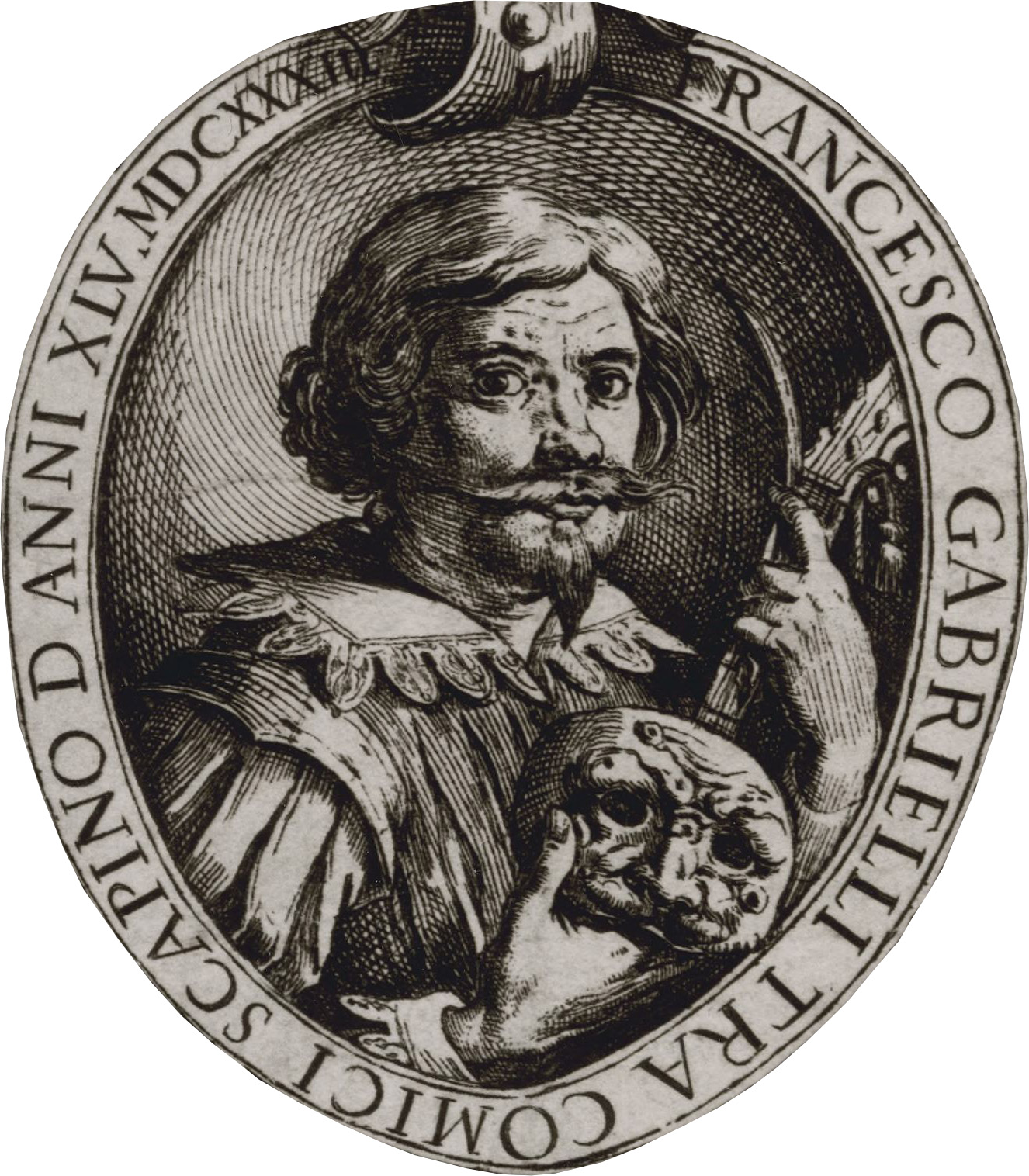
Francesco Gabrielli in 1633, detail from an engraving by Carlo Biffi

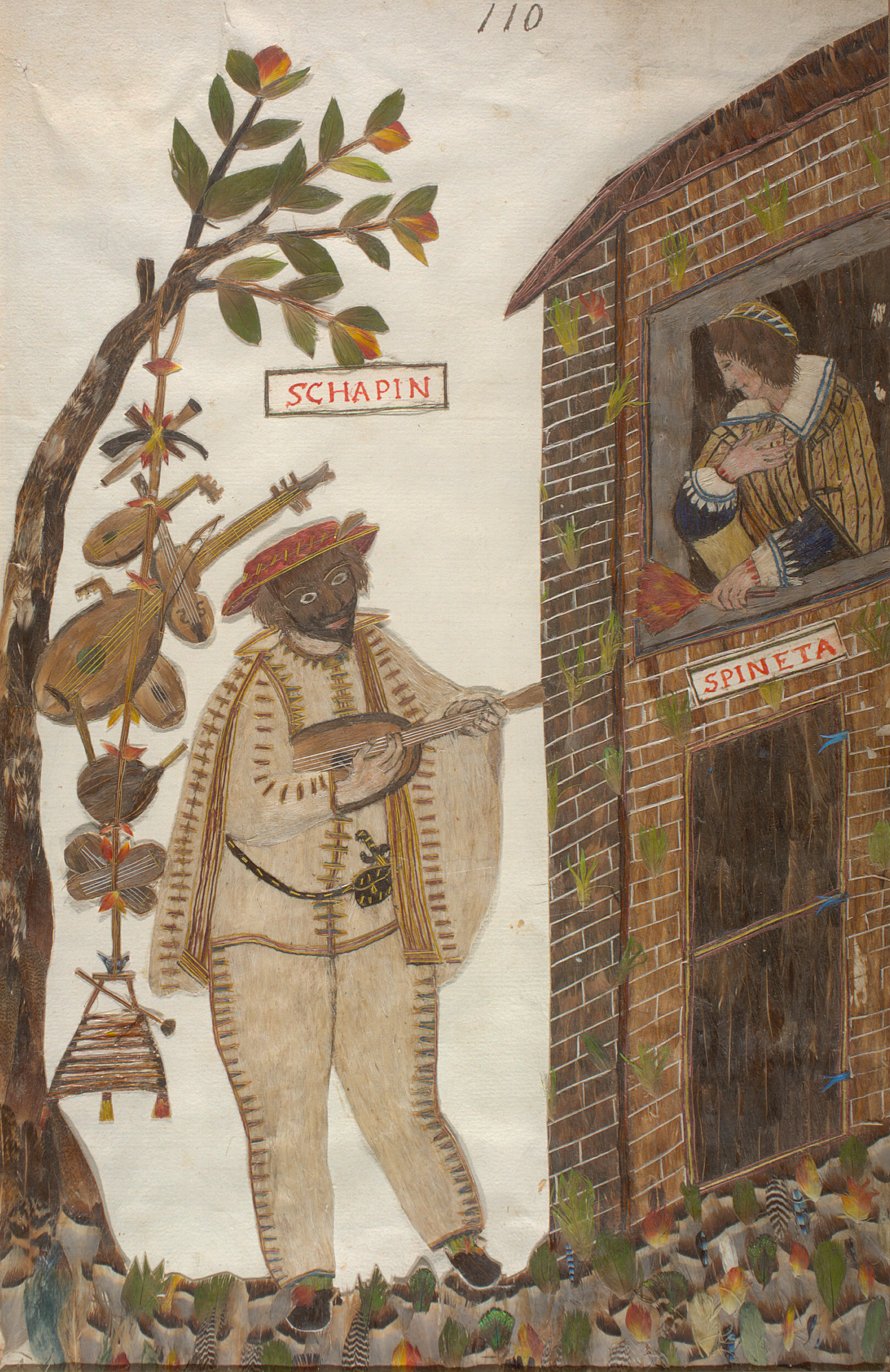
Folio 110 from the McGill Feather Book depicts a scene from a comedy by Nicolò Barbieri showing Spineta serenaded by the masked Schapin (Scapino). The large number of instruments hanging from the tree suggest the player is Francesco Gabrielli with his wife Spinetta.

Francesco Gabrielli (1588–1636) was an Italian actor of the commedia dell'arte. He was particularly famous as a virtuoso musician, who was an accomplished player of a dozen musical instruments. He is sometimes credited with the creation of Scapino, a musical zanni (servant) role, which he may actually have taken from Niccolò Barbieri. Gabrielli first appears as a member of the troupe of the Accesi in 1612, is later recorded as a member of the Confidenti, and in 1624 was with the Fedeli in Paris (under the direction of Giovan Battista Andreini), before rejoining the Accesi.

In 1627 Gabrielli learned that the Duke of Mantua was seeking a company of actors and wrote a letter from Ferrara to Antonio Costantini, the Duke's assistant, offering to bring his family and fellow players to perform in Mantua. The letter reveals much concerning the difficulties of forming a balanced ensemble and the professional rivalries among actors, both within and between troupes.

Francesco Gabrielli was the son of the well known commedia dell'arte actor Giovanni Gabrielli (known as Sivello). Francesco married Spinetta Locatelli, an actress who appeared with him, and they had several children who became actors, including Giulia (seen in Paris as Diana in 1645). It is uncertain whether Girolamo Gabrielli (a famous Pantalone) and Ippolita Gabrielli (a troupe manager in 1663) were his children.

== Bibliography ==
- Bergquist, Stephen A. (2014). "Scapino: A Portrait of Francesco Gabrielli", Music in Art: International Journal for Music Iconography, vol. 39, nos. 1–2, pp. 98–101. ISSN 1522-7464.
- Hartnoll, Phyllis, editor (1983). The Oxford Companion to the Theatre (fourth edition). Oxford: Oxford University Press. ISBN 9780192115461.
- Katritzky, M. A. (2006). The Art of Commedia: A Study in the Commedia dell'Arte 1560-1620 with Special Reference to the Visual Records. Amsterdam; New York: Rodopi. ISBN 9789042017986.
- Lea, Kathleen Marguerite (1934; reissued 1962). Italian popular comedy: a study in the Commedia dell'Arte, 1560-1620, with special reference to the English stage, 2 volumes, paged continuously. Oxford: Clarendon Press (1934), OCLC 1879518. New York: Russell & Russell (1962), OCLC 1134107.
- Rasi, Luigi (1897–1905). I Comici Italiani: Biografia, bibliografia, iconografia, 3 volumes. Florence: Fratelli Boca. Catalog record at HathiTrust.
- Richards, Kenneth; Richards, Laura (1990). The Commedia Dell'Arte: A Documentary History. Oxford: Basil Blackwell. ISBN 9780631195900.
- Senelick, Laurence (1995). "Gabrielli family", p. 407 in The Cambridge Guide to the Theatre, new edition, edited by Martin Banham. Cambridge: Cambridge University Press. ISBN 9780521434379.
