= Giovanni Maria Gabrielli =

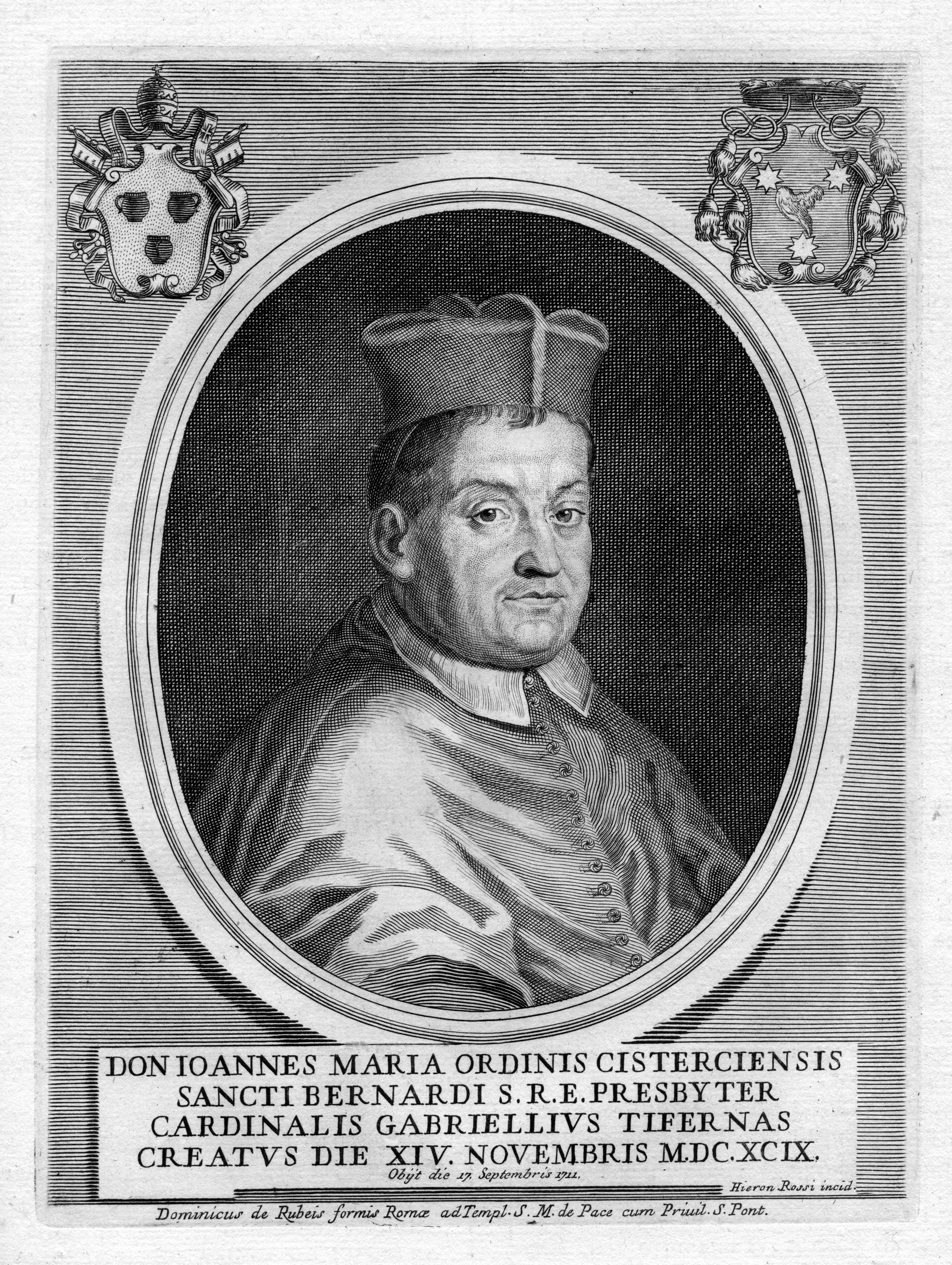
A picture of Giovanni Maria Gabrielli

Giovanni Maria Gabrielli (10 January 1654 – 17 September 1711) was a cardinal in the Italian Catholic Church.

== Biography ==
He was born in Città di Castello, in the Papal States, to an impoverished branch of an old and influential family from nearby Gubbio.

He moved at a young age to Rome, where he entered the Cistercian Order in the monastery of Santa Pudenziana and became a monk.

He started an academic career and taught philosophy and theology in a number of Cistercian houses of study for twenty years, in Italy, France and Spain. He was widely considered an eminent theologian and received by Pope Innocent XI (1676–1689) several offers of promotion to the episcopate, which he all declined. He rather chose to pursue Holy Inquisition offices and was assigned the leadership of many cases. In 1690, he was appointed Abbot of the monastery of San Bernardo alle Terme in Rome by Alexander VIII (1689–1691), and in 1699, Abbot general of the Cistercians by Innocent XII.

== Career with Catholic Church ==
During the reign of Innocent XII (1691–1700), Giovanni Maria Gabrielli's Curial career further progressed, and he served as Qualificator of the Holy Office and Prefect of Studies of the Urbanian College of Propaganda Fide in Rome. This period saw his most famous Inquisition case, against François Fénelon, whose work Explication des Maximes des Saints had been accused of being sympathetic to Quietism. Amidst the turmoil of what was regarded as a political intrigue rather than a theological case, cardinal Gabrielli staunchly defended Fénelon's viewpoints and established with him an epistolar friendship that lasted until his death. Recalling his ancestor Cante de' Gabrielli's infamous actions, it was said of him that "while one Gabrielli has condemned Dante and Petrarch, another one has defended Fénelon".

The Pope, who also privately supported Fénelon's opinion, held Gabrielli in great esteem and created him cardinal priest in the consistory of 14 November 1699; in a letter to the Abbé de Chanterac, Fénelon's agent in Rome, Gabrielli acknowledged that this appointment was, in fact, largely due to his role in the affaire des Maximes. A few months later, on 3 February 1700, he received the red hat and the title of S. Pudenziana, the church annexed to the monastery where he had studied in his youth. A few months later, the Pope died and the newly elected cardinal participated in the conclave which elected Pope Clement XI. From 1709 to 1710, he held the largely honorific title of Camerlengo of the Sacred College of Cardinals.

As Abbot General of the Cistercians, he chose the monastery of San Sebastiano fuori le mura, near Rome, as his residence. He restored the complex and built a new library there. A rose-grower and breeder, he designed and laid out a formal Italianate garden, of which only fragments survive today.

== Death ==
He died on 17 September 1711, at the Villa Farnese at Caprarola, near Viterbo. According to his will, his corpse was buried in the church of San Bernardo alle Terme, his internal organs in that of Santa Pudenziana and his heart in the beloved basilica of San Sebastiano fuori le mura. Three tombstones were erected in each of the churches and a marble bust was placed in San Sebastiano, to whose monks he had bequeathed his estate.
