= Giovanni Gabrielli (actor) =

Italian actor

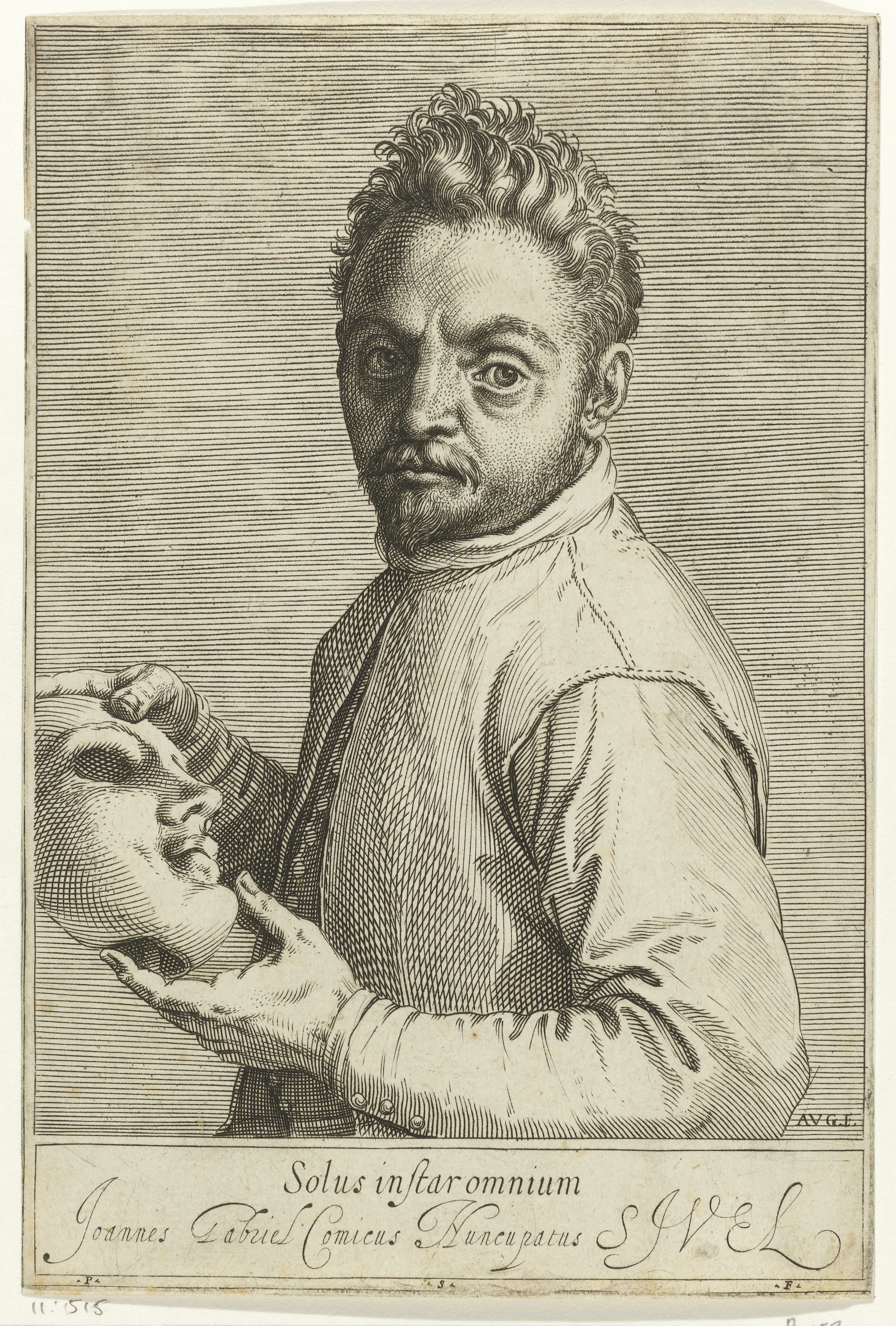
Portrait of Giovanni Gabrielli, c. 1599, engraved by Agostino Carracci

Giovanni Gabrielli (died between 1603 and 1611) was an Italian actor of the commedia dell'arte, who performed under the name Sivello. He has sometimes been confused with the Venetian composer Giovanni Gabrieli.

== Biography ==
Gabrielli was particularly famous for portraying several characters talking together in different languages. The 18th-century historian Francesco Saverio Quadrio relates that Gabrielli was able to impersonate women with his voice only, without the benefit of a costume change. His portrait was engraved by Agostino Carracci.

His son Francesco Gabrielli was also a well known actor.

== Publications ==
Two works of Gabrielli were published in Bologna in the early 17th century:

- Villanelle Nuove Composte per Giovanni Gabrielli detto il Sivello (Bologna, 1601)
- Il Studio, Comedia Nova, Composta per Giovanni Gabrielli da Modona, detto il Sivello (Bologna, 1602)

== Bibliography ==
- Askew, Pamela (1978). "Fetti's 'Portrait of an Actor' Reconsidered", The Burlington Magazine, vol. 120, no. 899 (February 1978), pp. 59–65.
- Banham, Martin, editor (1995). The Cambridge Guide to the Theatre (new edition). Cambridge: Cambridge University Press. ISBN 9780521434379.
- Mahon, Denis (1947; reprint 1971). Studies in Seicento Art and Theory. London: Warburg Institute, University of London (1947). OCLC 1966882. Westport, Connecticut: Greenwood (1971). ISBN 9780837147437.
- Quadrio, Francesco Saverio (1744). Della storia e della ragione di ogni poesia, vol. 3, part 2. Milan: Francesco Agnelli. Copy at the Internet Archive.
- Rasi, Luigi (1897–1905). I Comici Italiani: Biografia, bibliografia, iconografia, 3 volumes. Florence: Fratelli Boca. Catalog record at HathiTrust.
- Megale, Teresa (1998). "GABRIELLI, Giovanni, detto Sivello". Dizionario Biografico degli Italiani (in Italian). Vol. 51: Gabbiani–Gamba. Rome: Istituto dell'Enciclopedia Italiana. ISBN 978-88-12-00032-6.
