= Chamant =

- Commune
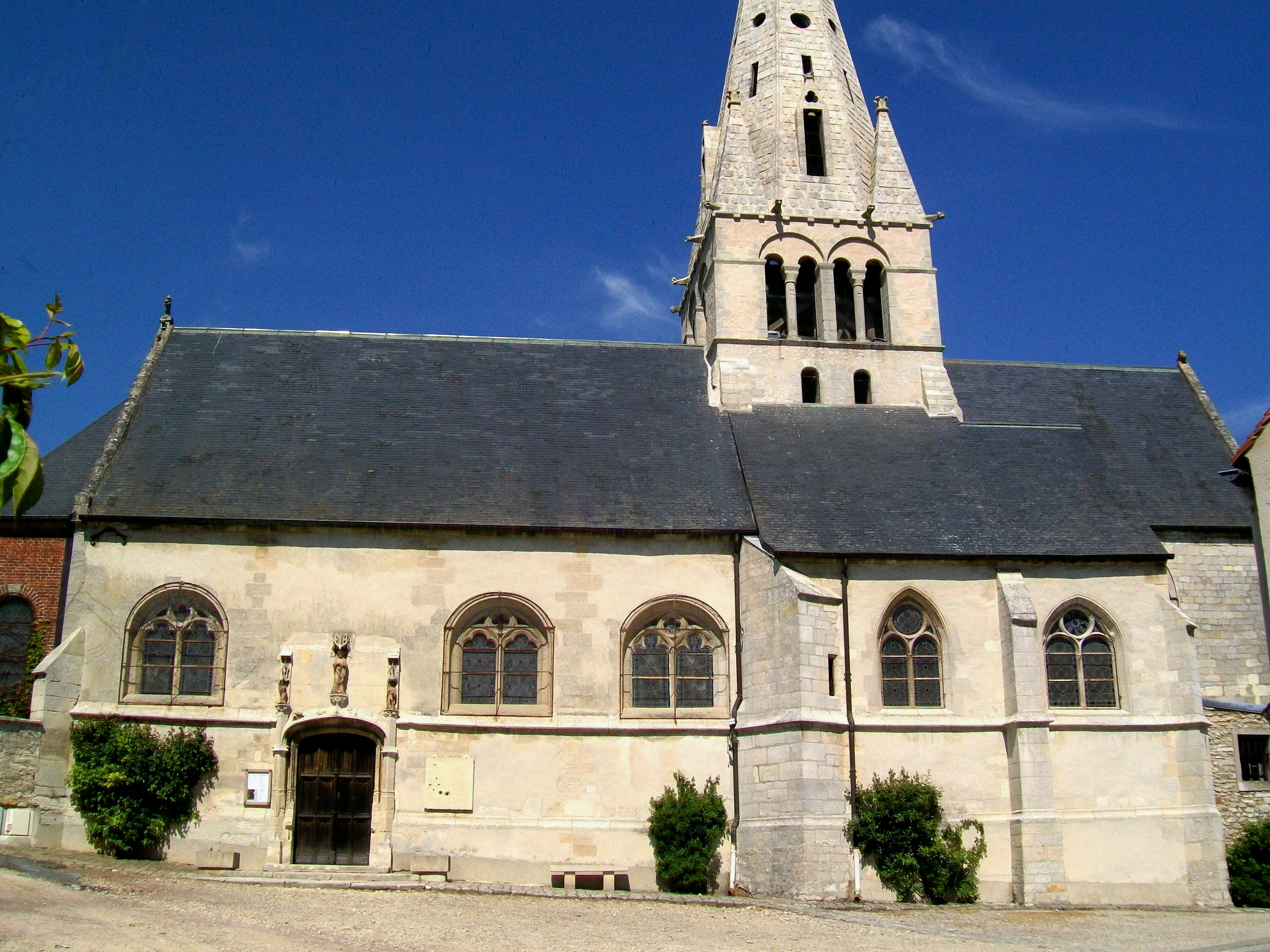
- The church in Chamant
- Location of Chamant
- Location within France Location within Hauts-de-France
- Coordinates: 49°13′14″N 2°36′42″E
- Country: France
- Region: Hauts-de-France
- Department: Oise
- Arrondissement: Senlis
- Canton: Senlis

Government
  - Mayor (2020–2026): Philippe Charrier
- Area^{1}: 12 km^{2} (4.6 sq mi)
- Elevation: 84 m (276 ft)
- Highest elevation: 117 m (384 ft)
- Lowest elevation: 57 m (187 ft)
- Population (2023): 1,043
  - Density: 87/km^{2} (230/sq mi)
- Time zone: UTC+01:00 (CET)
  - Summer (DST): UTC+02:00 (CEST)
- INSEE/Postal code: 60138 /60300
- ^{1} French Land Register data, which excludes lakes, ponds, glaciers > 1 km^{2} (0.386 sq mi or 247 acres) and river estuaries.

Chamant (French pronunciation: [ʃamɑ̃]) is a commune in the Oise department in northern France.

It is situated about 50 km to the north of Paris, and just 2 km to the northeast of Senlis.

== Literature ==
The town figured in the antisemitic novel The Jew of Chamant, published in 1898 by George H. D. Gossip under the pseudonym "Ivan Trepoff".

== See also ==
- Communes of the Oise department
