= Cante dei Gabrielli =

Italian nobleman and condottiero

Cante de' Gabrielli da Gubbio
- Lord of Gubbio, Podestà of Florence
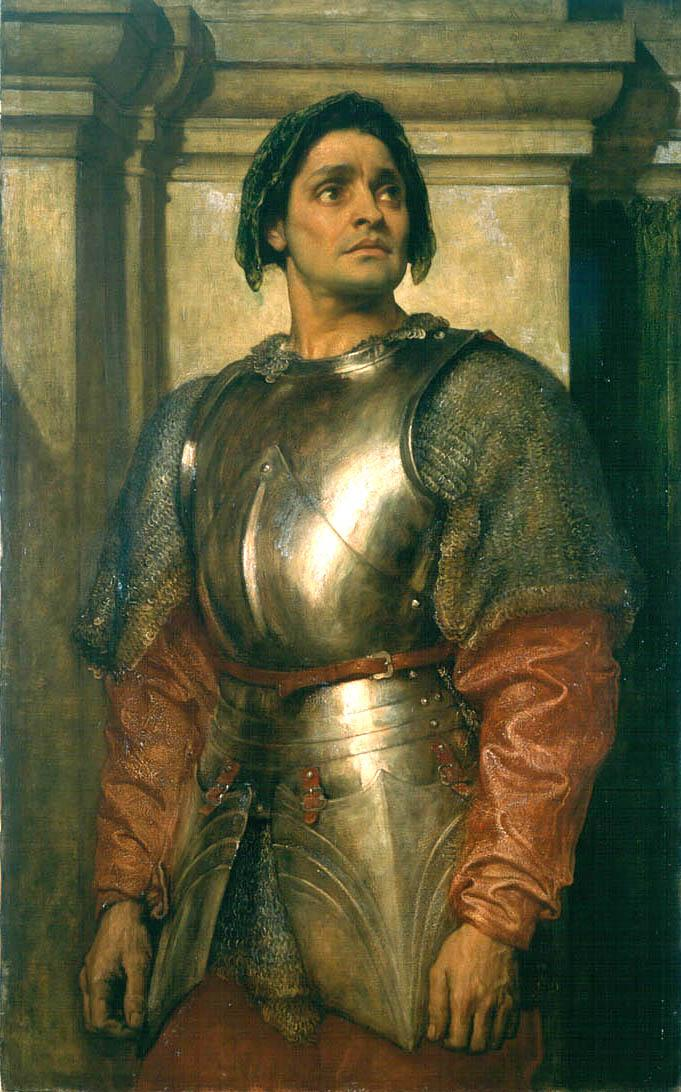
- Passionate about Dante's history, Lord Leighton was inspired by the figure of Cante Gabrielli for his Condottiere (1871-1872).
- Born: 1260; Gubbio, Papal States
- Died: 1335 (aged 74–75); Gubbio, Papal States
- Noble family: Gabrielli di Gubbio

Cante dei Gabrielli di Gubbio (c. 1260 – c. 1335) was an Italian nobleman and condottiero.

== Biography ==
Cante was born in Gubbio to a powerful Guelph feudal family. He held several high offices as Podestà in a number of cities in Tuscany and Umbria (Florence, Pistoia, Siena, Lucca, Orvieto) and was lord of Gubbio, Cantiano and other castles. In 1317 he was appointed by Pope John XXII as Commander-in-Chief of the Church's army, at the head of which he defeated the Ghibellines at Assisi and Urbino, thus re-establishing the Pope's supremacy in central Italy.

He is mostly famous for having exiled from Florence Dante Alighieri, the famous poet, while serving as Podestà of that city (1301–1302). Dante took vengeance on him by giving Cante's disguised name to Rubicante, one of the Malebranche demons the poet encounters in the bolgia of barratry, as described in his masterwork the Divine Comedy (Inf. XXI vv. 118–123).

Over the centuries, literati have recognized that Dante's condemnation to exile was the necessary catalyst for what is today regarded as the pre-eminent work in Italian literature, the most important poem of the Middle Ages, and one of the greatest works of world literature. Along this line, in 1874 Giosuè Carducci addressed a sonnet to Cante de' Gabrielli, acknowledging his role as the man responsible for Dante's inspiration (A Messer Cante Gabrielli da Gubbio, Podestà di Firenze nel MCCCI).

In the domain of visual arts, Frederic Leighton was reportedly inspired by Cante dei Gabrielli's life when he painted his Condottiere (1871–1872), today at the Birmingham Museum and Art Gallery.

== See also ==
- Palazzo di Cante dei Gabrielli at Gubbio
