= Gabrielli family =

Italian noble family

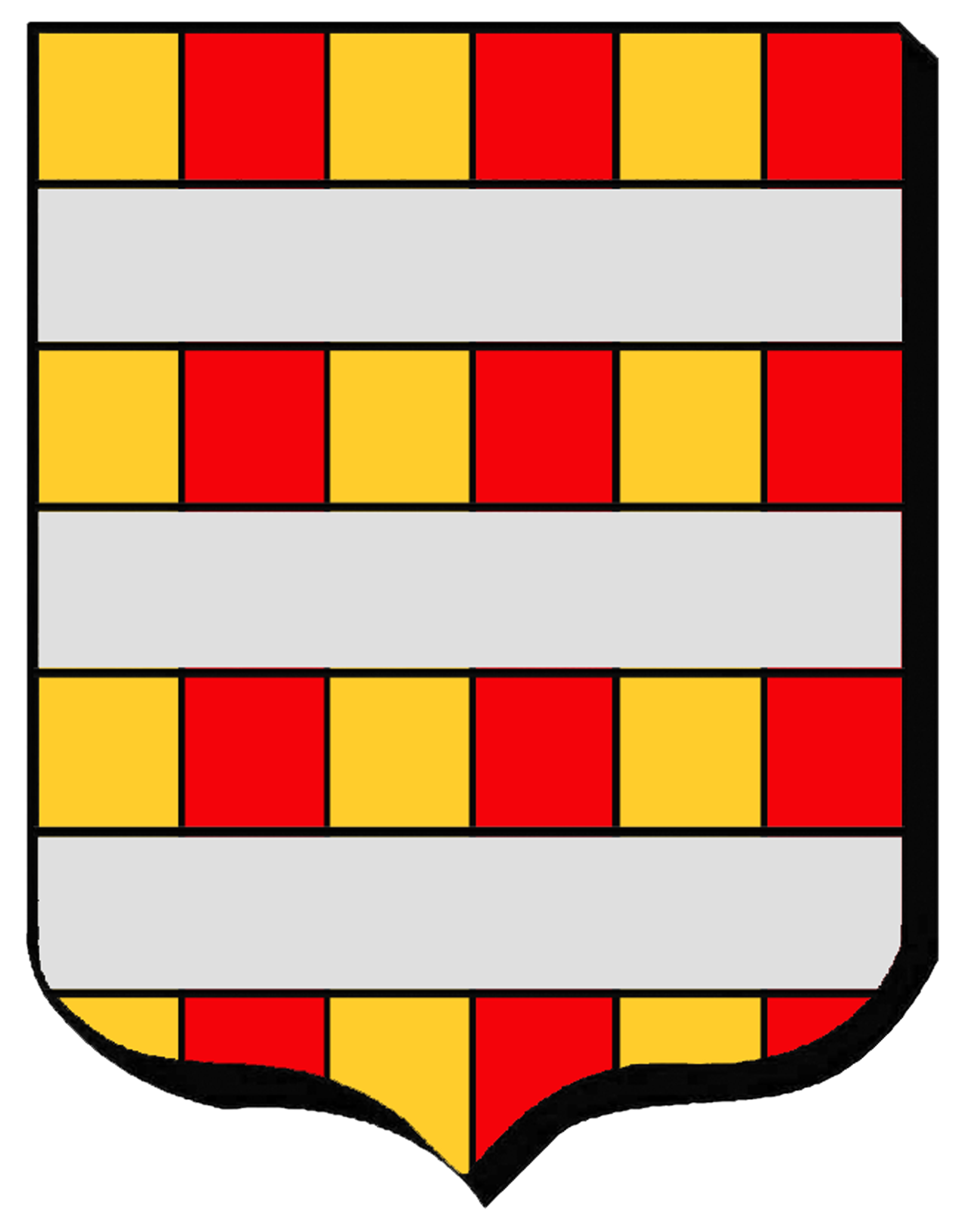
Original coat of arms, still in use by the comital branches of the Gabrielli family

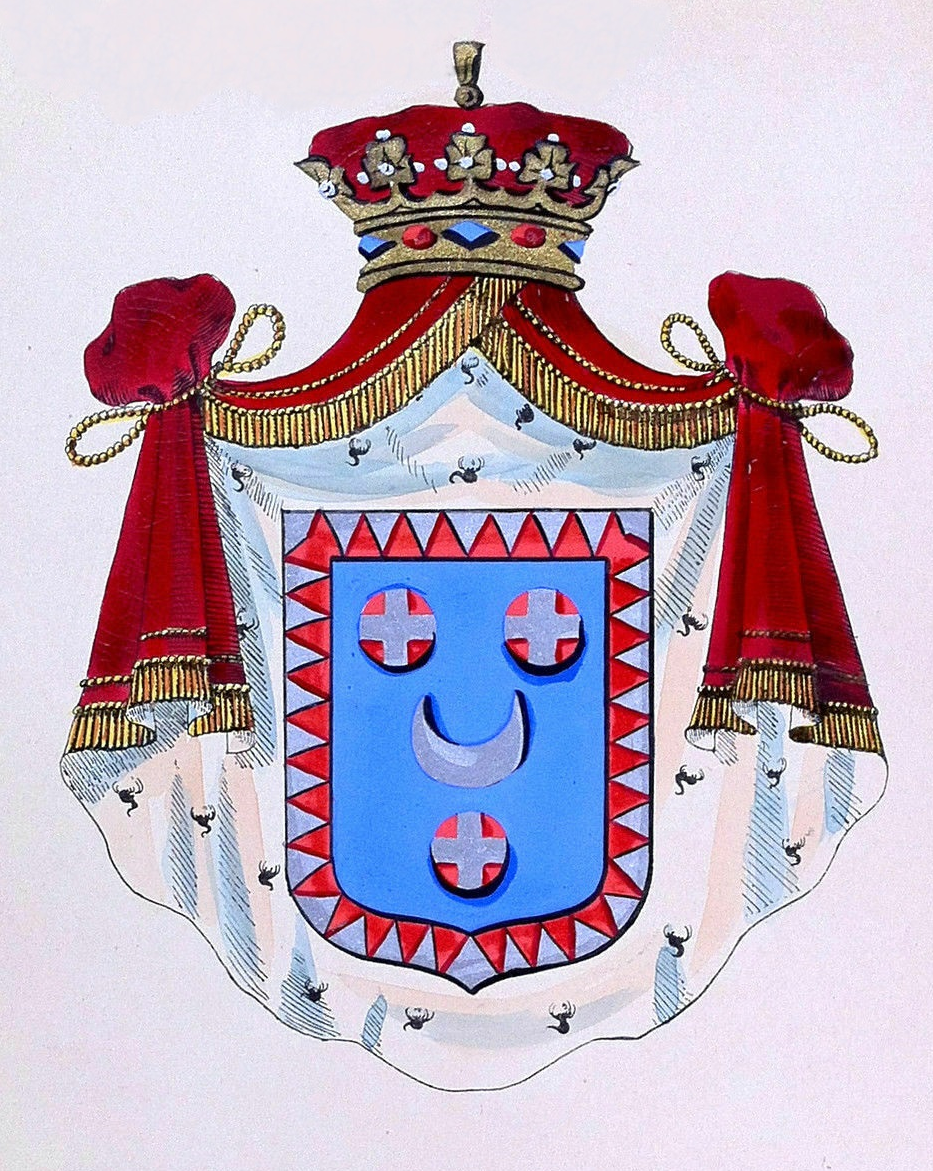
Coat of arms adopted by the princely branches (princes of Prossedi, Roccasecca and Pisterzo)

The House of Gabrielli (sometimes known as "Gabrielli di Gubbio") is the name of an old and influential feudal Italian noble family from Gubbio, a town in Umbria.

== History ==
Some historians trace their origins back to the Roman age and claim they descend from the emperor Caracalla, however the first historical documents mentioning the family appear in the 10th century only when Cante Gabrielli was awarded by Pope Stephen VII (according to some genealogists a family member himself), a few castles in central Italy and especially the castle at Luceoli which was renamed Cantiano (i.e. belonging to Cante) after him.

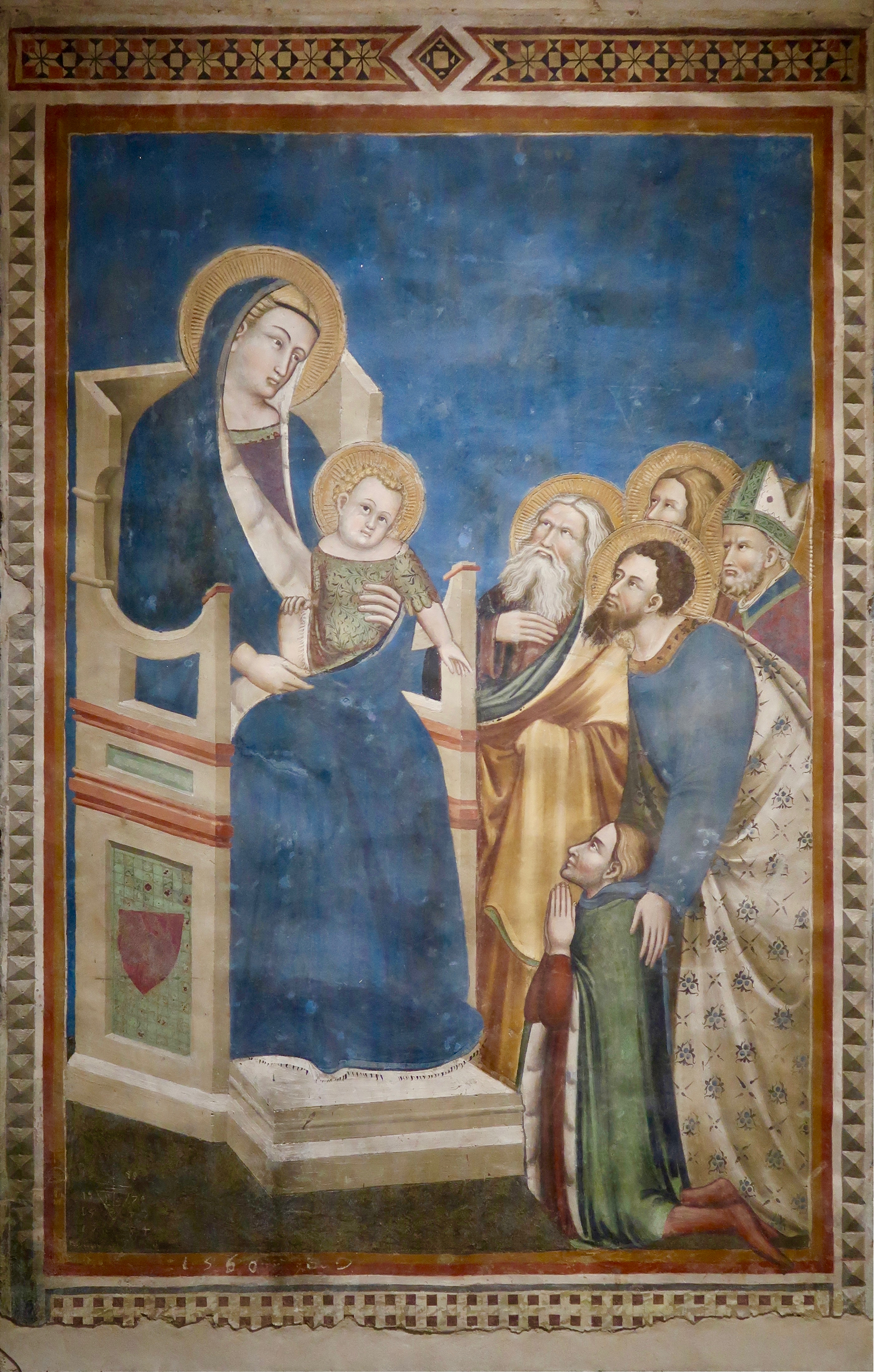
The Gabrielli Madonna, by Mello da Gubbio, ca. 1350, Pinacoteca Civica, Gubbio. Giovanni Gabrielli, lord of Gubbio, is introduced to the Blessed Virgin Mary by a group of Saints.

== Notable members ==
- Forte Gabrielli was a hermit in the mountains around Gubbio, and later on joined the Benedictines at Fonte Avellana. He died on 9 May 1040 and was beatified by Pope Benedict XIV on 17 March 1756. His body is still exposed in the Cathedral of Gubbio.
- Saint Rodolfo Gabrielli was born in 1034; in 1051 he bequeathed his castle at Camporeggiano to Saint Peter Damian and became a Benedictine monk at the Monastery of Fonte Avellana. He was appointed bishop of Gubbio in 1061 and died on 17 October 1064. He was later canonized. Saint Peter Damian described Rodolfo's life in his Vita Sancti Rodulphi Episcopi Eugubini (Life of St Rudolph Bishop of Gubbio).
- His brother Pietro Gabrielli was also beatified.
- Girolamo Gabrielli was the leader of 100 knights during the First Crusade. According to an undocumented tradition, he was the first Crusader to enter the Holy Sepulchre when Jerusalem was seized (1099).
- Aldo (or Addo) Gabrielli was bishop of Piacenza from 1095 to 1121.
- Ermanno Gabrielli was consul et rector comunis et civitatis Eugubii in 1181.
- Cante Gabrielli was Commander in Chief of the Guelph League in Central Italy and Podestà (Lord-Mayor) of Florence. He condemned Dante Alighieri, the famous poet, for barratry, and exiled him from Florence. Dante took vengeance on Cante by giving the allusive name of Rubicante to the furious devil that Dante himself encounters in the Divine Comedy, in the bolgia of barratry (cantos XXI and XXII). Giosuè Carducci, the famous Italian poet and Nobel Prize winner in 1906, also dedicated a sonnet to Cante Gabrielli.
- Ubaldo Gabrielli was bishop of Treviso from 1323 to 1336.

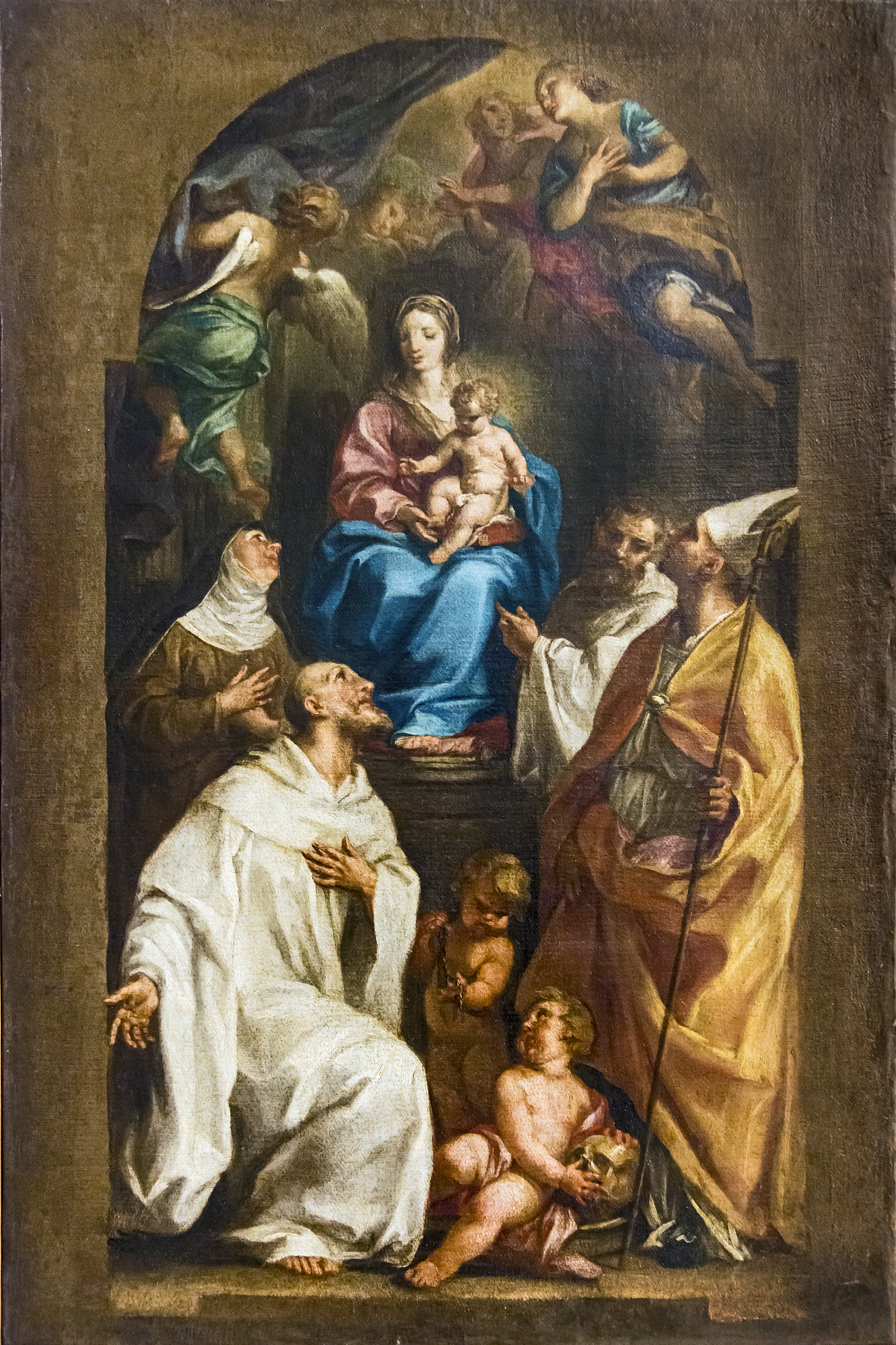
Madonna enthroned with Child and Saints of the Gabrielli di Gubbio family, by Pompeo Batoni, 1732, San Gregorio Magno al Celio, Rome

- Blessed Castora Gabrielli joined the Franciscan order as a tertiary. She died on 14 June 1391 and was later beatified.
- Giovanni Gabrielli, count of Borgovalle was lord of Gubbio from 1350 to 1354.
- Paolo Gabrielli was bishop of Lucca from 1374 to 1380. He died in Perugia and was buried in the cathedral of that city.
- Gabriello Gabrielli was lord and bishop of Gubbio from 1381 to 1384.
- Cecciolo Gabrielli, self-styled Duca di Gubbio, tried without success to reconquer the city.
- Gabriele de' Gabrielli (1445-1511), called Il Cardinal d'Urbino (the Cardinal of Urbino), was bishop of Urbino from 1504 until his death. He was created Cardinal in 1505, and died in the Apostolic Palace in Rome.
- Francesco Gabrielli, count of Baccaresca, served as General of Italian troops during the Portugal war and died at the battle of Alcazarquivir in 1578.
- Bartolomeo Gabrielli (1566-1633), count of Baccaresca, served as Captain General of the Comtat Venaissin.
- Giulio Gabrielli the Elder (1604-1677) was created Cardinal in 1641.
- Domenico Gabrielli (1651-1690) composer and virtuoso violoncello player.
- Giovanni Maria Gabrielli (1654-1711) was created Cardinal in 1699.
- Giulio Gabrielli the Younger (1746-1822) served as Cardinal Secretary of State from 26 March 1808 to 25 July 1814.
- Pompeo Gabrielli (1780-1861) was Minister of War in 1848, the first layman to sit in the Pontifical States' Government ever.
- Luigi Gabrielli (1790-1854) was a soldier and military writer.
- Rodolfo Gabrielli di Montevecchio (1802-1855), considered a hero of the Italian Risorgimento, fought in the First Independence War, distinguishing himself at Santa Lucia (1848) and Sforzesca (1849), where he commanded the Piemonte Reale Cavalleria regiment. Deployed in Crimea as a General of the Piedmont-Sardinia army, he was mortally wounded at Cernaia on 16 August 1855 and died two months later at the Balaclava hospital.
- Count Nicolò Gabrielli (1814-1891) was a well-known musician at the court of the French Emperor Napoleon III.
- Placido Gabrielli, Prince of Prossedi and Roccasecca, Duke of Pisterzo, was the son of Charlotte Bonaparte Gabrielli and the husband of Augusta Bonaparte Gabrielli. Between 1880 and 1885 he served as the first president of the Banco di Roma.

Moving out of Gubbio, the family divided over the centuries into several branches, the most famous of which was the one that settled in Rome and obtained the title of Prince of Prossedi, Roccasecca and Pisterzo. Two members of this branch married two princesses of the Bonaparte family. In 1749 the counts of Carpegna extinguished in the male line and the marquesses Gabrielli inherited their fief, with the principality of Carpegna-Gattara-Scavolino following in 1817. The line is currently continuing in the family of the princes di Carpegna-Falconieri-Gabrielli.

A branch that settled in Fano was styled Gabrielli-Wiseman and was related to Cardinal Nicholas Wiseman. Another branch settled in Fano was styled Gabrielli di Montevecchio and bears the titles of Duke and Count. The branch that settled in the Kingdom of the Two Sicilies bears the title of Count Gabrielli and Baron of Quercita.

A branch bears the title of Count of Baccaresca and Corraduccio since 1581. It settled in Comtat Venaissin at the end of the 16th century when Bartolomeo de' Gabrielli di Gubbio became Governor of Cavaillon then Carpentras. The line is continuing today in France.

All the branches bear the title of Patrizio di Gubbio (Patrician of Gubbio).
