= Cardinals created by Pius VII =

Catholic appointments from 1800 to 1823

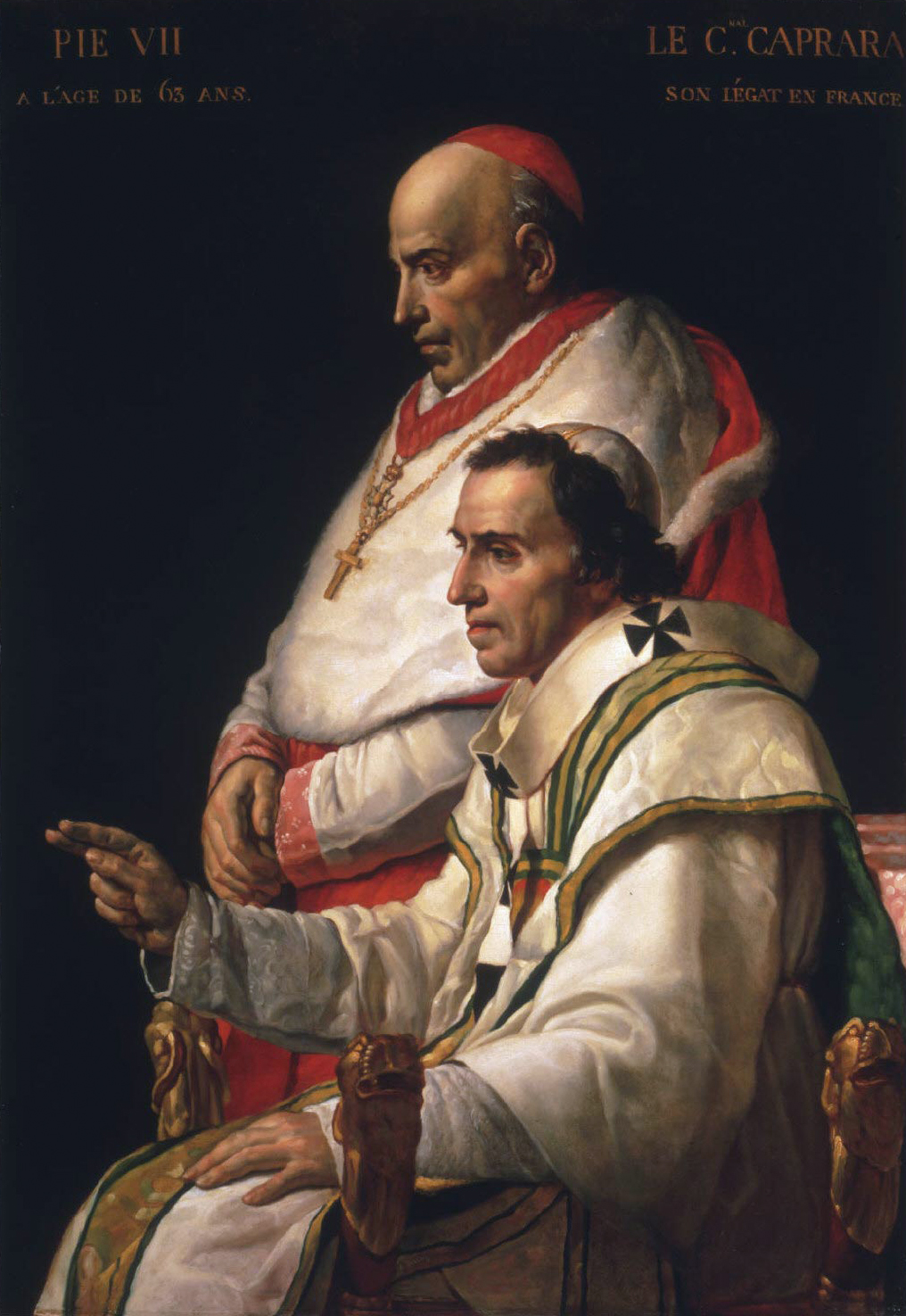
Pope Pius VII (1742-1823) and Cardinal Giovanni Battista Caprara (1733-1810), who was made a cardinal by Pope Pius VI on June 18, 1792.

Pope Pius VII (r. 1800–1823) created 99 cardinals in 19 consistories. 2 of them were future Popes something that was rare until Paul VI which created 3 future popes to cardinal.

== 11 August 1800 ==
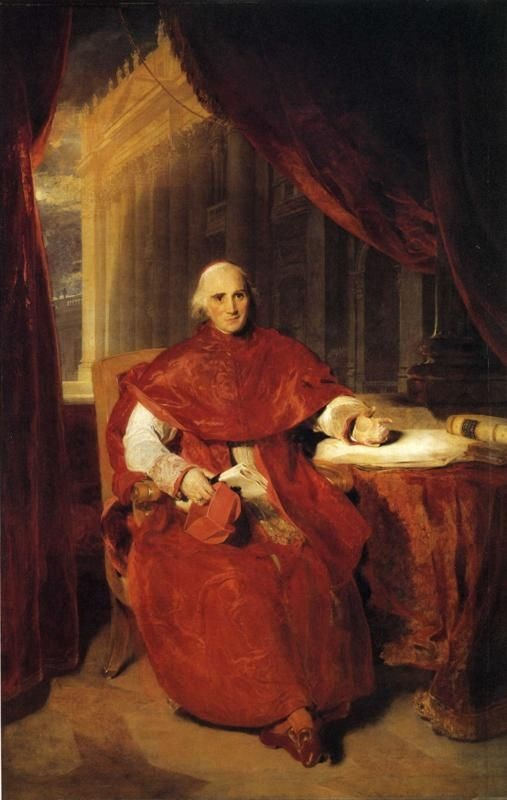
Ercole Consalvi (1757-1824), made a cardinal on August 11, 1800.

1. Diego Innico Caracciolo di Martina
2. Ercole Consalvi

== 20 October 1800 ==
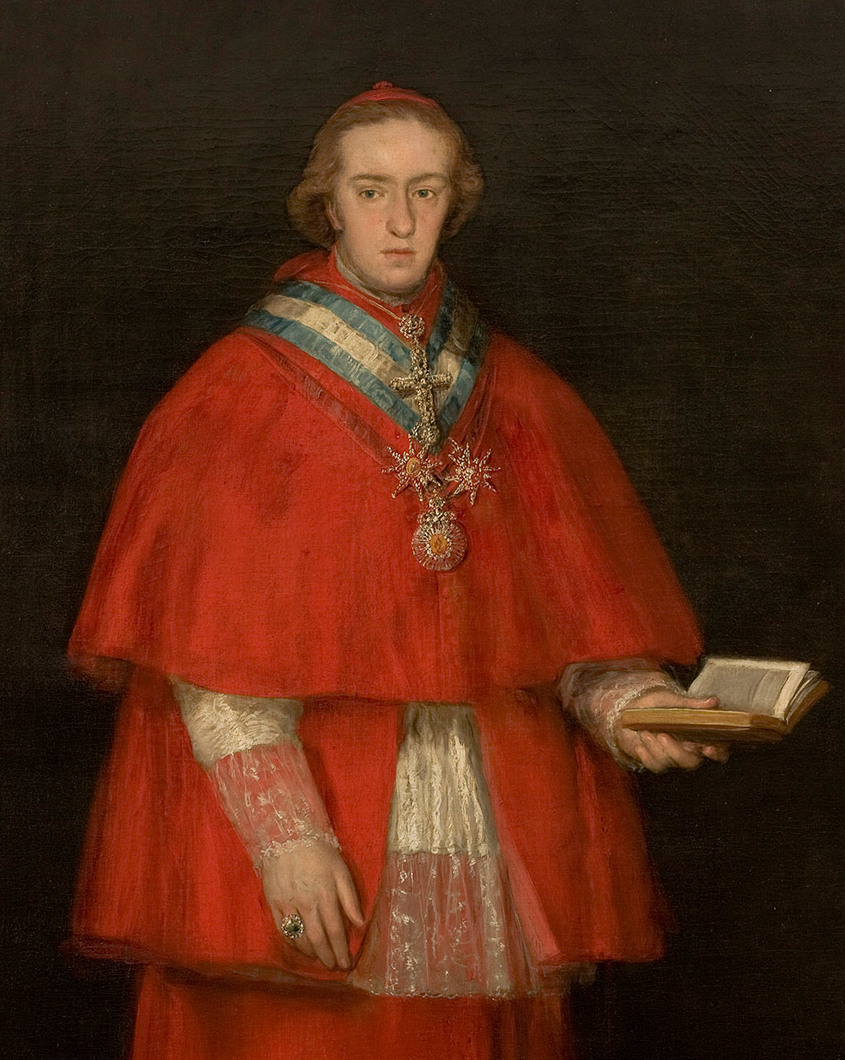
Luis María de Borbón y Vallabriga, 14th Count of Chinchón (1777-1823), made a cardinal on October 20, 1800.

1. Luis María de Borbón y Vallabriga

== 23 February 1801 ==
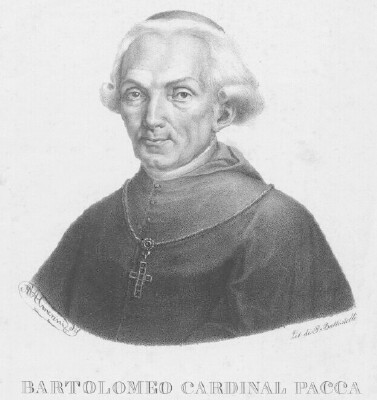
Bartolomeo Pacca (1756-1844), made a cardinal on February 23, 1801.

1. Giuseppe Firrao
2. Ferdinando Maria Saluzzo
3. Luigi Ruffo-Scilla
4. Bartolomeo Pacca
5. Cesare Brancadoro
6. Giovanni Filippo Gallarati Scotti
7. Filippo Casoni
8. Girolamo della Porta
9. Giulio Gabrielli
10. Francesco Mantica
11. Valentino Mastrozzi
12. Giuseppe Albani
13. Marino Carafa di Belvedere
14. Antonio Felice Zondadari
15. Lorenzo Litta
16. Michelangelo Luchi
17. Carlo Crivelli
18. Giuseppe Spina
19. Michele di Pietro
20. Carlo Francesco Caselli
21. Alphonse-Hubert de Latier de Bayane
22. Francesco Maria Locatelli
23. Giovanni Castiglione
24. Charles Erskine

== 9 August 1802 ==
Domenico Pignatelli di Belmonte (1730-1803), made a cardinal on August 9, 1802.

1. Domenico Pignatelli di Belmonte

== 17 January 1803 ==
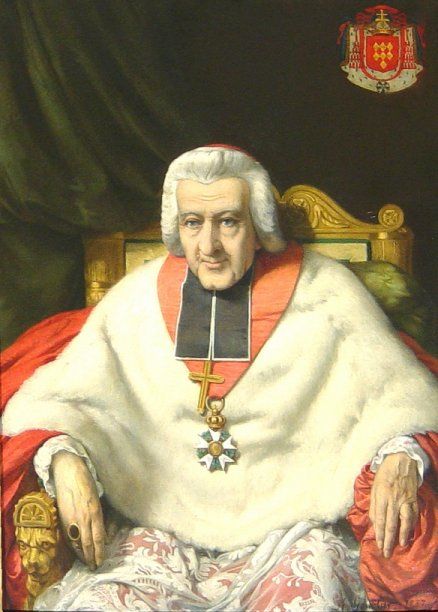
Jean-Baptiste de Belloy (1709-1808), made a cardinal on January 17, 1803.

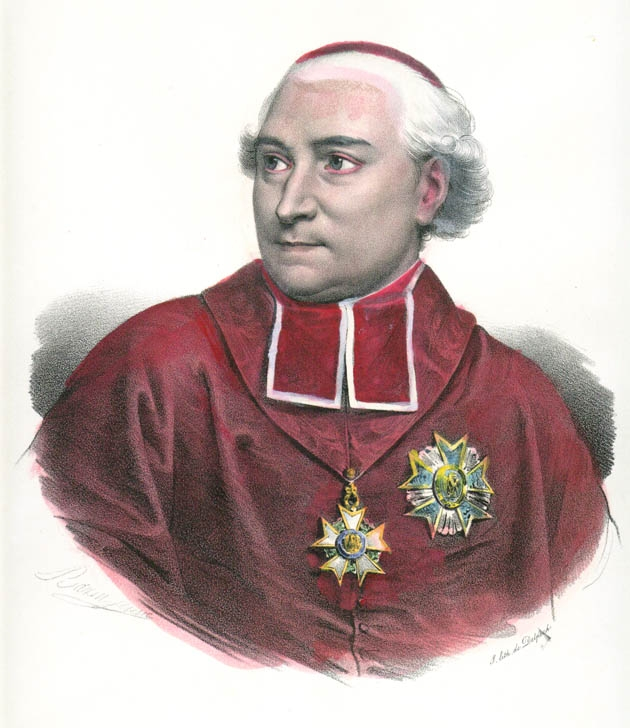
Joseph Fesch (1763-1839), made a cardinal on January 17, 1803.

1. Jean de Dieu-Raymond de Cucé de Boisgelin
2. Anton Theodor Colloredo-Waldsee-Mels
3. Pietro Antonio Zorzi
4. Diego Gregorio Cadello
5. Jean-Baptiste de Belloy
6. Étienne Hubert de Cambacérès
7. Joseph Fesch

== 16 May 1803 ==
1. Miguel Carlos José de Noronha e Silva Abranches
2. Luigi Gazzoli

== 11 July 1803 ==
1. Antonio Despuig y Dameto
2. Pietro Francesco Galleffi

== 26 March 1804 ==
1. Carlo Oppizzoni

== 24 August 1807 ==
1. Francesco Guidobono Cavalchini

== 8 March 1816 ==
1. Annibale della Genga - Elected as Pope Leo XII (1823-1829)
2. Pietro Gravina
3. Domenico Spinucci
4. Lorenzo Caleppi
5. Antonio Gabriele Severoli
6. Giuseppe Morozzo Della Rocca
7. Tommaso Arezzo
8. Francesco Saverio Castiglioni - Elected as Pope Pius VIII (1829-1830)
9. Carlo Andrea Pelagallo
10. Benedetto Naro
11. Francisco Antonio Javier de Gardoqui Arriquíbar
12. Dionisio Bardaxí y Azara
13. Antonio Lamberto Rusconi
14. Emmanuele de Gregorio
15. Giovanni Battista Zauli
16. Nicola Riganti
17. Alessandro Malvasia
18. Francesco Fontana
19. Giovanni Caccia-Piatti
20. Alessandro Lante
21. Pietro Vidoni, iuniore
22. Camillo de Simone
23. Giovanni Battista Quarantotti
24. Giorgio Doria Pamphilj
25. Luigi Ercolani
26. Stanislao Sanseverino
27. Pedro de Quevedo y Quintano
28. Francesco Cesarei Leoni
29. Antonio Lante
30. Lorenzo Prospero Bottini
31. Fabrizio Sceberras Testaferrata

== 23 September 1816 ==
1. Francisco Antonio Cebrián y Valdá
2. Maria-Thaddäus von Trauttmansdorf Weinsberg
3. Franziskus Xaver von Salm-Reifferscheidt
4. Paolo Giuseppe Solaro di Villanova

== 28 July 1817 ==
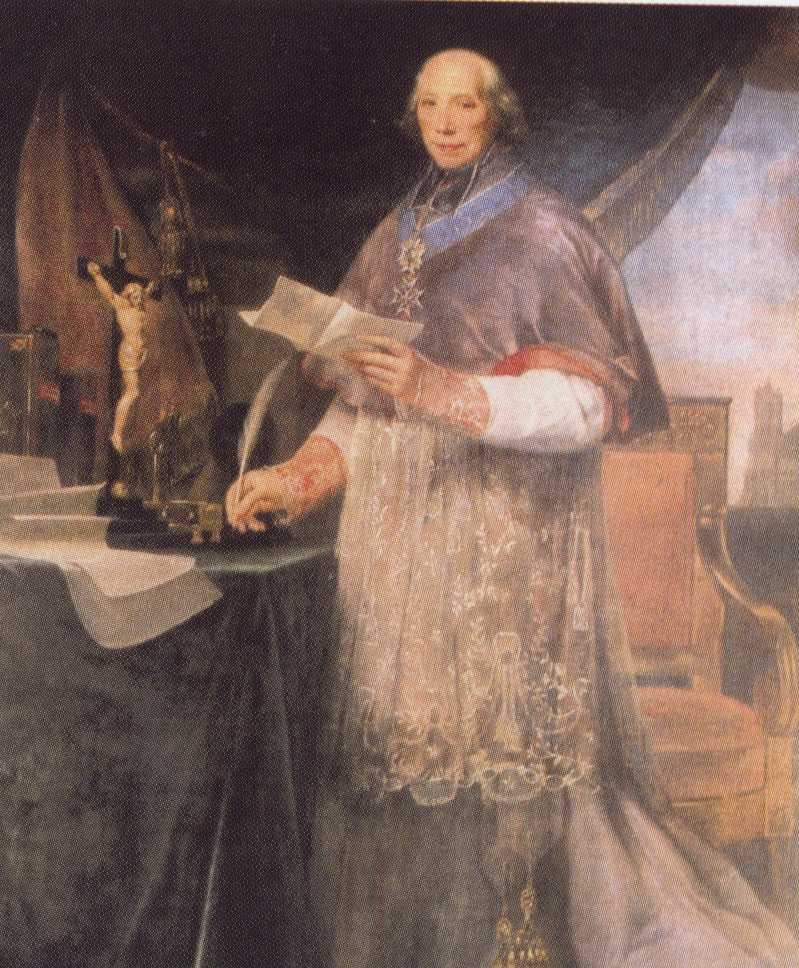
Alexandre Angélique de Talleyrand-Périgord (1736-1821), made a cardinal on July 28, 1817.

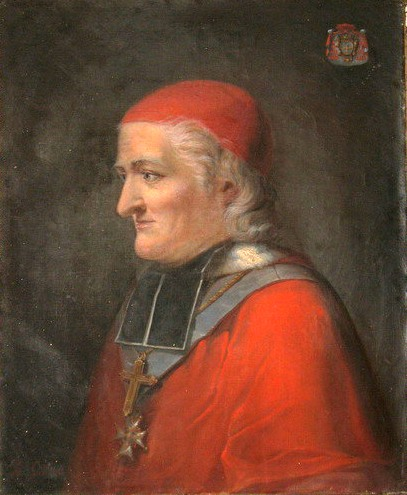
César Guillaume de La Luzerne (1738-1821), made a cardinal on July 28, 1817.

1. Alexandre Angélique de Talleyrand-Périgord
2. César Guillaume de La Luzerne
3. Louis-François de Bausset-Roquefort

== 1 October 1817 ==
1. Agostino Rivarola

== 6 April 1818 ==
1. Johann Casimir von Häffelin

== 4 June 1819 ==
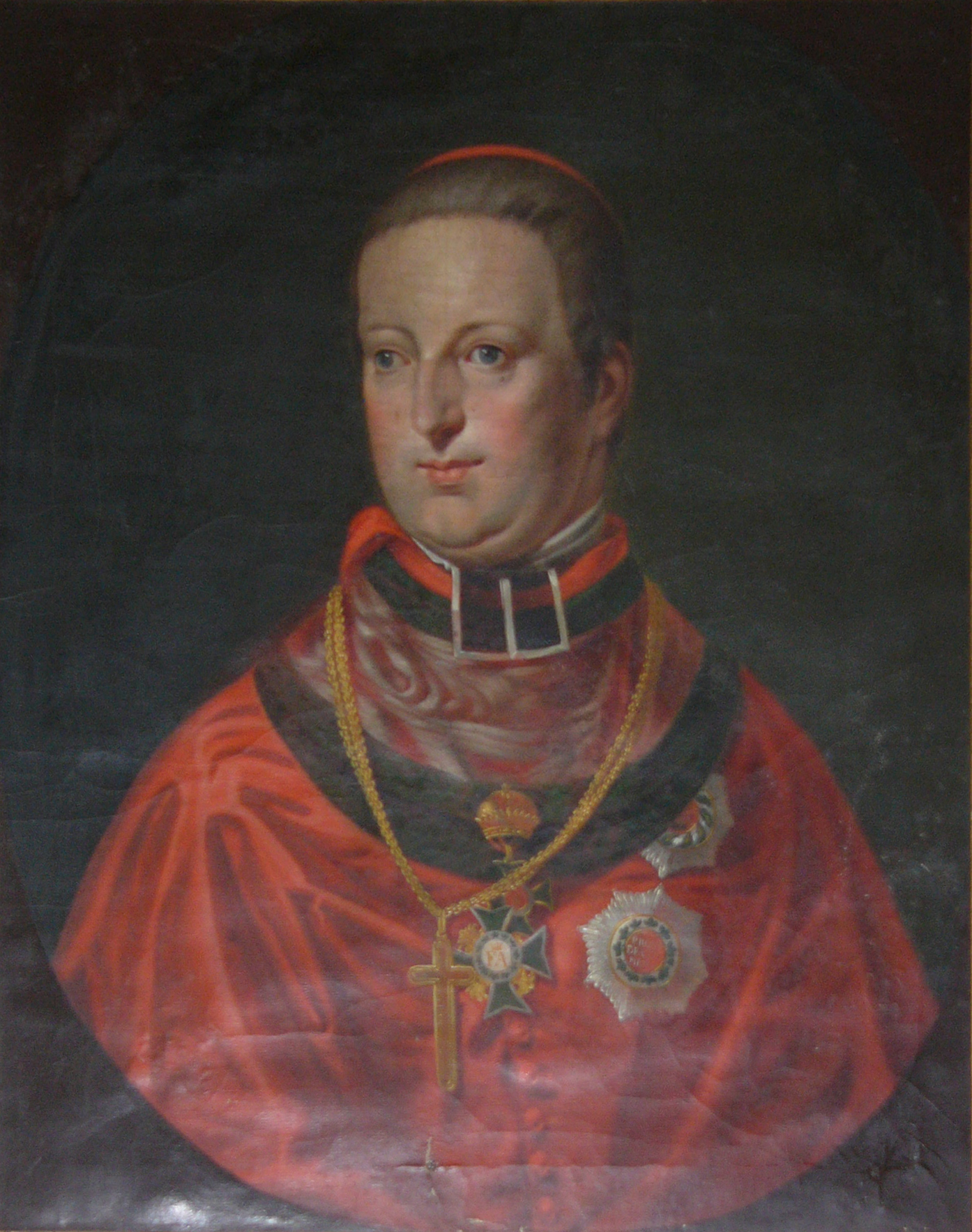
Archduke Rudolf of Austria (1788–1831), made a cardinal on June 4, 1819.

1. Archduke Rudolf of Austria

== 27 September 1819 ==
1. Carlos da Cunha e Meneses
2. Cesare Guerrieri Gonzaga

== 2 December 1822 ==
1. Anne-Antoine-Jules de Clermont-Tonnerre

== 10 March 1823 ==
1. Francesco Bertazzoli
2. Gianfrancesco Falzacappa
3. Antonio Pallotta
4. Francesco Serlupi Crescenzi
5. Carlo Maria Pedicini
6. Luigi Pandolfi
7. Fabrizio Turriozzi
8. Ercole Dandini
9. Carlo Odescalchi
10. Antonio Maria Frosini
11. Tommaso Riario Sforza
12. Viviano Orfini
13. Placido Zurla

== 16 May 1823 ==
1. Anne Louis Henri de La Fare
