= Church of the Name of the Virgin Mary (Křtiny) =

Roman Catholic church in the Czech Republic

- Kostel Jména Panny Marie
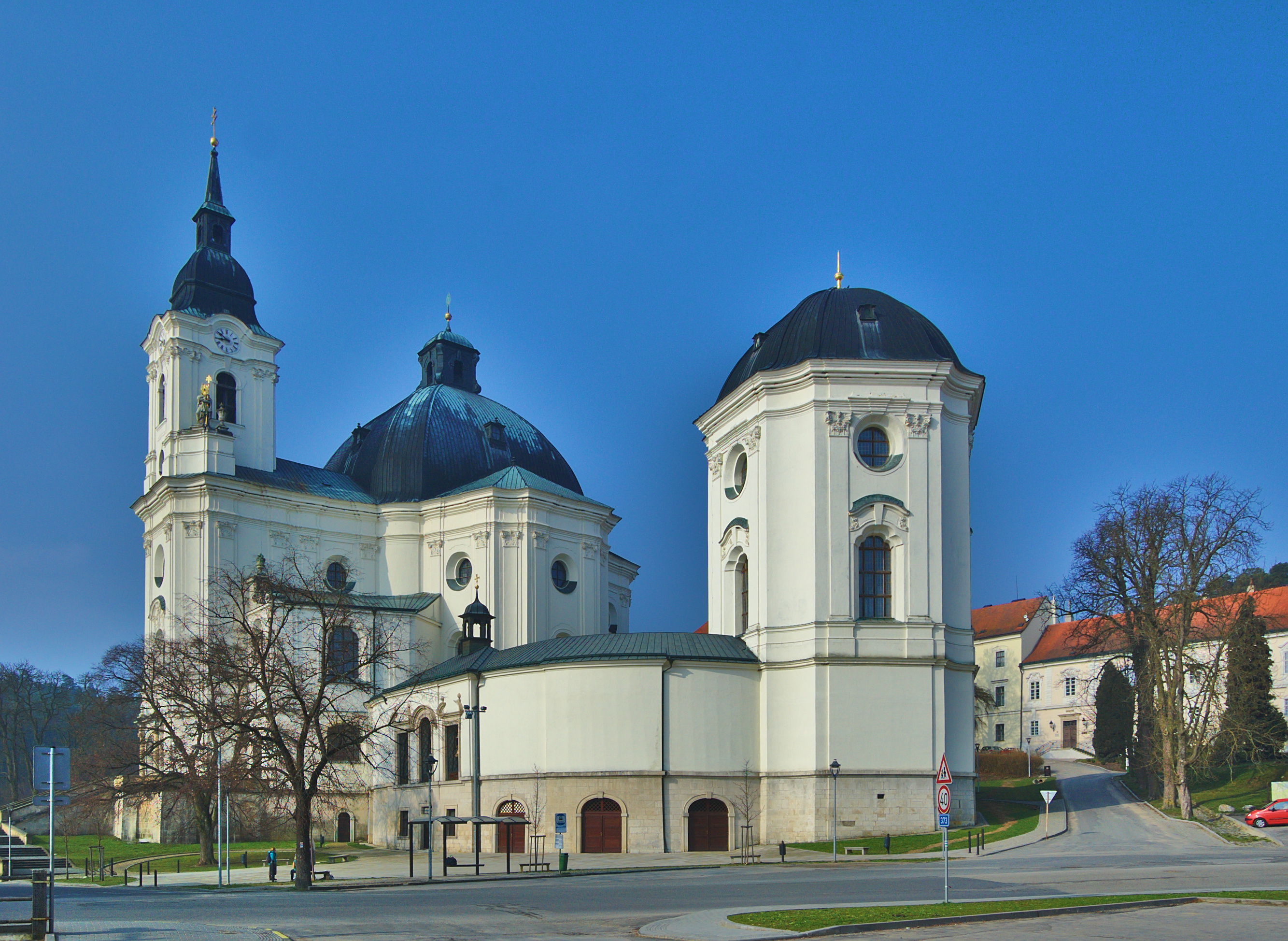
- Church of the Name of the Virgin Mary

- Location within Czech Republic

Religion
- Affiliation: Catholic Church
- Diocese: Blansko District
- Region: South Moravian Region
- Rite: Roman Catholic
- Ecclesiastical or organisational status: Basilica
- Year consecrated: 21 April 1771
- Status: Active

Location
- Location: Křtiny, Czech Republic
- Municipality: Křtiny
- Coordinates: 49.1747°N 16.4433°E

Architecture
- Architect: Jan Santini Aichel
- Type: Church
- Style: Baroque
- Funded by: abbot Hugo Bartlicius
- Groundbreaking: 1711
- Completed: 1771

Specifications
- Length: 65 (inside)
- Width: 35
- Height (max): 73
- Dome height (outer): 54

Website
- http://www.pmkrtiny.cz

Church of the Name of the Virgin Mary (Czech: Kostel Jména Panny Marie) is a Roman Catholic church in Křtiny, South Moravian Region, Czech Republic. It is an important pilgrimage destination in Moravia and one of the most celebrated shrines in Central Europe.

The church was designed by the famous architect Jan Santini Aichel and it was one of the last commissioned by him. It is an iconic masterpiece of so-called radical Baroque of Bohemia and Moravia, built as part of a complex of monastic buildings and summer residences of the Premonstratensian Zábrdovice Abbey, an order dedicated to the preaching and the exercising of pastoral ministry. Santini received the commission in 1711, under the patronage of bishop of Olomouc Maxmilian Hamilton and abbot Hugo Bartlicius, whose palace was behind in the slope. The temple was constructed in time of the rule of abbot Krištof Matuška.

== Gallery ==
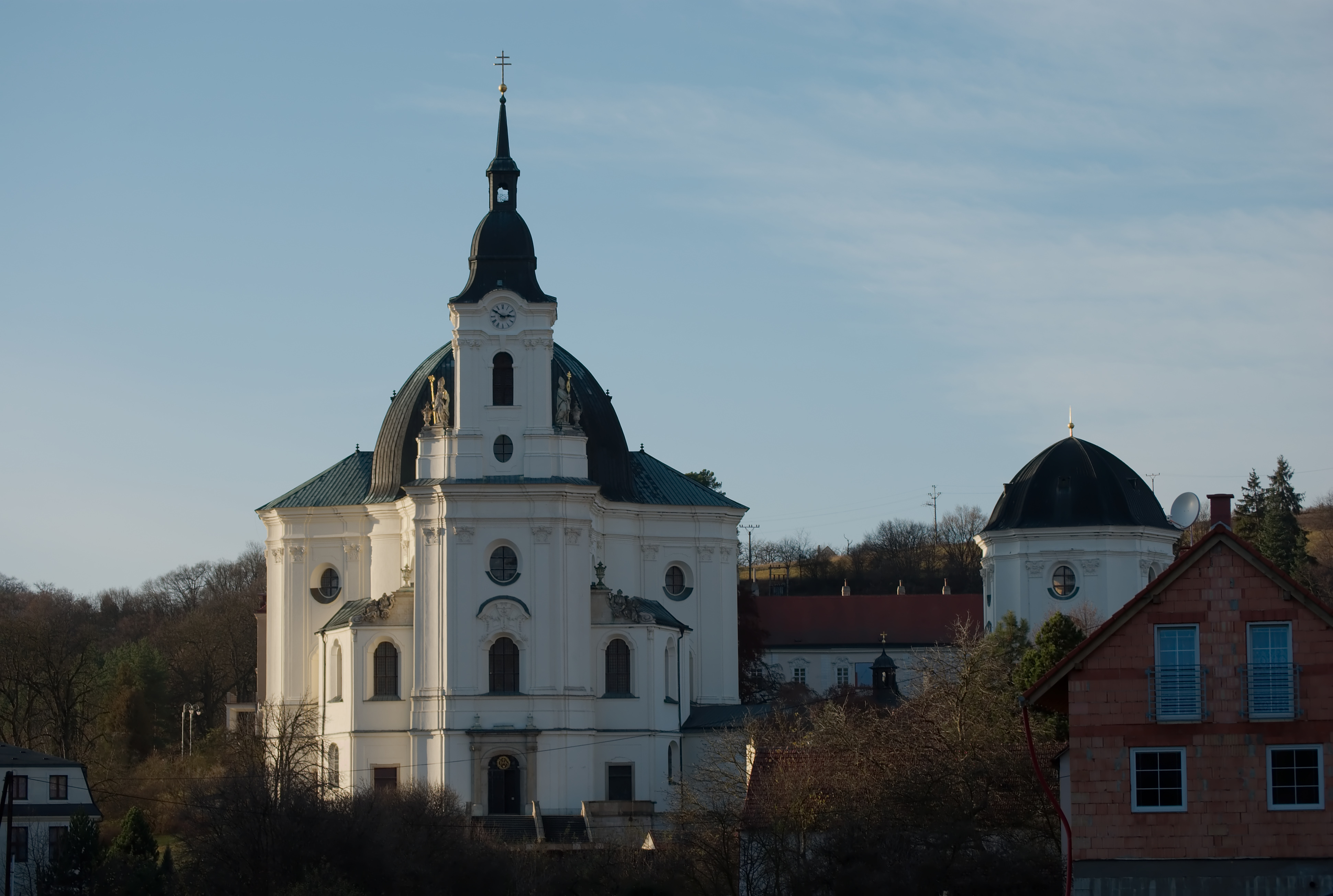
Western façade of the Basilica

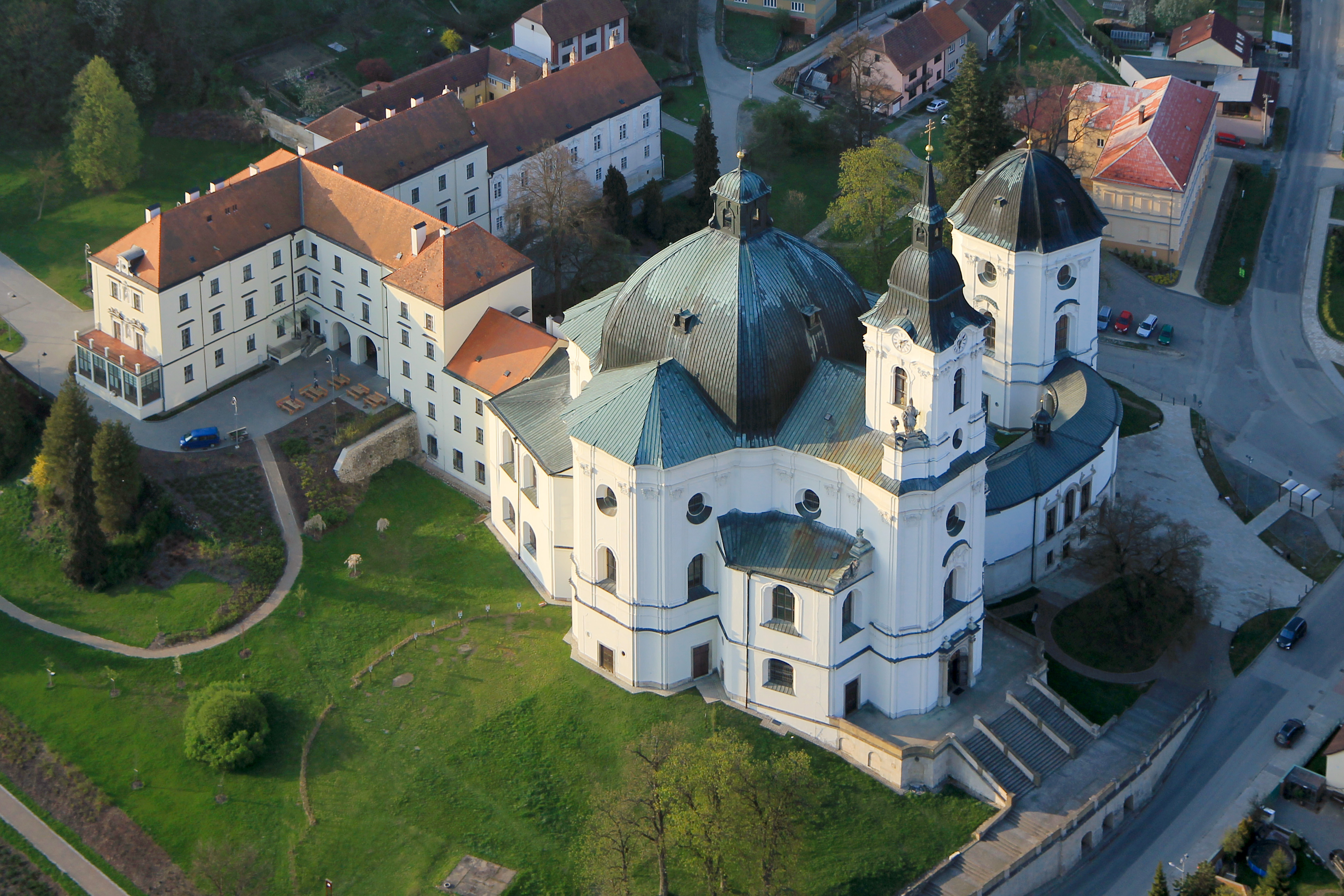
Aerial view

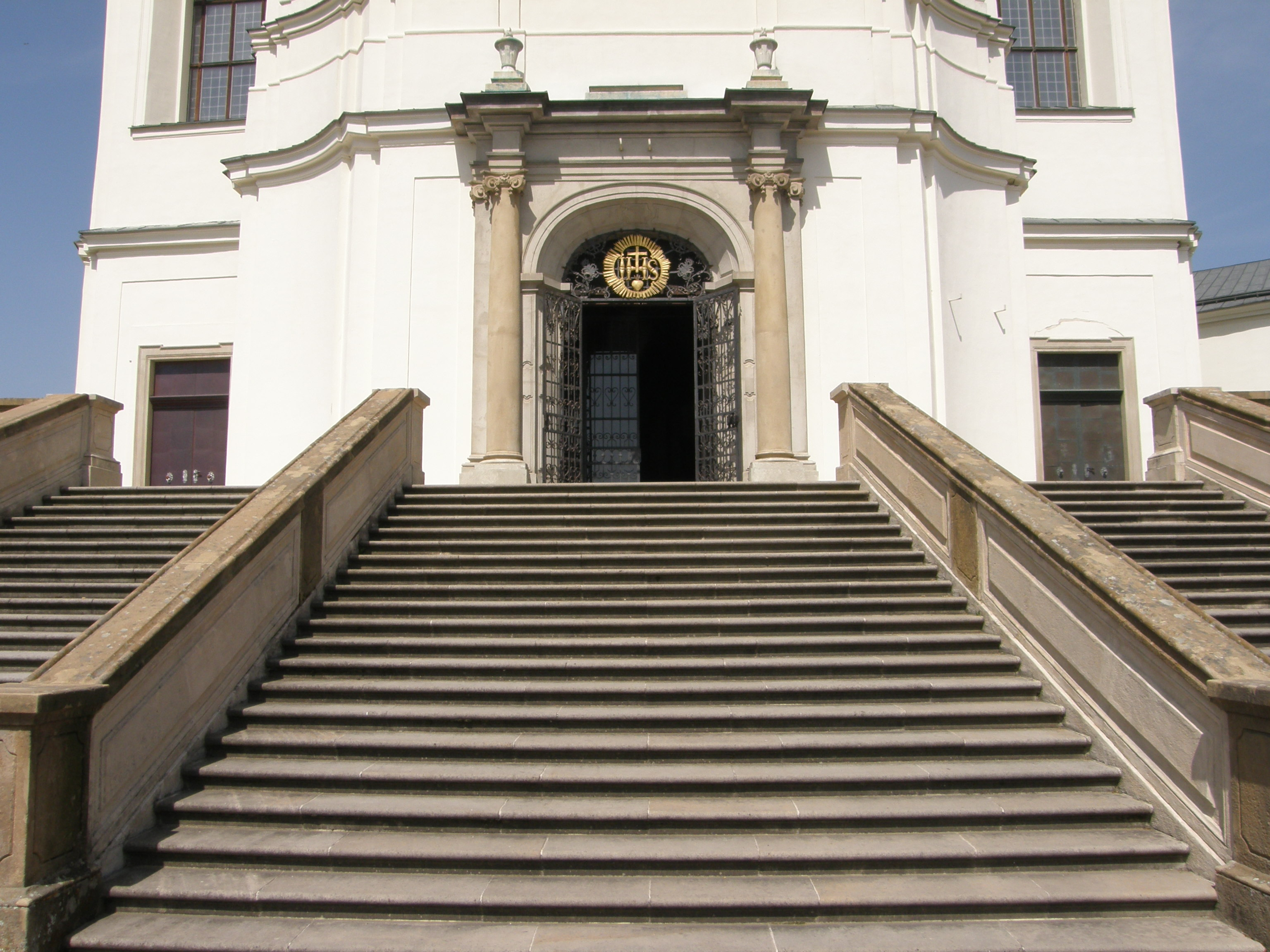
Portal of the Basilica

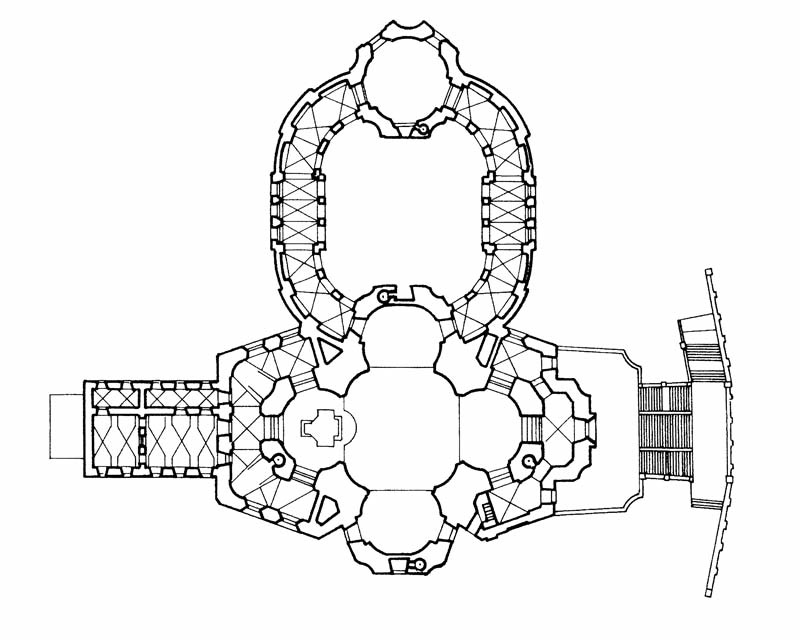
The ground plan
