= List of bishops and archbishops of Olomouc =

The following is a list of diocesan bishops and archbishops of Olomouc. Not much is known about the beginnings of the Diocese of Olomouc. It was reestablished in 1063 and in 1777 it was elevated to an archdiocese.

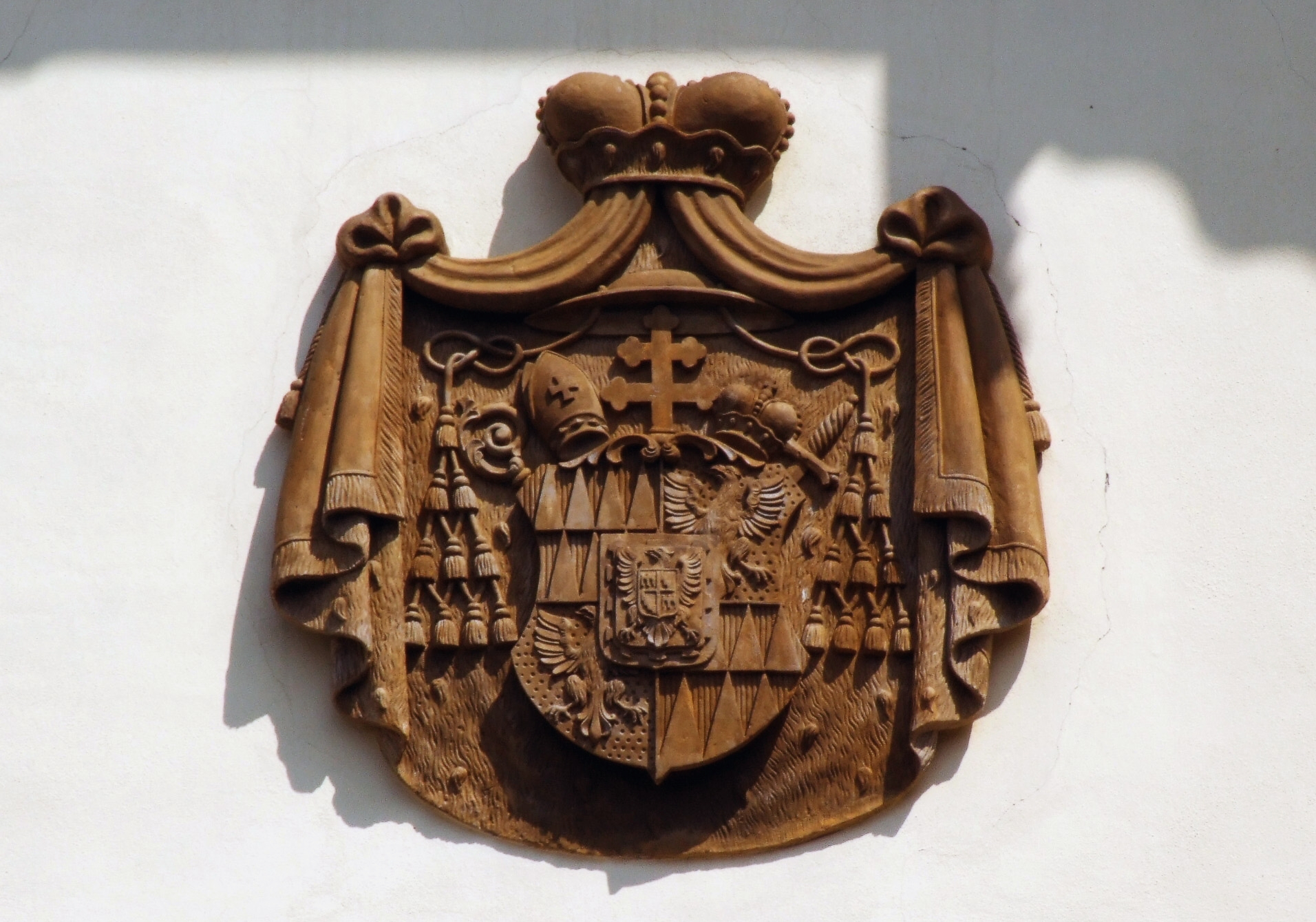
Coat of arms of archbishops in Hukvaldy

== Bishops of Olomouc ==
- 898/900–? Bishop from Rome
- 914–932 Jan (?)'
- Vacant (?)
- 942–947 Silvestr (?), † 961
- 947–976 united with the Bishopric of Regensburg (?)
- 976–981 Vratislav (?)
- 981–991 united with the Bishopric of Regensburg (?)
- 991–1063 united with the Bishopric of Prague (?)
- 1063–1086 Jan I (Johann I von Brenau)
- 1086–1088 united with the Bishopric of Prague (?)
- 1088–1091 Vezel
- 1091–1096 Ondřej
- 1096–1099 Jindřich (?)
- 1097/1099–1104 Petr I
- 1104–1126 Jan II
- 1126–1150 Jindřich Zdík
- 1151–1157 Jan III of Litomyšl
- 1157–1172 Jan IV
- 1172–1182 Dětleb
- 1182–1184 Pelhřim
- 1184–1194 Kaim (Chaim von Böhmen)
- 1194–1199 Engelbert von Brabant
- 1199–1201 Jan V
- 1201–1240 Robert
- 1241–1245 Konrád of Freiberk
- 1245–1281 Bruno von Schauenburg
- 1281–1302 Dětřich
- 1302–1311 Jan VI of Waldstein
- 1311–1316 Petr II
- 1316–1326 Konrád I
- 1327–1333 Jindřich Berka of Dubá
- 1334–1351 Jan Volek
- 1351–1364 Jan Očko of Vlašim
- 1364–1380 John of Neumarkt
- 1381–1387 Petr III
- 1387 Jan X Soběslav
- 1388–1397 Mikuláš of Riesenburk
- 1398–1403 Jan XI
- 1403–1408 Ladislav of Kravaře
- 1409–1412 Conrad of Vechta
- 1412–1416 Václav Králík of Buřenice
- 1416–1430 Jan XII Železný
  1416–1448 Also Slavatzki
- 1430–1434 Konrád III of Zvole
- 1434–1450 Pavel of Miličín
- 1450–1454 Jan XIII
- 1454–1457 Bohuslav of Zvole
- 1457–1482 Protas Černohorský of Boskovice
- 1483/4–1490 John Filipec
- 1487–1489 Jan Vitéz mladší
- 1489–1493 Ardicino della Porta
- 1493–1497 Juan de Borja Lanzol de Romaní, el mayor
- 1497–1540 Stanislav I Thurzo
- 1540–1541 Bernard Zoubek of Zdětín
- 1541–1553 Jan Dubravius
- 1553–1565 Marek Khuen of Olomouc
- 1565–1572 Vilém Prusinovský z Víckova
- 1572–1574 Jan XVII Grodecký
- 1574–1575 Tomáš Albín of Helfenburk
- 1576–1578 Jan XVIII
- 1579–1599 Stanislav II Pavlovský
- 1599–1636 Franz von Dietrichstein
- 1636–1637 Jan XIX Arnošt of Plattenstein
- 1637–1662 Leopold Wilhelm
- 1663–1664 Charles Joseph
- 1664–1695 Karl II von Liechtenstein-Kastelkorn
- 1695–1711 Charles Joseph of Lorraine
- 1711–1738 Wolfgang Schrattenbach
- 1738–1745 Jakob Ernst von Liechtenstein-Kastelkorn
- 1745–1758 Ferdinand Julius Troyer of Troyerstein
- 1758–1760 Leopold II Fridrich of Egkh
- 1761–1776 Maximilian Reichsgraf von Hamilton

== Archbishops of Olomouc ==
- 1777–1811 Antonín Theodor Colloredo-Waldsee
- 1811–1819 Maria Tadeáš Trauttmansdorff
- 1819–1831 Rudolf von Habsburg-Lothringen
- 1831–1836 Ferdinand Maria Chotek
- 1836–1853 Maxmilián Josef Sommerau-Beckh
- 1853–1892 Bedřich z Fürstenberka
- 1893–1904 Theodor Kohn
- 1904–1915 Franziskus von Sales Bauer
- 1916–1920 Lev Skrbenský z Hříště
- 1921–1923 Antonín Cyril Stojan
- 1923–1947 Leopold Prečan
- 1948–1961 Josef Karel Matocha
  bishop Josef Vrana (apostolic administrator 1973–1987)
- 1989–1991 František Vaňák
- 1992-2022 Jan Graubner
- since 2024 Josef Nuzík
