= Giuseppe Doria Pamphili =

Italian cardinal

His Eminence Giuseppe Doria Pamphili
- Cardinal Secretary of State
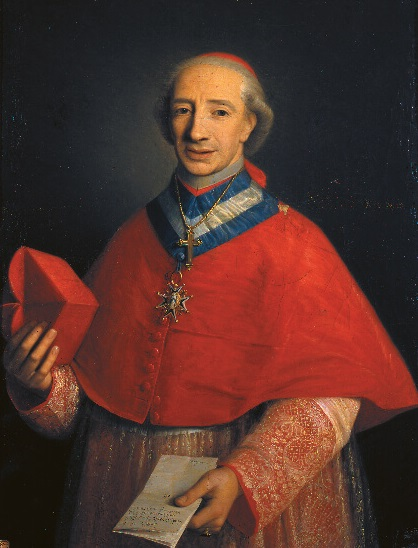
- Portrait by Gaspare Landi
- Church: Catholic Church
- Appointed: 18 March 1797
- Term ended: 29 August 1799
- Predecessor: Ignazio Busca
- Successor: Ercole Consalvi
- Previous posts: Apostolic Nuncio to France (1773–1785); Camerlengo of the Holy Roman Church (1801–1814)

Orders
- Created cardinal: 14 February 1785 by Pope Pius VI
- Rank: Cardinal-Bishop

Personal details
- Born: Giuseppe Maria Doria Pamphili; 11 November 1751 Genoa, Republic of Genoa
- Died: 8 February 1816 (aged 64) Rome, Papal States
- Coat of arms

Giuseppe Maria Doria Pamphili (born 11 November 1751 in Genoa, the capital of the Republic of Genoa – died on 8 February 1816 in Rome) was an Italian cardinal of the Catholic Church who served as Cardinal Secretary of State.

== Biography ==
Giuseppe Maria Doria Pamphili is part of the illustrious family of the Counts of Melfi and the Doria-Pamphilj family, which includes many cardinals. Giuseppe Pamphili was the brother of Cardinal Antonio Maria Doria Pamphili and the uncle of Cardinal Giorgio Doria Pamphili. He was appointed the titualar archbishop of Seleucia in February 1773 at the age of 21, while not yet a priest. He was ordained bishop in July and August. In September, he was appointed apostolic nuncio in France, a position he held until 1785.

He had an epistular exchange with Benjamin Franklin. In some of those letters, Franklin declared his availability to accept a French priest, chosen by the Papacy, to be sent in America in order to manage all the spiritual affairs pertaining the Roman Catholics who wish to establish themselves within the United States. The French priest had the faculty to appoint a suffragan American as his collaborator.

Pope Pius VI created him cardinal during the Papal Consistory of 14 February 1785. He served as Cardinal Secretary of State of the Holy See from 1797 to 1799.

In 1799, he was arrested by the French and deported to Genoa. Cardinal Doria Pamphili was then appointed by Napoleon in 1813, as an intermediary to negotiate the Concordat of Fontainebleau.

Giuseppe Doria Pamphili participated in the conclave of 1799–1800 during which Pius VII was elected pope.

== Episcopal lineage ==
Doria Pamphili's episcopal lineage or apostolic succession was:

- Cardinal Scipione Rebiba
- Cardinal Giulio Antonio Santorio (1566)
- Cardinal Girolamo Bernerio, OP (1586)
- Archbishop Galeazzo Sanvitale (1604)
- Cardinal Ludovico Ludovisi (1621)
- Cardinal Luigi Caetani (1622)
- Cardinal Ulderico Carpegna (1630)
- Cardinal Paluzzo Paluzzi Altieri degli Albertoni (1666)
- Pope Benedict XIII (1675)
- Pope Benedict XIV (1724)
- Archbishop Enrico Enríquez (1743)
- Bishop Manuel Quintano Bonifaz (1749)
- Cardinal Buenaventura Fernández de Córdoba Spínola (1761)
- Giuseppe Maria Cardinal Doria Pamphilj

== Sources ==
- Cheney, David M. (2019), "Buenaventura Cardinal Córdoba Espinosa de la Cerda", Catholic-Hierarchy
- Renata Ago, Carriere e clientele nella Roma barocca, Roma-Bari, Laterza, 1990.
- Cardinals of the Catholic Church

Catholic Church titles
Preceded by Ignazio Busca	Cardinal Secretary of State; 16 March 1797 – 29 August 1799	Succeeded by Ercole Consalvi
