= Zondadari =

Zondadari is an Italian surname. It may refer to:

- Antonio Felice Zondadari (1740-1832), Italian cardinal and Archbishop of Siena
  - not to be confused with his uncle, also a cardinal, Antonio Felice Zondadari the elder (1665–1737)
- Marc'Antonio Zondadari (1658 1722), ruler of Malta
  - Who also built Palazzo Zondadari, better known as Banca Giuratale
