= Jan Dubravius =

Czech churchman, humanist and writer

- Bishop of Olomouc
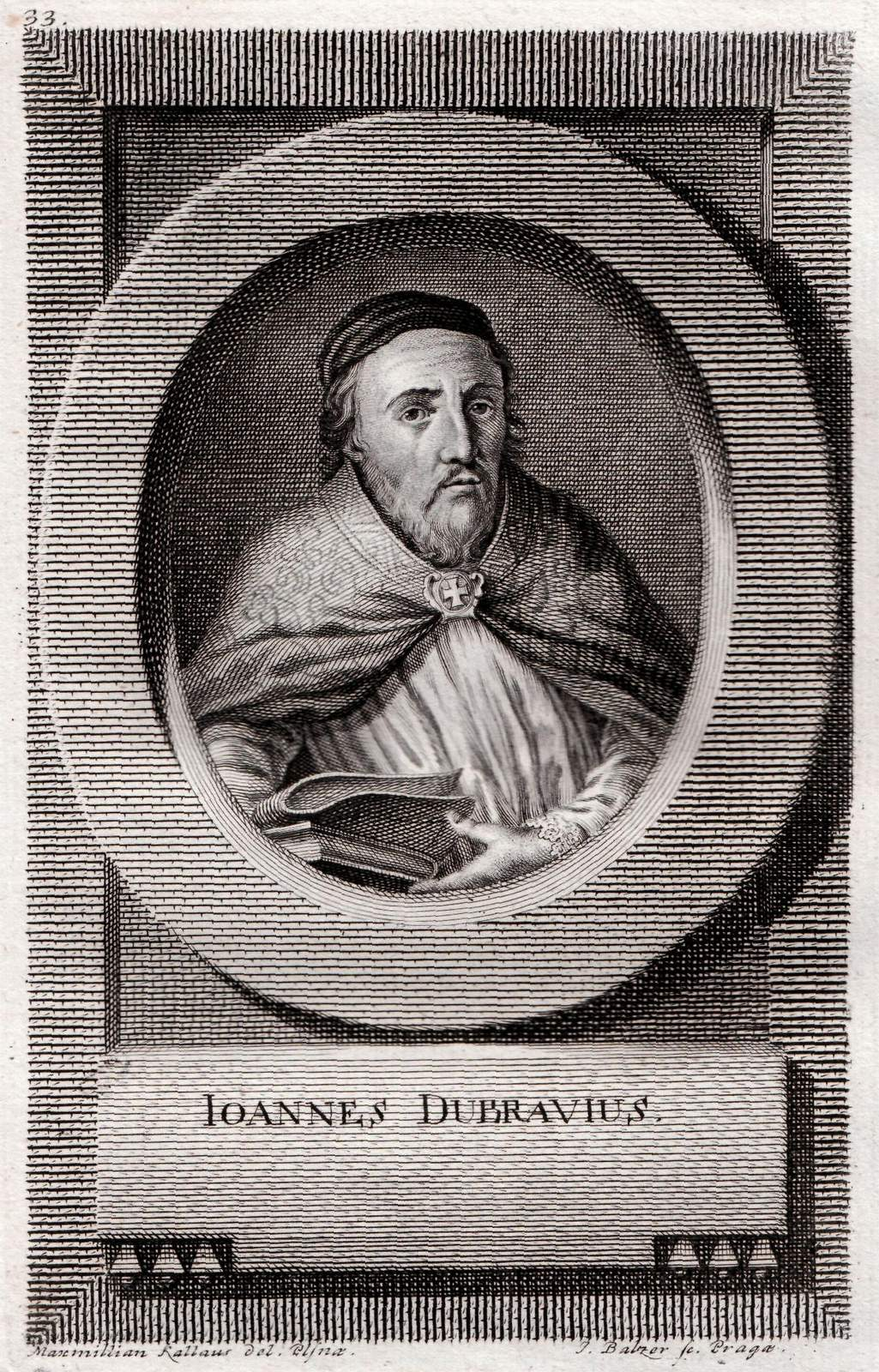
- Jan Dubravius
- Church: Catholic Church
- Diocese: Diocese of Olomouc
- In office: 27 June 1541 – 6 September 1553
- Predecessor: Bernard Zoubek ze Zdětína
- Successor: Marek Khuen z Olomouce

Orders
- Consecration: 2 January 1542 by Dominik Małachowski

Personal details
- Born: Jan Skála z Doubravky a Hradiště; 1486 Plzeň, Kingdom of Bohemia, Holy Roman Empire
- Died: 9 September 1553 (aged 66–67) Kromĕříž, Margraviate of Moravia, Holy Roman Empire

Jo(h)annes Dubravius (c. 1486 in Plzeň – 9 September 1553 in Kroměříž) was a Czech churchman, humanist and writer. He became the bishop of Olomouc. His name is given also as Jan Dubravius or Janus Dubravius, Jan Skála z Doubravky and Jan z Doubravky, and Dubravinius.

He studied in the grammar school at Plzen. For higher education, he studied at the University of Prague, as well as the gymnasium at Vienna. At the University of Padua, he obtained the degree of Doctor of Ecclesiastical Law.

He returned to Bohemia in 1511 or 1512. He became Archdeacon of Olomouc, as well as Provost at Kremsier and Olbramstkastel.

Dubravius was involved in negotiating a family alliance between King Sigismund and Francesco Sforza, Duke of Milan.

== Works ==
- Martiani Capellae Nuptiae Mercurii cum Philologia, Commentary on Martianus Capella
- Theriobulia Joannis Dubravii iurisconsulti et equitis aurati De regiis praeceptis, poetic beast fables
- Commentarii in V Davidis psalmum
- Libellus de piscinis et piscium, qui in eis aluntur natura, a work on fish ponds, dedicated to Anton Fugger, cited by Izaak Walton
- Historia regni Bohemiae (1552), chronicle
