= Ignazio Busca =

Italian cardinal and Secretary of State of the Holy See

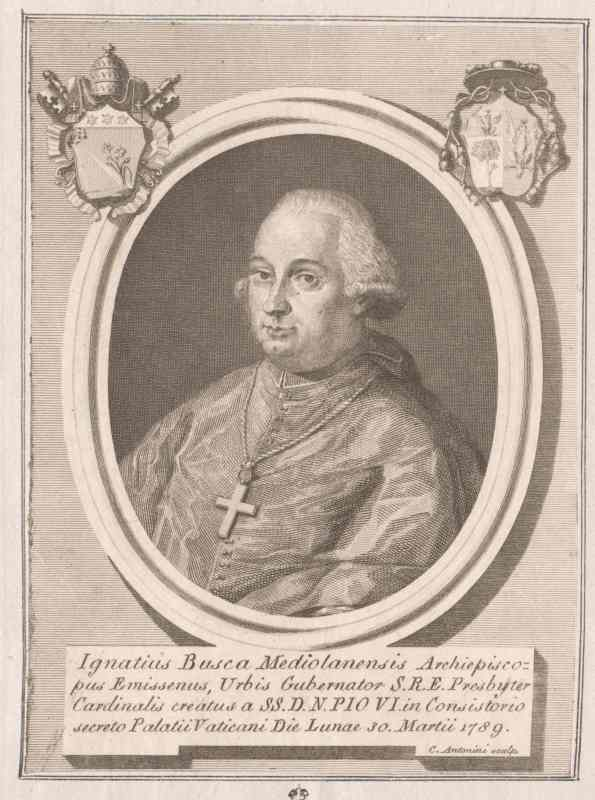
Ignazio Busca

Ignazio Busca (31 August 1731 – 12 August 1803) was an Italian Catholic prelate who served as Secretary of State of the Holy See. He was made a cardinal in 1789.

== Biography ==
Busca was born in 31 August 1731, in Milan.

He was the last son of Lodovico Busca, marquess of Lomagna and Bianca Arconati Visconti.

He took a degree in utroque iure in 1759 at the Università La Sapienza of Rome.

Relator of the Sacred Consulta and referendary of the tribunal of the Apostolic Signature, he was ordained priest on 20 August 1775.

Elected titular archbishop of Emesa, he was consecrated on 17 September 1775, in Frascati, by Henry Benedict Stuart. He was apostolic nuncio in Flanders and apostolic vicar for Netherlands from then to 1785 (at the time called Batavia).

Busca later was governor of Rome and Vice-Camerlango from 1785 until 1789. Created cardinal in the consistory of 30 March 1789, he received the Galero and the title of Santa Maria della Pace on 3 August 1789.

He was appointed Secretary of State by Pope Pius VI in 1796, serving less than a year, during which he was involved in several difficult and important negotiations on behalf of Pius VI. He was succeeded as Secretary of State by Ercole Consalvi. In February 1798, after the French military invaded Rome, Busca was forced to flee to Naples.

He participated in the Papal conclave of 1799-1800. The government of the Austrian Empire, which controlled Venice, the extraordinary site of the Conclave, let it be known that they did not want Busca, and several other Cardinals, to be the next Pope; thus he was stricken from the list of papabili. After one of the longest conclaves of modern times, Barnaba Chiaramonti was elected Pius VII.

From 1800 to 1803, he was prefect of the Congregation of Good Government,

He died on 12 August 1803 in Rome.

Catholic Church titles
Preceded by Francesco Saverio de Zelada	Cardinal Secretary of State; 1796-1797	Succeeded by Giuseppe Doria Pamphili
