= Filippo Casoni =

19th-century Roman Catholic cardinal

His Eminence Filippo Casoni
- Cardinal-Priest of Santa Maria degli Angeli
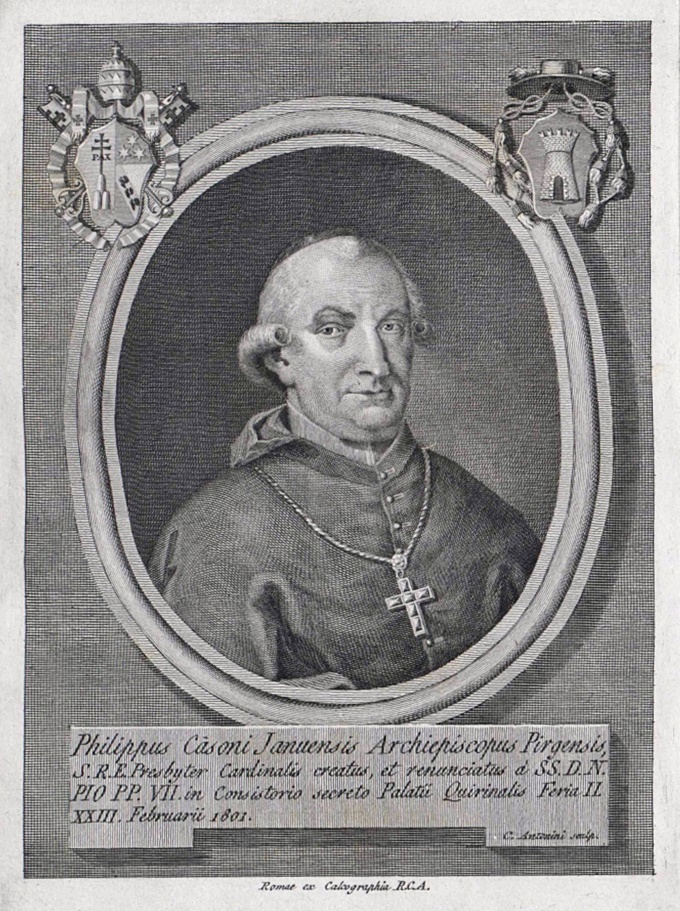
- Church: Catholic Church

Orders
- Consecration: 4 May 1794 by Hyacinthe-Sigismond Gerdil

Personal details
- Born: 6 Mar 1733 Sarzana, Italy
- Died: 9 Oct 1811 (age 78) Rome, Italy

Filippo Casoni (6 March 1733 – 9 October 1811) was a Roman Catholic cardinal, the last governor of Avignon before the annexation to France.

== Biography ==
On 4 May 1794, he was consecrated bishop by Hyacinthe-Sigismond Gerdil, Cardinal-Priest of Santa Cecilia, with Ottavio Boni, Titular Archbishop of Nazianzus, and Michele di Pietro, Titular Bishop of Isauropolis, serving as co-consecrators.

Catholic Church titles
Preceded by Francesco Maria Piccolomini (archbishop)	Titular Archbishop of Perge; 1794–1804	Succeeded by Luigi Bottiglia Savoulx
Preceded by Ippolito Antonio Vincenti Mareri	Apostolic Nuncio to Spain; 1794–1801	Succeeded by Pietro Gravina
Preceded by Ignazio Busca	Cardinal-Priest of Santa Maria degli Angeli; 1804–1811	Succeeded by Giuseppe Morozzo Della Rocca
Preceded by Ercole Consalvi	Cardinal Secretary of State; 1806–1808	Succeeded by Giulio Gabrielli the Younger
