= Giorgio Doria Pamphilj Landi =

Italian cardinal (1772–1837)

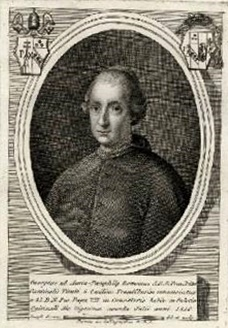

Giorgio Doria Pamphilj Landi (17 November 1772 – 16 November 1837) was a cardinal of the Roman Catholic Church.

He was born in Rome, Italy to the prominent Genoese family of Doria-Pamphili-Landi. He was distantly related to Pope Innocent X (1574-1655). Giorgio had two uncles, Antonio Maria and Giuseppe Maria, and one grand-uncle, also named Giorgio (1708-1759), who also served as cardinals.

The Younger Giorgio was first ordained a priest on 17 November 1804. He was elevated by Pope Pope Pius VII to be a Cardinal In pectore on 8 March 1816, and not elevated to the position until 22 July 1816. He was appointed Prefect of the Sacred Congregation of Rites in 1771. He participated in the conclave of 1823, 1829, and 1830–1831.
