= Cardinal Secretary of State =

Head of the Secretariat of State of the Holy See

The Secretary of State of the Holy See
- Secretarius Status; Segretario di Stato
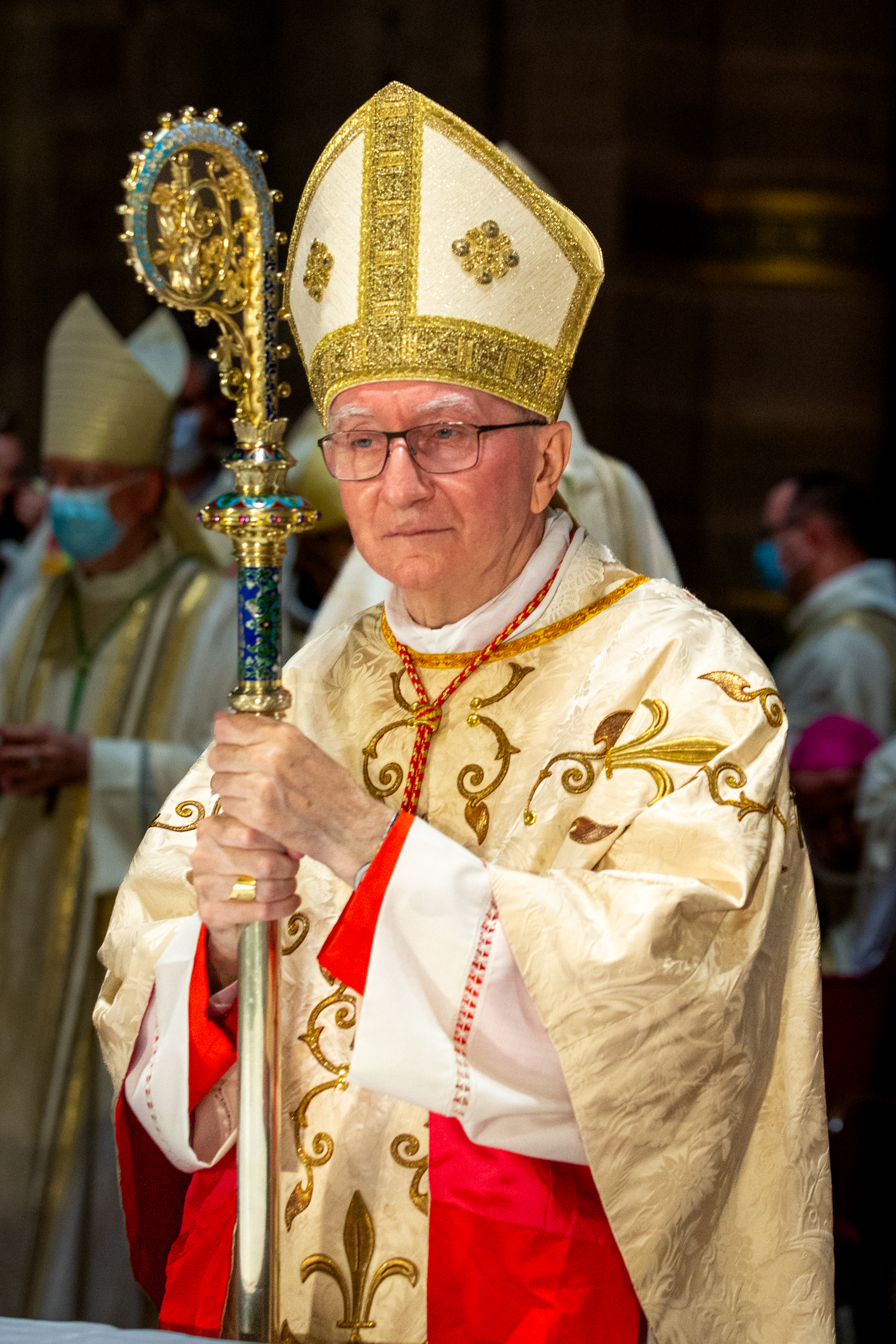
- Incumbent; Pietro Parolin since 15 October 2013
- Secretariat of State
- Style: His Eminence
- Member of: Roman Curia; Council of Cardinals
- Reports to: The Pope
- Appointer: The Pope
- Term length: At His Holiness pleasure (expires upon death of the Pontiff, re-appointable)
- Formation: 20 November 1551
- First holder: Girolamo Dandini
- Unofficial names: Cardinal Secretary of State

The Secretary of State of the Holy See, also known as the Cardinal Secretary of State, the Secretary of State of His Holiness (Latin: Secretarius Status Sanctitatis Suae; Italian: Segretario di Stato di Sua Santità) or the Vatican Secretary of State, presides over the Secretariat of State of the Holy See, the oldest and most important dicastery of the Roman Curia. The Secretariat of State performs all the political and diplomatic functions of the Holy See and Vatican City. The Cardinal Secretary of State is considered the head of government of the Holy See, equivalent to a prime minister.

Cardinal Pietro Parolin has served as secretary of state since 2013, nominated by Pope Francis and confirmed by Pope Leo XIV in May 2025.

== Duties ==
The secretary of state is appointed by the pope, and serves as one of his principal advisors. As one of the senior offices in the Roman Catholic Church, the secretary is required to be a cardinal. If the office is vacant, someone other than a cardinal may serve as provisional secretary of state, exercising the powers of the secretary of state until a suitable replacement is found or the pro-secretary is made a cardinal in a subsequent consistory.

The secretary's term ends when the pope who appointed him dies or leaves office. During the sede vacante period, the former secretary acts as a member of a commission with the camerlengo of the Holy Roman Church and the former president of the Pontifical Commission for Vatican City State, which exercises some of the functions of the head of state of the Vatican City State until a new pope is elected. Once the new pope is chosen, the former secretary's role in the commission likewise expires, though he can be re-appointed as secretary of state.

== History ==
The office traces its origins to that of secretarius intimus, created by Pope Leo X in the early 16th century to handle correspondence with the diplomatic missions of the Holy See, which were just beginning to become permanent postings instead of missions sent on particular occasions. At this stage the secretary was a fairly minor functionary, the papal administration being led by the Cardinal Nephew, the pope's confidant usually taken from his family.

The imprudence of Pope Julius III in entrusting the office of cardinal nephew to his alleged lover Innocenzo Ciocchi Del Monte, a teenaged, virtually illiterate street urchin whom his brother had adopted a few years earlier, led to an upgrading of the secretary's job, as the incumbent had to take over the duties the cardinal nephew was unfit for. By the time of Pope Innocent X the secretary of state was always himself a cardinal, and Pope Innocent XII abolished the office of cardinal nephew in 1692. From then onward the secretary of state has been the most important of the officials of the Holy See.

The separate position of Cardinal Secretary for Internal State Affairs was created by Pope Gregory XVI in 1833 at the request of Tommaso Bernetti, then secretary of state, reducing the workload of the secretary of state.

In 1968, Pope Paul VI's apostolic constitution Regimini Ecclesiae Universae further enhanced the powers of the secretary of state, placing him over all the other departments of the Roman Curia. In 1973 Pope Paul further broadened the secretaryship by abolishing the ancient office of Chancellor of the Holy Roman Church and merging its functions into those of the secretary of state.

== List ==
=== Secretaries of State between 1551 and 1644 ===
- Girolamo Dandini (1551–1555)
- Carlo Borromeo (1560–1565)
- Tolomeo Gallio (1565–1566)
- Girolamo Rusticucci (1566–1572)
- Tolomeo Gallio (again) (1572–1585)
- Decio Azzolini (seniore) (1585–1587)
- Alessandro Peretti di Montalto (Cardinal Nephew) (1587–1590)
- Paolo Emilio Sfondrati (Cardinal Nephew) (1591)
- Giovanni Antonio Facchinetti de Nuce (Cardinal Nephew) (1591)
- Pierbenedetto Peretti (1592–1593)
- Pietro Aldobrandini (Cardinal Nephew) and Cinzio Passeri Aldobrandini (Cardinal Nephew) (1593–1605)
- Roberto Ubaldini (1605)
- Erminio Valenti (1605)
- Lanfranco Margotti (1605–1611)
- Porfirio Feliciani (1611–1621)
- Giovanni Battista Agucchi (1621–1623)
- Lorenzo Magalotti (1623–1628)
- Lorenzo Azzolini (1628–1632)
- Pietro Benessa (1632–1634)
- Francesco Adriano Ceva (1634–1643)
- Giovanni Battista Spada (1643–1644)

=== Cardinal Secretaries of State since 1644 ===
No.	Name	From	Until	First appointer
1	Giovanni Giacomo Panciroli (1587–1651)	15 September 1644	3 September 1651 †	Innocent X
2	Fabio Chigi (elected Pope Alexander VII) (1599–1667)	3 December 1652	7 January 1655	Innocent X
3	Giulio Rospigliosi (elected Pope Clement IX) (1600–1669)	7 April 1655	22 May 1667	Alexander VII
4	Decio Azzolino (1623–1689)	25 June 1667	9 December 1669	Clement IX
5	Federico Borromeo (1617–1673)	11 May 1670	18 February 1673 †	Clement X
6	Francesco Nerli (1636–1708)	1 August 1673	22 July 1676	Clement X
7	Alderano Cybo-Malaspina (1613–1700)	23 September 1676	12 August 1689	Innocent XI
8	Giambattista Rubini (1642–1707)	6 October 1689	1 February 1691	Alexander VIII
9	Fabrizio Spada (1643–1717)	14 July 1691	27 September 1700	Innocent XII
10	Fabrizio Paolucci (1651–1726)	3 December 1700	19 March 1721	Clement XI
11	Giorgio Spinola (1667–1739)	10 May 1721	7 March 1724	Innocent XIII
12 (10)	Fabrizio Paolucci (1651–1726)	6 June 1724	12 June 1726 †	Benedict XIII
13	Niccolò Maria Lercari (1675–1757)	21 June 1726	21 February 1730	Benedict XIII
14	Antonio Banchieri (1667–1733)	15 July 1730	16 September 1733 †	Clement XII
15	Giuseppe Firrao the Elder (1670–1744)	4 October 1733	6 February 1740	Clement XII
16	Silvio Valenti Gonzaga (1690–1756)	20 August 1740	28 August 1756 †	Benedict XIV
17	Alberico Archinto (1698–1758)	20 September 1756	30 September 1758 †	Benedict XIV
18	Ludovico Maria Torriggiani (1697–1777)	8 October 1758	2 February 1769	Clement XIII
19	Lazzaro Opizio Pallavicini (1719–1785)	19 May 1769	23 February 1785 †	Clement XIV
20	Ignazio Gaetano Boncompagni Ludovisi (1743–1790)	29 June 1785	30 September 1789	Pius VI
21	Francesco Saverio de Zelada (1717–1801)	14 October 1789	10 February 1796	Pius VI
22	Ignazio Busca (1731–1803)	9 August 1796	18 March 1797	Pius VI
23	Giuseppe Maria Doria Pamphilj (1751–1816)	18 March 1797	29 August 1799	Pius VI
24	Ercole Consalvi (1757–1824)	11 August 1800	17 June 1806	Pius VII
25	Filippo Casoni (1733–1811)	17 June 1806	2 February 1808	Pius VII
26	Giulio Gabrielli the Younger (1748–1822)	26 March 1808	26 July 1814	Pius VII
27 (24)	Ercole Consalvi (1757–1824)	26 July 1814	20 August 1823	Pius VII
28	Giulio Maria della Somaglia (1744–1830)	28 September 1823	17 January 1828	Leo XII
29	Tommaso Bernetti (1779–1852)	17 January 1828	10 February 1829	Leo XII
30	Giuseppe Albani (1750–1834)	31 March 1829	30 November 1830	Pius VIII
31 (29)	Tommaso Bernetti (1779–1852)	21 February 1831	12 January 1836	Gregory XVI
32	Luigi Lambruschini (1776–1854)	12 January 1836	1 June 1846	Gregory XVI
33	Tommaso Pasquale Gizzi (1787–1849)	8 August 1846	5 July 1847	Pius IX
34	Gabriele Ferretti (1795–1860)	17 July 1847	1 February 1848	Pius IX
35	Giuseppe Bofondi (1795–1867)	1 February 1848	10 March 1848	Pius IX
36	Giacomo Antonelli (1806–1876)	10 March 1848	4 May 1848	Pius IX
37	Antonio Francesco Orioli (1778–1852)	4 May 1848	2 June 1848	Pius IX
38	Giovanni Soglia Ceroni (1779–1856)	4 June 1848	29 November 1848	Pius IX
39 (36)	Giacomo Antonelli (1806–1876)	29 November 1848	6 November 1876 †	Pius IX
40	Giovanni Simeoni (1816–1892)	18 December 1876	5 March 1878	Pius IX
41	Alessandro Franchi (1819–1878)	5 March 1878	31 July 1878 †	Leo XIII
42	Lorenzo Nina (1812–1885)	9 August 1878	16 December 1880	Leo XIII
43	Luigi Jacobini (1832–1887)	16 December 1880	28 February 1887 †	Leo XIII
44	Mariano Rampolla del Tindaro (1843–1913)	2 July 1887	20 July 1903	Leo XIII
45	Rafael Merry del Val (1865–1930)	12 November 1903	20 August 1914	Pius X
46	Domenico Ferrata (1847–1914)	4 September 1914	10 October 1914 †	Benedict XV
47	Pietro Gasparri (1852–1934)	13 October 1914	7 February 1930	Benedict XV
48	Eugenio Pacelli (elected Pope Pius XII) (1876–1958)	9 February 1930	10 February 1939	Pius XI
49	Luigi Maglione (1877–1944)	10 March 1939	22 August 1944 †	Pius XII
Office vacant
50	Domenico Tardini (1888–1961)	15 December 1958	30 July 1961 †	John XXIII
51	Amleto Giovanni Cicognani (1883–1973)	12 August 1961	30 April 1969	John XXIII
52	Jean-Marie Villot (1905–1979)	2 May 1969	9 March 1979 †	Paul VI
53	Agostino Casaroli (1914–1998)	1 July 1979	1 December 1990	John Paul II
54	Angelo Sodano (1927–2022)	29 June 1991	15 September 2006	John Paul II
55	Tarcisio Bertone (b. 1934)	15 September 2006	15 October 2013	Benedict XVI
56	Pietro Parolin (b. 1955)	15 October 2013	Incumbent	Francis

== In popular culture ==
- Silvio Orlando portrayed fictional Cardinal Secretary of State Voiello in the 2016 Sky Italia Sky Atlantic HBO Canal+ co-produced television series The Young Pope and the 2019 follow-up series The New Pope.
- Robert Harris' novel Conclave features fictional Cardinal Secretary of State Aldo Bellini. The character is played by Stanley Tucci in the film adaptation.

== See also ==
- Secretary of State
- Index of Vatican City-related articles
