= Archduke Rudolf of Austria =

Austrian cardinal and noble (1788–1831)

His Eminence Archduke Rudolph of Austria
- Cardinal, Archbishop of Olomouc; Prince Royal of Hungary and Bohemia
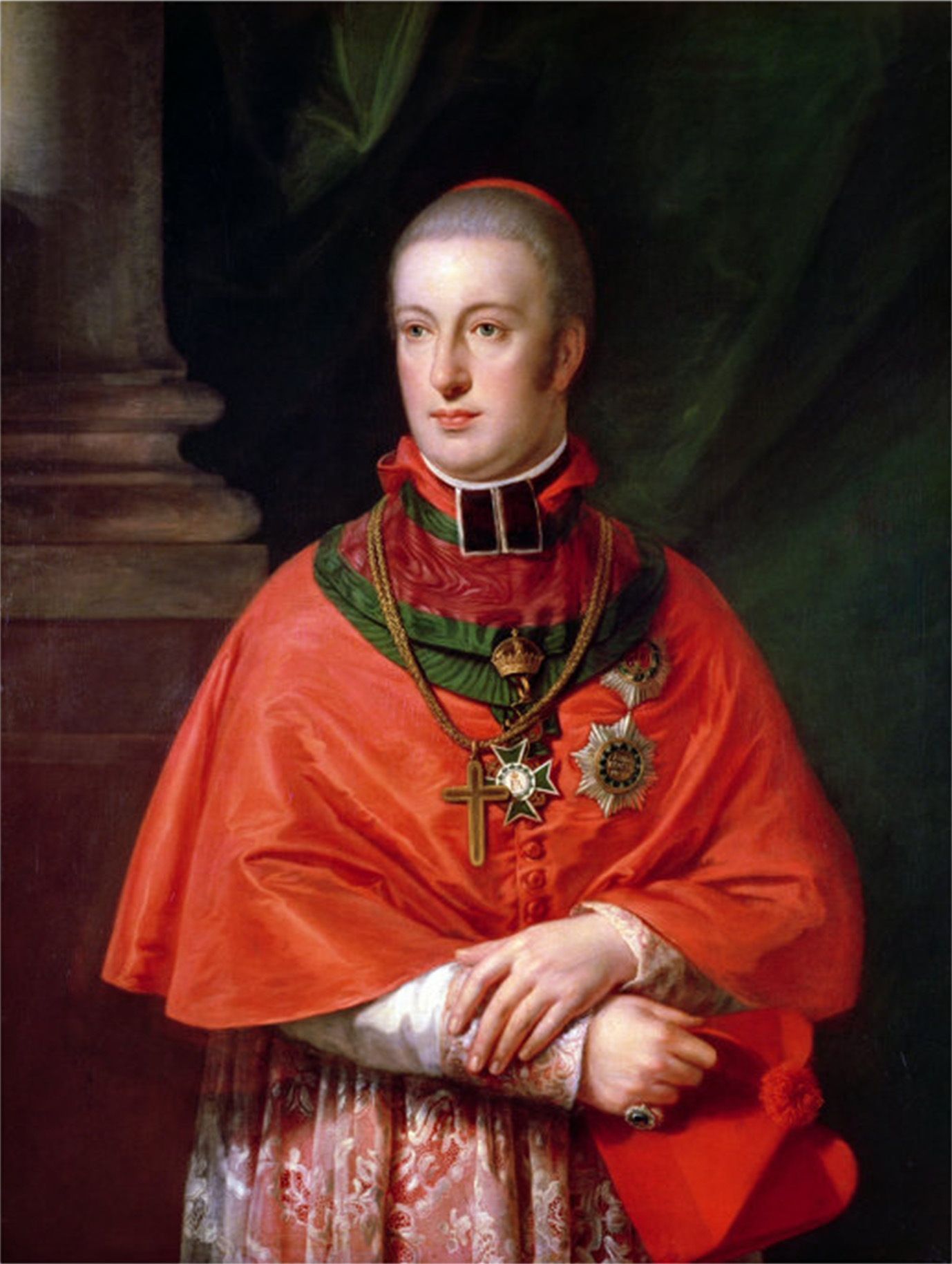
- Portrait by Johann Baptist von Lampi, Vienna Museum
- Metropolis: Archdiocese of Olomouc
- See: Olomouc
- Installed: 24 March 1819
- Term ended: 24 July 1831
- Predecessor: Maria Thaddäus von Trautmannsdorff
- Successor: Ferdinand Maria Chotek von Chotkow
- Other post: Archduke of Austria
- Previous posts: Coadjutor of Anton Theodor von Colloredo-Waldsee-Mels, Archbishop of Olomouc (1805–1811)

Orders
- Ordination: 29 August 1819
- Consecration: 26 September 1819 by Sigismund Anton von Hohenwart
- Created cardinal: 4 June 1819 by Pope Pius VII
- Rank: Cardinal-Priest of S. Pietro in Montorio

Personal details
- Born: Rudolph Johann Joseph Rainier; 8 January 1788 Florence, Tuscany
- Died: 24 July 1831 (aged 43) Baden, Lower Austria
- Denomination: Roman Catholic
- Parents: Leopold II, Holy Roman Emperor (father); Infanta Maria Luisa of Spain (mother)
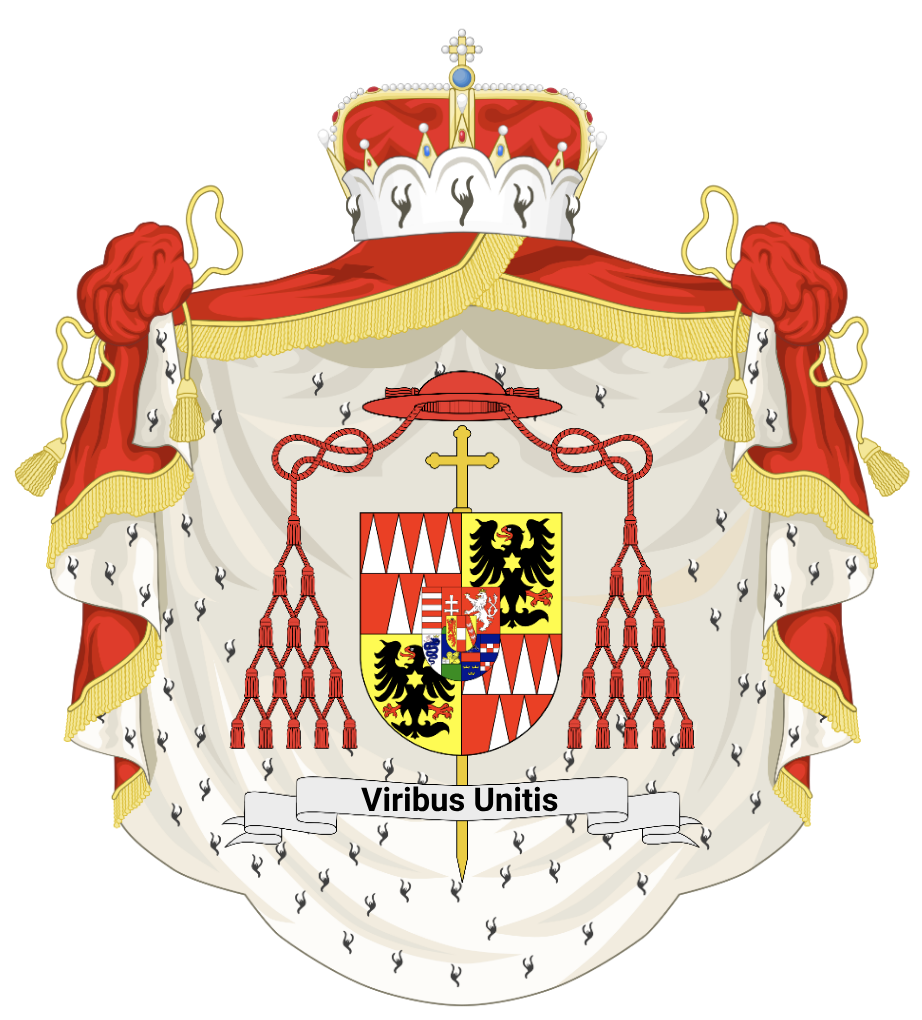
- Coat of arms

Rudolph Johann Joseph Rainier, Archduke of Austria, Prince Royal of Hungary and Bohemia, Cardinal-Archbishop of Olomouc (8 January 1788 – 24 July 1831), was a member of the House of Habsburg-Lorraine, and an Austrian clergyman and noble. He was consecrated as Archbishop of Olomouc (Olmütz) in 1819 and was created a cardinal that same year. Rudolph is known for his patronage of the arts, most notably as sponsor of Ludwig van Beethoven, who dedicated several of his works to him.

== Biography ==
Born in the Pitti Palace in Florence, Tuscany, he was the youngest son of Emperor Leopold II and Maria Luisa of Spain. In 1803 or 1804, Rudolph began taking lessons in piano and composition from Ludwig van Beethoven. The two became friends, and Rudolph became a supporter and patron of Beethoven; their meetings continued until 1824. Beethoven dedicated 14 compositions to Rudolph, including the Archduke Trio, the Hammerklavier Sonata, the Emperor Concerto and the Missa Solemnis. Piano Sonata No. 26 - Les Adieux ("The Farewells") was gifted to Rudolf just before his flight from Vienna with the imperial family on the occasion of the 1809 invasion by Napoleon. The movements are "Lebewohl", "Abwesenheit", and "Wiedersehen" ('farewell', 'absence', and 'reunion'). Rudolph dedicated one of his own compositions to Beethoven. The letters Beethoven wrote to Rudolph are today kept at the Gesellschaft der Musikfreunde in Vienna.

Franz Schubert and Ferdinand Ries also dedicated works to Rudolf.

On 24 March 1819, aged 31, Rudolph was appointed Archbishop of Olomouc in the present day Czech Republic but then known as Olmütz which was part of the Austrian Empire. He was made Cardinal-Priest of the titular church of S. Pietro in Montorio by Pope Pius VII on 4 June 1819. He was ordained a priest on 29 August 1819, and consecrated a bishop on 26 September.

In 1823–24, he was one of the 50 composers who composed a variation on a waltz by Anton Diabelli for Vaterländischer Künstlerverein. In Rudolph's case, the music was published anonymously, as by "S.R.D" (standing for Serenissimus Rudolfus Dux). He acquired a significant library of musical compositions, comprising over 18,000 works from 2,400 composers, now held by the Gesellschaft der Musikfreunde.

He died on 24 July 1831 of a cerebral hemorrhage in Baden bei Wien at the age of 43 and was interred in the Imperial Crypt in Vienna; his heart was buried in the crypt in Saint Wenceslas Cathedral in Olomouc.

== Ancestors ==
Ancestors of Archduke Rudolf of Austria

8. Leopold, Duke of Lorraine
4. Francis I, Holy Roman Emperor
9. Élisabeth Charlotte d'Orléans
2. Leopold II, Holy Roman Emperor
10. Charles VI, Holy Roman Emperor
5. Maria Theresa of Austria
11. Elisabeth Christine of Brunswick
1. Archduke Rudolf of Austria
12. Philip V of Spain
6. Charles III of Spain
13. Elisabeth of Parma
3. Maria Luisa of Spain
14. Augustus III of Poland
7. Maria Amalia of Saxony
15. Maria Josepha of Austria

== Sources ==
- Cardinal biographies
- http://www.catholic-hierarchy.org/bishop/bhabs.html

Catholic Church titles
Preceded by Maria Tadeáš von Trauttmansdorf-Wiensberg	Archbishop of Olomouc; 1819–1831	Succeeded by Ferdynand Maria von Chotek
