= Domenico Pignatelli di Belmonte =

Italian Cardinal

His Eminence Domenico Pignatelli di Belmonte C.R.
- Archbishop of Palermo
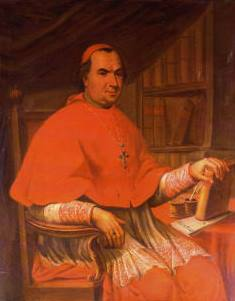
- Church: Roman Catholic Church
- Archdiocese: Palermo
- See: Palermo
- Appointed: 29 March 1802
- Term ended: 5 February 1803
- Predecessor: Filippo López y Rojo
- Successor: Raffaele Mormile
- Previous posts: Superior General of the Theatines (1777-82); Bishop of Caserta (1782-1802)

Orders
- Ordination: 22 September 1753
- Consecration: 3 March 1782 by Innocenzo Conti
- Created cardinal: 9 August 1802 by Pope Pius VII
- Rank: Cardinal-Priest

Personal details
- Born: Domenico Pignatelli di Belmonte; 19 November 1730 Naples, Kingdom of Naples
- Died: 5 February 1803 (aged 72) Palermo, Kingdom of Sicily
- Parents: Domenico Pignatelli y Americh; Anna Francesca Pinelli Ravaschiero

Styles of Domenico Pignatelli di Belmonte
- Reference style: His Eminence
- Spoken style: Your Eminence
- Informal style: Cardinal
- See: Not Announced

Domenico Pignatelli di Belmonte (19 November 1730 – 5 February 1803) was an Italian Cardinal of the Roman Catholic Church.

Pignatelli and Pinelli Arms, coronet of a Prince of the Holy Roman Empire: Lecce Cathedral

== Biography ==
Prince Don Domenico Pignatelli di Belmonte was born on 19 November 1730 in Naples, Italy, the son of Princess Donna Anna Francesca, Princess of Belmonte in her own right and 1st Princess of the Holy Roman Empire (since 1726) by marriage. His father was Prince Don (Giuseppe) Antonio Pignatelli y Aymerich, who was also 2nd Marquess of San Vicente and 3rd Marquess of Argençola, and General of the Imperial Cavalry.

Domenico Pignatelli di Belmonte was ordained priest as a member of the Congregation of Clerks Regular of the Divine Providence (The Theatines), as Father Domenico Pignatelli on 22 September 1753. He was appointed Lector of Sacred Canons in the House of Studies of SS. Apostoli, Naples, on 12 December 1755. Thereafter he was appointed Secretary to the Superior General, then Superior of SS. Apostoli, later Procurator General, and finally Co-Adjutor to Father Antonio Francesco Vezzosi, the Superior General of the Theatine Order, on 31 May 1774. He was himself appointed Superior General on 22 April 1777. He was also appointed as Examiner of those appointed to Ecclesiastical Chairs.

In his Episcopate, he was elected Bishop of Caserta and chosen as Assistant to the papal throne on 25 February 1782. He was subsequently consecrated Bishop on 3 March 1782 in Rome, at the church of San Silvestro al Monte, by Cardinal Innocenzo Conti, Secretary of the Chancery of Apostolic Briefs, who was assisted in the ceremony by Girolamo Volpi, Titular Archbishop of Neocesarea, and by François de Pierre de Bernis, Titular Bishop of Apollonia, Vicar General of Albi. Bishop Domenico was also General of the Congregation of Clerks Regular of the Divine Providence (The Theatines).

He was promoted to the Metropolitan See of Palermo and Monreale on 29 March 1802, and received the pallium on the same day.

In addition to Cardinal-Archbishop, he was Viceroy of Sicily, 1802-1803 (styled as 'President of the Kingdom and Captain General'), by King Ferdinand IV.

He was created a Cardinal Priest in the consistory of 9 August 1802, and received the red biretta on 5 December 1802, in the chapel of the Seminary of Palermo. He was created a cardinal in place of Paulo Luis Silva, assessor of the Supreme Sacred Congregation of the Roman and Universal Inquisition, who had been created and reserved In pectore in the consistory of 23 February 1801 and died before his name was published.

Cardinal Domenico died on 5 February 1803, before receiving the red hat and title of his cardinalate, and was buried in the church of the Congregation of Clerks Regular of the Divine Providence (The Theatines), in Palermo. He died at the age of 71, of complications from gout.
