= Antonio Felice Zondadari =

His Eminence Antonio Felice Zondadari
- Archbishop of Siena
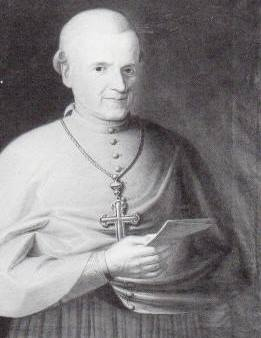
- Church: Catholic Church
- Archdiocese: Siena
- Appointed: 1 June 1795
- Term ended: 13 April 1823
- Predecessor: Alfonso Marsili
- Successor: Giuseppe Mancini
- Other posts: Cardinal-Priest of Santa Balbina (1801-1823)
- Previous posts: Bishop of Adana (1785-1795)

Orders
- Ordination: 16 March 1782
- Consecration: 19 December 1785 by Francesco Saverio de Zelada
- Created cardinal: 23 February 1801 by Pope Pius VII
- Rank: Cardinal-Priest

Personal details
- Born: 14 January 1740 Siena, Tuscany
- Died: 13 April 1823 (aged 83) Siena, Tuscany

Antonio Felice Zondadari, also known as Anton Felice Chigi Zondadari (14 January 1740 – 13 April 1823) was an Italian prelate of the Catholic Church.

He is not to be confused with his uncle, also a cardinal, Antonio Felice Zondadari the elder (1665–1737).

== Biography ==
Anton Felice Chigi Zondadari was born in Siena on 14 January 1742. He was ordained a priest on 16 March 1782. On 19 December 1785 he was appointed titular archbishop of Adana. He received his episcopal consecration on 19 December from Cardinal Francesco Saverio de Zelada.

In 1786 he was appointed Apostolic Nuncio in Brussels or perhaps more precisely the ecclesiastical superior of the Mission sui iuris of Batavia, with responsibility for the Austrian Netherlands.

He was expelled on the orders of Emperor Joseph II the following year, as he was suspected of supporting the Brabant Revolution.

He became Secretary of Congregation of the Propagation of the Faith on 30 March 1789 and held that position until August 1795.

Zondadari was appointed Archbishop of Siena on 1 June 1795.

He received Pope Pius VI in Siena when he fled from Rome, expelled by the pro-French revolutionaries.

Zondadari was made a cardinal by Pope Pius VII during the consistory of 23 February 1801 and given the title of Cardinal Priest of Santa Balbina.

Zondadari was among the few of his peers (14 in all) admitted by Napoleon to his wedding ceremony with Marie Louise of Austria in the Louvre on 2 April 1810.

Zondadari died suddenly in Siena on 13 April 1823 and his body was entombed in the Cathedral of Siena.
