= Giulio Gabrielli the Younger =

Italian cardinal

His Eminence Giulio Gabrielli
- Cardinal Secretary of State
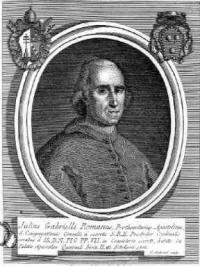
- Church: Roman Catholic Church
- Appointed: 26 March 1808
- Term ended: 18 June 1808 (Removed by Napoleon)
- Predecessor: Filippo Casoni
- Successor: Bartolomeo Pacca (as Pro-Secretary of State)
- Other post: Cardinal-Protector of San Lorenzo in Lucina (1819–1822)
- Previous posts: Cardinal-Priest of San Tommaso in Parione (1801-1819); Bishop of Senigallia (1808-1816); Prefect of the Sacred Congregation of the Tridentine Council (1814-1820)

Orders
- Ordination: 23 March 1800
- Consecration: 11 January 1808 by Pope Pius VII
- Created cardinal: 23 February 1801 by Pope Pius VII
- Rank: Cardinal-Bishop

Personal details
- Born: Giulio Gabrielli; 20 July 1748 Rome, Papal States
- Died: 26 September 1822 (aged 74) Albano Laziale, Papal States

Giulio Gabrielli ("The younger"; 20 July 1748 – 26 September 1822) was an Italian cardinal in the Catholic Church. He spent most of his career in the Roman Curia.

Gabrielli was born in Rome to a princely family originally from Gubbio in the Papal States (nowadays in Umbria). His parents were marquis (later prince) Angelo Gabrielli and marquise Caterina Trotti-Bentivoglio, the most beautiful woman in the mid-18th century Rome, celebrated by Giacomo Casanova as the "marquise G.".

He studied law at the Sapienza University of Rome and, while still a layman, was appointed Protonotary Apostolic, Relator of the Sacred Congregation of the Good Government and, in 1787, Secretary of the Sacred Congregation of the Tridentine Council. He was ordained priest only on 23 March 1800, but less than one year later Pope Pius VII elevated him to cardinal, in the consistory of 23 February 1801. He received the red hat on February 26 and the title of cardinal priest of San Tommaso in Parione on 20 July. On 11 January 1808, he was consecrated bishop of Senigallia (in the Papal States) by Pius VII, in his private chapel.

On 26 March 1808, following the retirement of cardinal Filippo Casoni, Pius VII appointed Gabrielli Cardinal Secretary of State. Considered the most loyal guardian of the Church and the staunchest opponent of Napoleon and general de Miollis, on 16 June he was arrested by the French troops in his office at the Quirinal Palace in Rome and forced to move to Senigallia; he was later deported to Novara, and then to Milan. Two days after the arrest, he was replaced by cardinal Bartolomeo Pacca as pro-Secretary of State.

In 1809 Gabrielli was eventually moved to France and confined in Sedan. In 1810 he was among the thirteen cardinals who refused to attend the ceremony of the marriage between Napoleon and Marie Louise of Austria, and were thus severely punished by the Emperor and forced to abandon their scarlet garments (they were consequently known as the "Black Cardinals"). In 1813 he joined Pius VII in his exile at Fontainebleau and was one of the most influential personalities of the reconstituted papal court. The following year, in an attempt to subtract the pope from the influence of the cardinal, Napoleon decided to confine him again at Le Vigan, in the Cévennes region of southern France: here he was given hospitality by the vicomte Henri d'Alzon, the father of Fr. Emmanuel d'Alzon.

In April 1814, after the abdication of Napoleon, he was liberated and returned to Rome, where the Pope appointed him Secretary of the Chancery of Apostolic Briefs and Prefect of the Sacred Congregation of the Tridentine Council (26 July 1814). In 1816 he resigned from the pastoral government of the diocese of Senigallia. In 1819 he became Cardinal Protoprete (Protopriest) and consequently opted for the titulus of San Lorenzo in Lucina, that two centuries earlier had belonged to his forebear and namesake Giulio Gabrielli the Elder (1604–1677). In 1820 he resigned from Prefect of the Congregation of the Council and was appointed Pro-Datary of His Holiness. He also served as Cardinal Protector of the Order of Saint Augustine.

Cardinal Gabrielli was considered as one of the most likely successors to Pius VII at the guide of the Church but predeceased the Pope by less than one year. After a short illness, he died at his country villa in Albano Laziale, in the Castelli Romani area, in late Summer of 1822. His body was exposed in the Palace of the Datary, and later in the basilica of Santa Maria sopra Minerva, where his funeral took place on 1 October. He was buried in the Gabrielli chapel in that same church.

== Family ==
His brother, Prince Pietro Gabrielli (1746–1824) was a notable supporter of Napoleon and during the French occupation of the Papal States served as deputy mayor (maire adjoint) of Rome. Pietro’s son, Prince Mario Gabrielli (1773–1841), was married in 1815 to Charlotte Bonaparte, elder daughter of Lucien Bonaparte and niece of the Emperor.

Catholic Church titles
Preceded by Filippo Casoni	Cardinal Secretary of State; 26 March 1808 – 17 May 1814	Succeeded by Ercole Consalvi
