= Antonio Doria Pamphili =

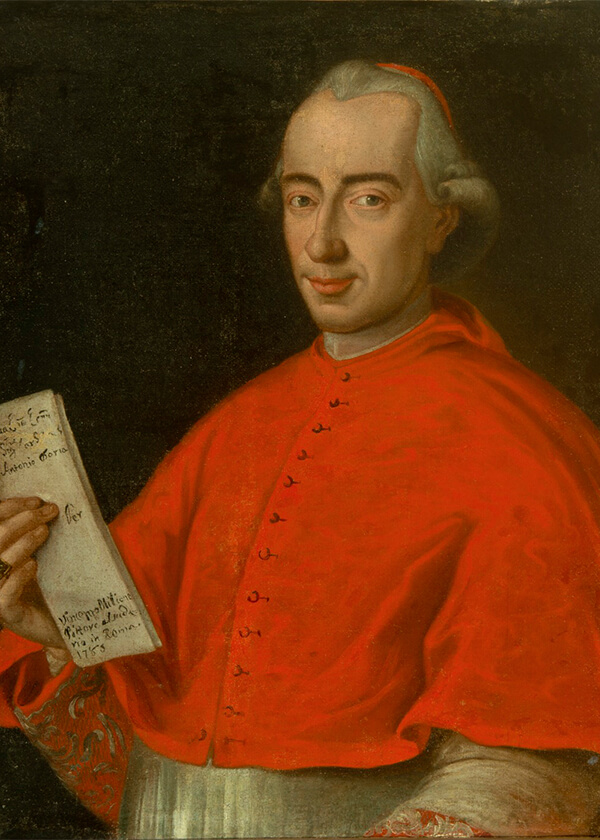
Antonio Doria Pamphili

Antonio Doria Pamphilj (March 28, 1749 in Naples – January 31, 1821 in Rome) was an Italian Cardinal from a prominent Neapolitan noble family of Genoese heritage. As protodeacon, he announced the election of cardinal Barnaba Chiaramonti election at the end of the conclave of 1800 as Pope Pius VII.He was also a Brother of Cardinal Giuseppe Pampili.
