= Maria Thaddäus von Trautmannsdorff =

Austrian cardinal

His Eminence Maria Thaddäus von Trautmannsdorff
- Cardinal, Archbishop of Olomouc
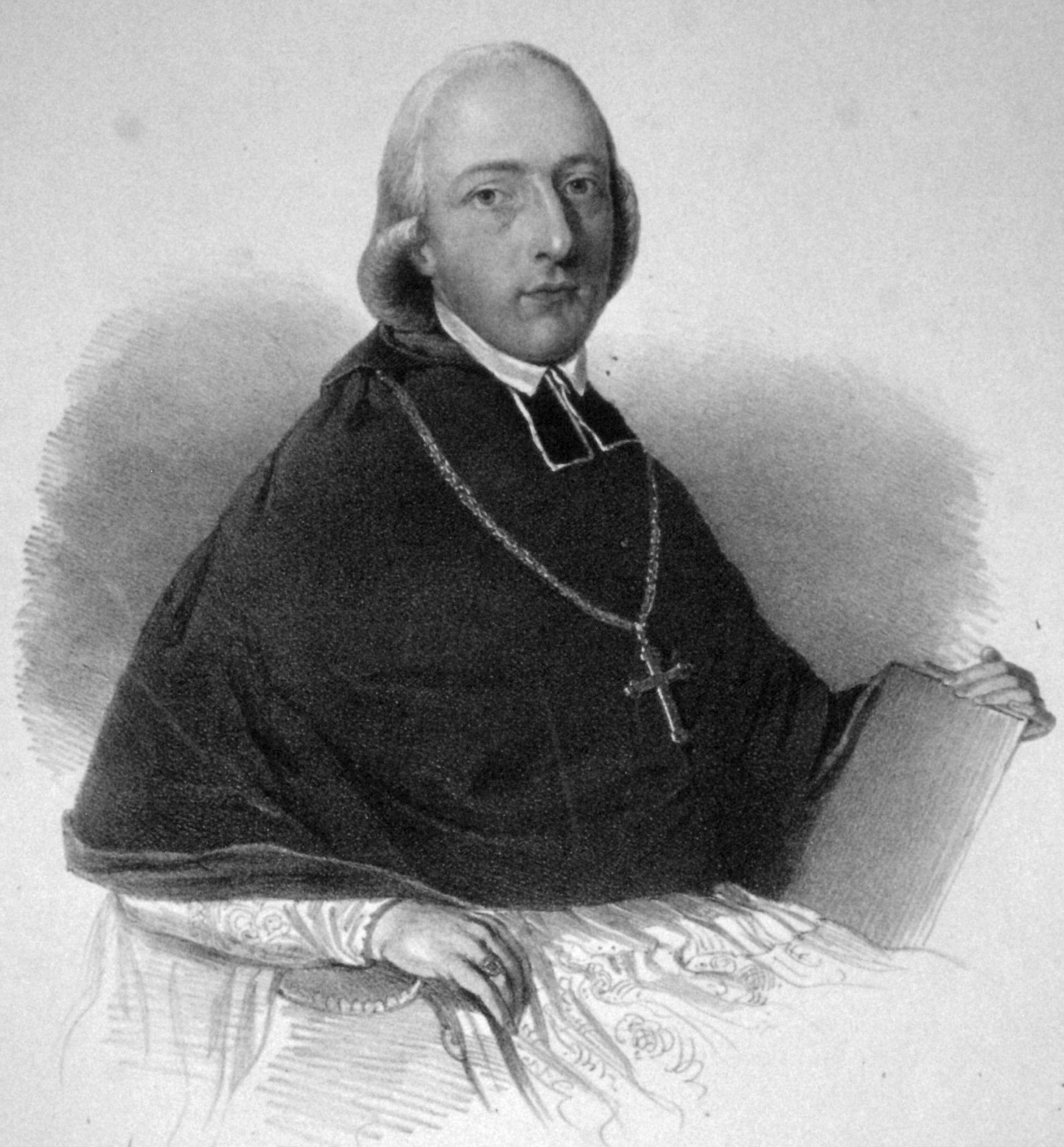
- Lithograph by Faustin Herr
- Church: Roman Catholic Church
- See: Olomouc
- Appointed: 23 September 1816
- Predecessor: Antonín Theodor Count of Colloredo-Waldsee
- Successor: Archduke Rudolf of Austria
- Other post: Bishop of the Roman Catholic Diocese of Hradec Králové

Orders
- Created cardinal: 23 September 1816 by Pope Pius VII

Personal details
- Born: 28 May 1761 Graz
- Died: 20 January 1819 (aged 57) Vienna
- Buried: Olomouc
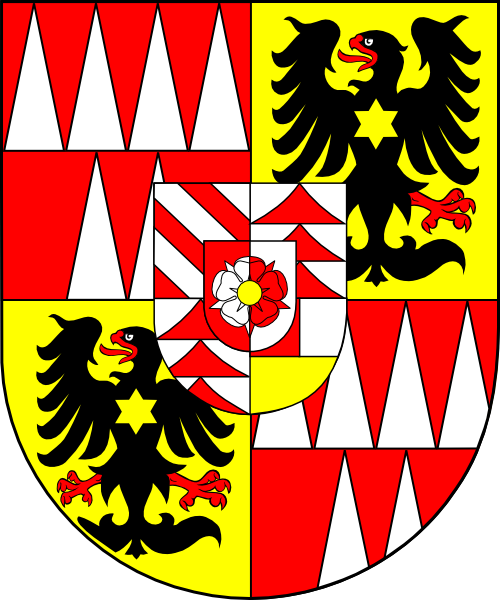
- Coat of arms

Styles of Maria Thaddäus von Trautmannsdorff
- Reference style: His Eminence
- Spoken style: Your Eminence
- Informal style: Cardinal
- See: Olomouc

Maria Thaddäus von Trautmannsdorff (28 May 1761 – 20 January 1819) was a cardinal of the Roman Catholic Church.

== Early life ==
He was born on 28 May 1761 in Graz as son of Imperial Count Weikhard Joseph von Trauttmansdorff-Weinsberg (1711-1788) of the Trauttmansdorff family and Countess Maria Anna von Wurmbrand-Stuppach (1733-1807).

== Ecclesiastical career ==
He was ordained as Bishop of Hradec Králové on 8 September 1795. On 26 November 1811 he was elected Archbishop of Olomouc. Due to the imprisonment of Pope Pius VII by Napoleon Bonaparte, papal approval of this decision did not take place until 15 March 1814. On 23 September 1816 he was appointed cardinal.

He died in Vienna on 20 January 1819 and was buried in Olomouc.
