= Maximilian Reichsgraf von Hamilton =

German Prince-Bishop

- Prince-Bishop of Olomouc
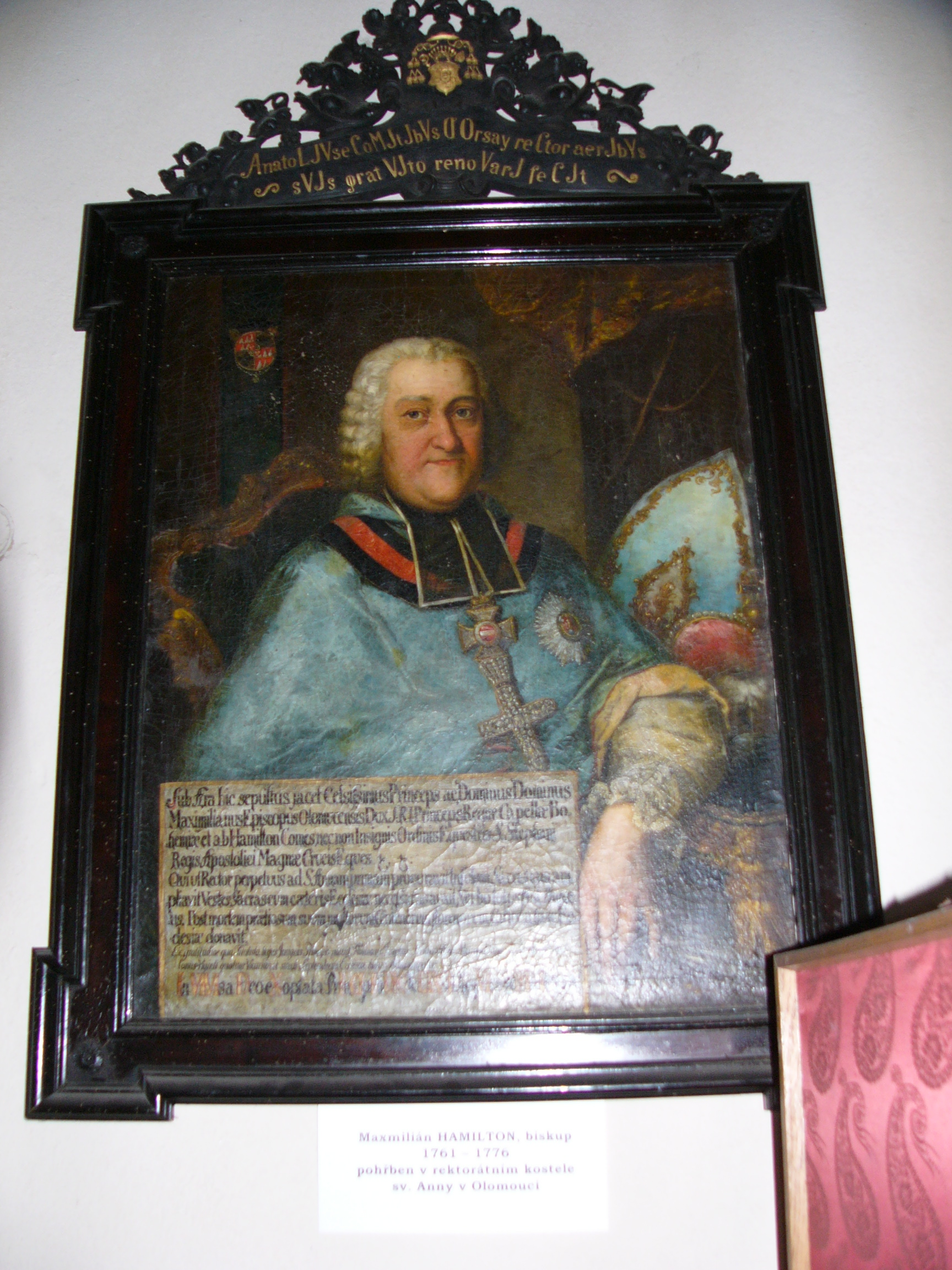
- Church: Roman Catholic Church
- See: Olomouc
- Predecessor: Leopold Friedrich Reichsgraf von Egkh und Hungersbach
- Successor: Antonín Theodor Colloredo-Waldsee

Personal details
- Born: 17 March 1714; Munich
- Died: 31 October 1776 (aged 62); Kroměříž
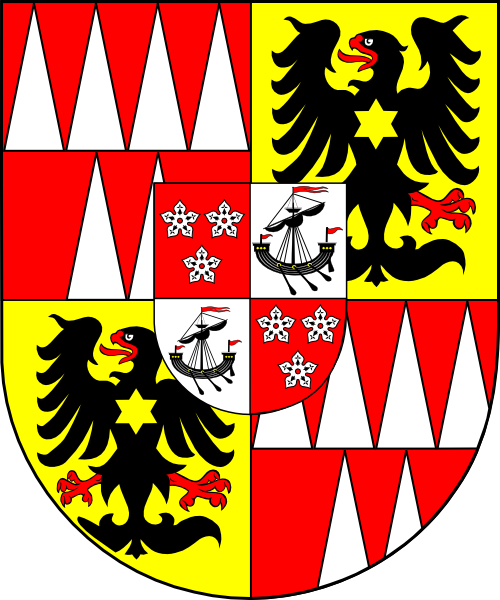
- Coat of arms

Furstbischof Maximilian, Reichsgraf von Hamilton (17 March 1714 – 31 October 1776) was a Prince-Bishop of Olomouc, then in the Holy Roman Empire, now in present-day Czech Republic.

== Family ==
Hamilton's family originally came from the Kingdom of Scotland, where his great-great-grandfather was James Hamilton, 1st Earl of Abercorn. Hamilton's grandfather was on the council of the Elector of Bavaria, was the Landvogt to the Margrave of Burgau, and also a chamberlain to the Holy Roman Emperor. He was given in 1698 the imperial title of count of Neuburg. Hamilton's parents were Julius Francis Hamilton, Reichsgraf von Neuburg, and Countess Maria Ernestina von Starhemberg.

== Life ==
Hamilton was born in Munich on 17 March 1714. Educated at Ettal Abbey, Hamilton graduated in 1738 from the Sapienza in Rome. After his ordination in 1738 he was pastoral work and in 1747 canon of Olomouc, in 1751 rector of St. Anne's Chapel at the Cathedral of Olomouc and 1758 was appointed vicar general. After the death of Prince-Bishop Leopold Friedrich von Egkh and Hungersbach, he was elected as his successor by the cathedral chapter of Olomouc. He died in Kroměříž on 31 October 1776.

He was the founder of the village of Hamiltony (now part of Vyškov).
