= Antonín Theodor Colloredo-Waldsee =

Austrian cardinal

His Eminence Antonín Theodor Colloredo-Waldsee
- Cardinal, Archbishop of Olomouc
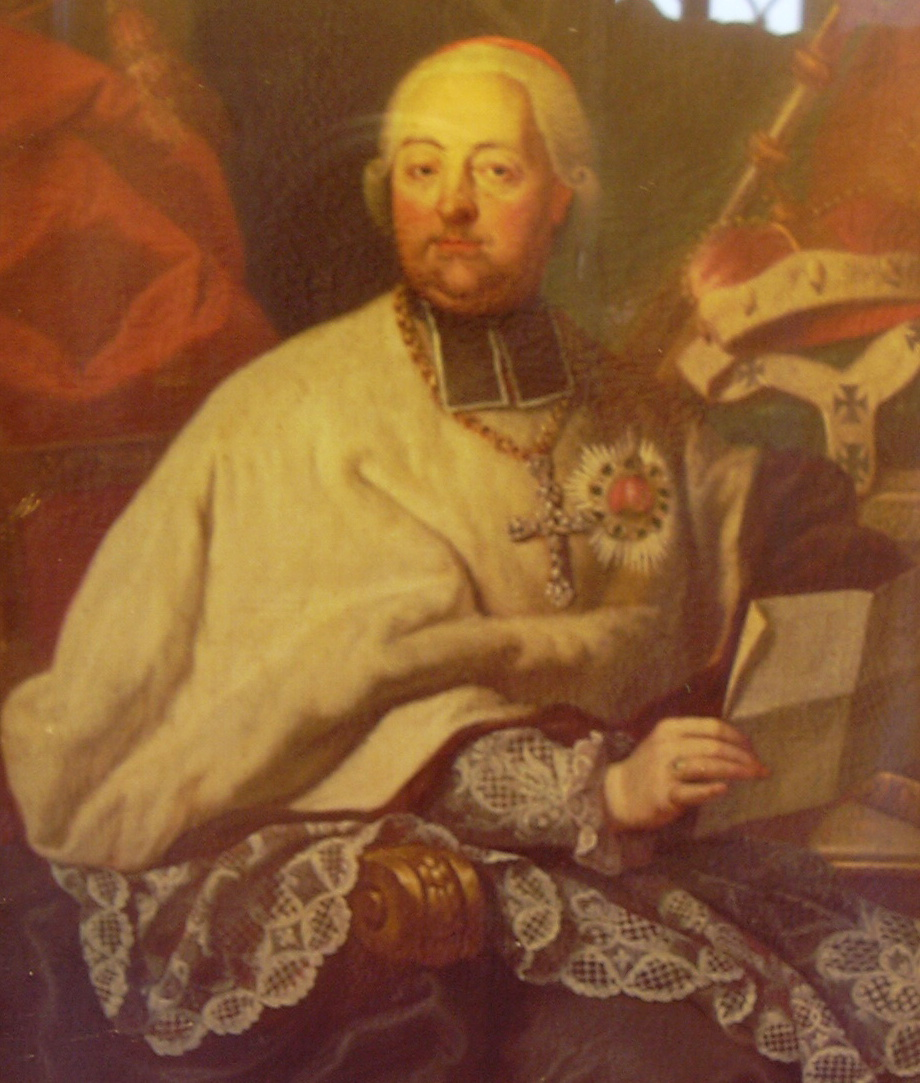
- Church: Roman Catholic Church
- See: Olomouc
- Predecessor: Maximilian Reichsgraf von Hamilton
- Successor: Maria Thaddäus von Trautmannsdorff

Orders
- Consecration: 17 May 1778 by Hieronymus Joseph Franziskus von Colloredo
- Created cardinal: 17 January 1803 by Pope Pius VII

Personal details
- Born: 17 July 1729 Vienna
- Died: 12 November 1811 (aged 82) Kroměříž
- Education: University of Padua
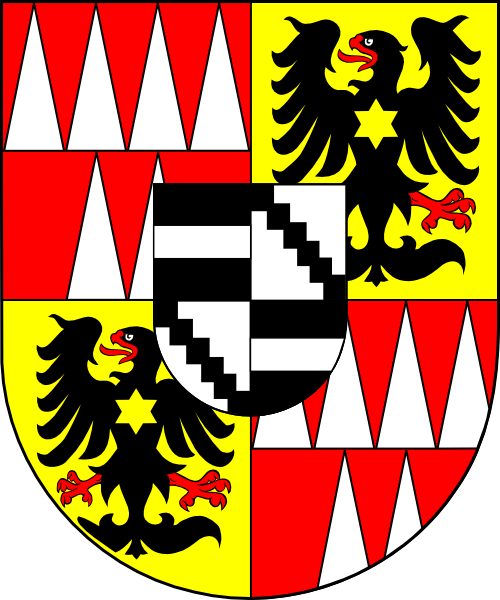
- Coat of arms

Styles of Antonín Theodor Colloredo-Waldsee
- Reference style: His Eminence
- Spoken style: Your Eminence
- Informal style: Cardinal
- See: Olomouc

Antonín Theodor von Colloredo-Waldsee (also: Colloredo-Waldsee-Melz or Colloredo-Melz und Waldsee) (17 July 1729 – 12 November 1811) was a cardinal of the Roman Catholic Church.

== Biography ==
Antonín was born on 29 June 1729 in Vienna as the son of Count Lodovico Colloredo-Waldesee Mels (1698–1767) and Princess Eleonore Gonzaga di Vescovato (1699–1779). He obtained his utroque iure at the University of Padua on 3 March 1752.

He was ordained as a priest on 20 August 1758 in Olomouc and was elected its bishop on 6 October 1777. On 5 December 1777 he was promoted Archbishop of Olomouc. He was consecrated at the Salzburg Cathedral on 17 May 1778 by Hieronymus Joseph Franziskus von Colloredo. In 1790, he participated in the Diet of Frankfurt. He was recommended to the cardinalate at the behest of Emperor Francis I, and was created cardinal on 17 January 1803 by Pope Pius VII. He died on 12 September 1811 in Kroměříž, where he is buried at the cathedral of Saint Moritz.
