= Beltrame (disambiguation) =

Beltrame is an Italian name. It may refer to:

- Beltrame, a traditional character of the Italian commedia dell'arte
- Arnaud Beltrame, a lieutenant colonel in the French National Gendarmerie, killed during a hostage crisis
- Beltrame di Milano, pen name of Niccolò Barbieri, an Italian actor and writer
- Beltrame Feragut, a French composer
- Daniel Beltrame, an Australian footballer
- Fabiana Beltrame, a Brazilian rower
- Fabiano Beltrame, a Brazilian footballer
- Francisco Beltrame, a Uruguayan architect and minister
- Marco Beltrame, an Italian Baroque sculptor
- Marco Beltrame, an Italian ski jumper
- Sebastián Beltrame, a Uruguayan television presenter
- Séverine Brémond Beltrame, a French tennis player
- Stefano Beltrame, an Italian footballer
- Wesley Lopes Beltrame, a Brazilian footballer
