= Fête galante =

18th-century French formal party in parks

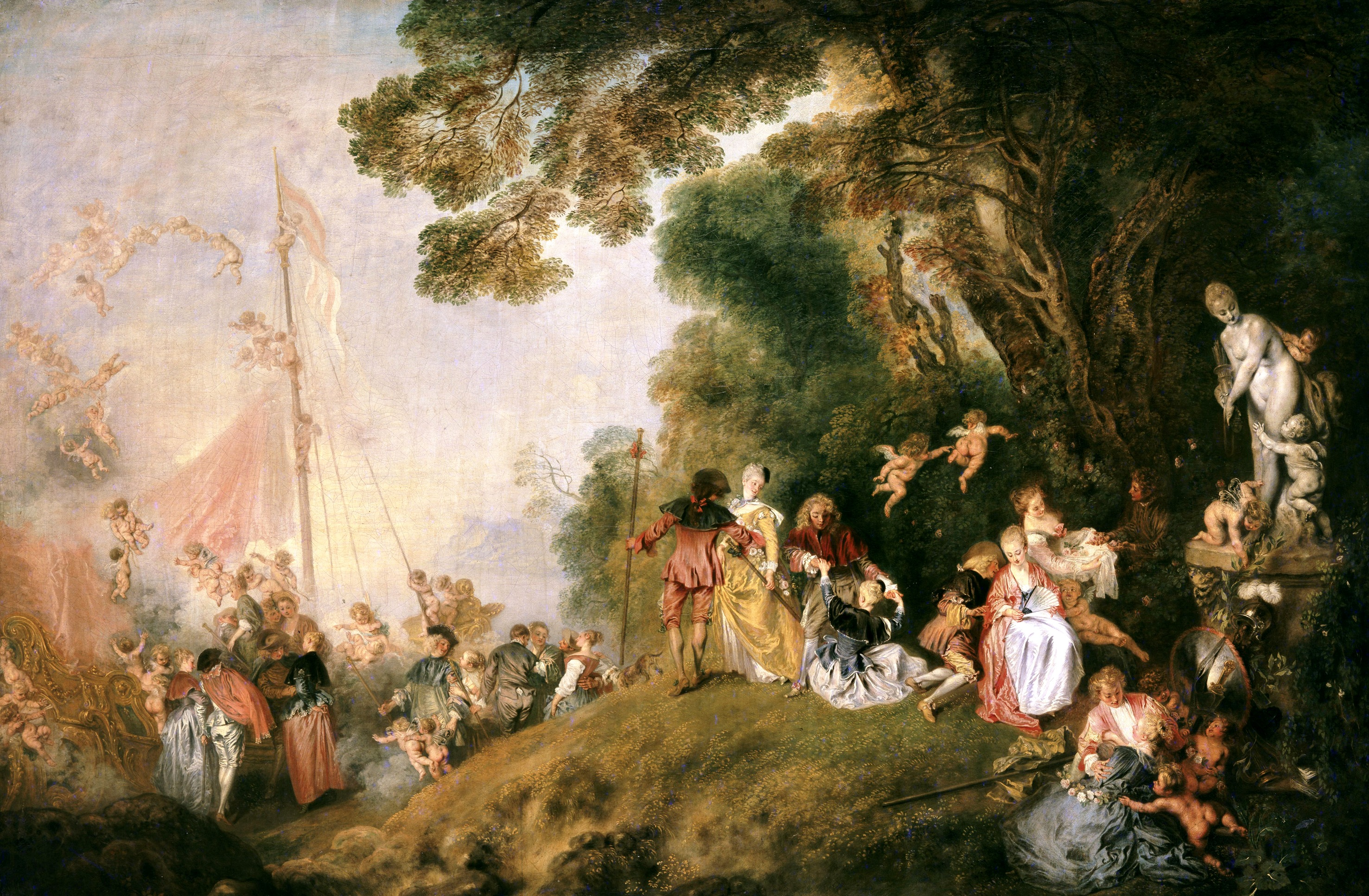
Antoine Watteau, Embarkation for Cythera, 1717

Fête galante (French pronunciation: [fɛt ɡalɑ̃t], lit. 'courtship party') is a category of painting specially created by the French Academy in 1717 to describe Antoine Watteau's (1684–1721) variations on the theme of the fête champêtre, which featured figures in ball dress or masquerade costumes disporting themselves amorously in parkland settings. When Watteau applied to join the French academy in 1717, there was no suitable category for his works, so the academy simply created one rather than reject his application. His reception piece was the Embarkation for Cythera, now in the Louvre.

Watteau wanted recognition from the government-appointed Academy of Painting and Sculpture. The Academy upheld the hierarchy of genres, ranking scenes of everyday life and portraits, the paintings most desired by private patrons, as lower than morally educational paintings illustrating history paintings, including allegories and scenes from mythology.

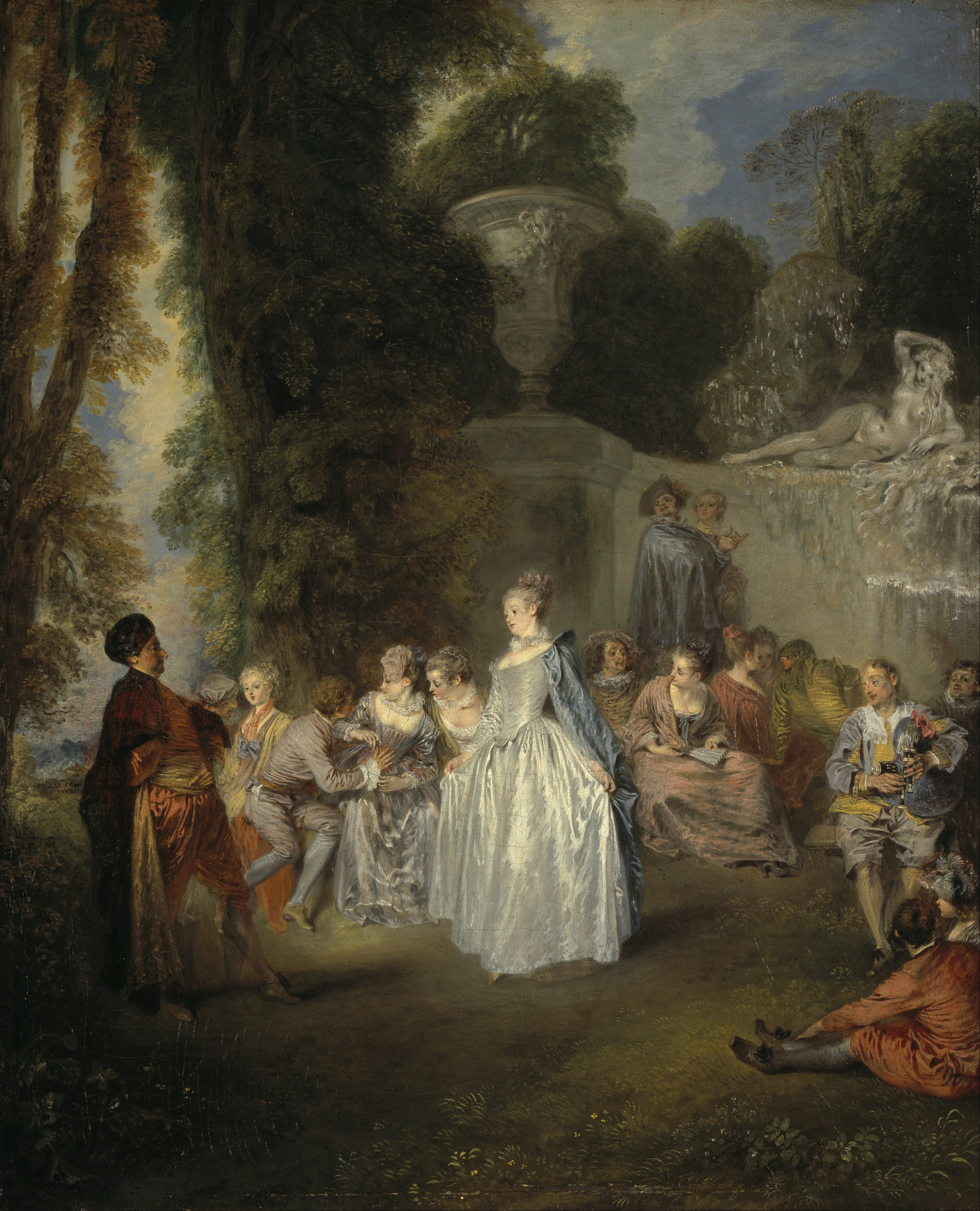
Fêtes Vénitiennes

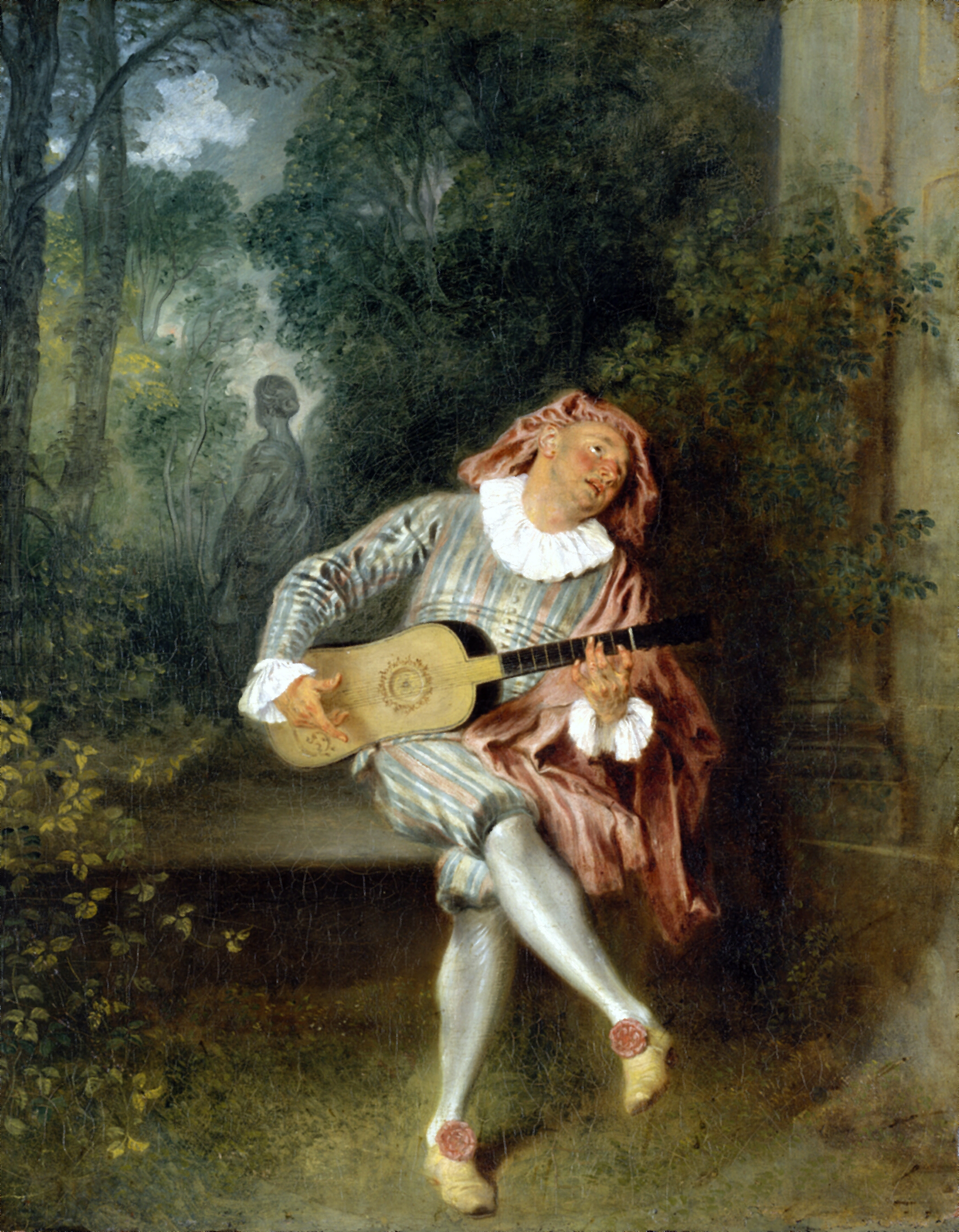
Mezzetin, 1718/9

== Wider context ==
Fête galante paintings are an important part of the Rococo period of art, which saw the focus of European arts move away from the hierarchical, standardized grandeur of the church and royal court and toward an appreciation for intimacy and personal pleasures. Nonetheless, the lush, outdoor settings of fête galante paintings were often borrowed from earlier paintings, especially from Venetian paintings of the 16th century and Dutch paintings of the 17th century.

The nineteenth century saw an anachronistic revival of such scenes in the costume genre depictions or scene galante paintings by, for example, Arturo Ricci and Jeanne Gougelet.

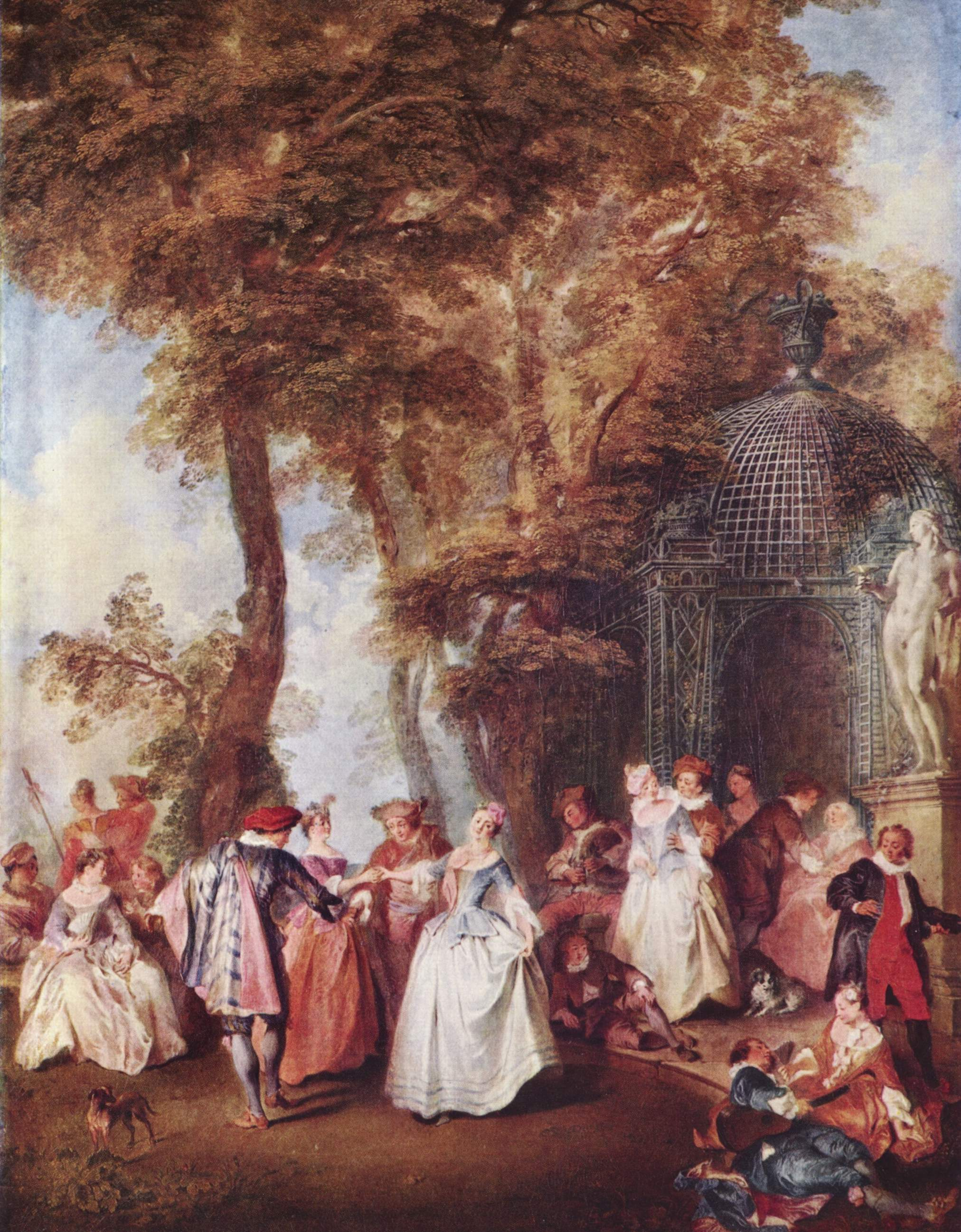
Nicolas Lancret, circa 1730

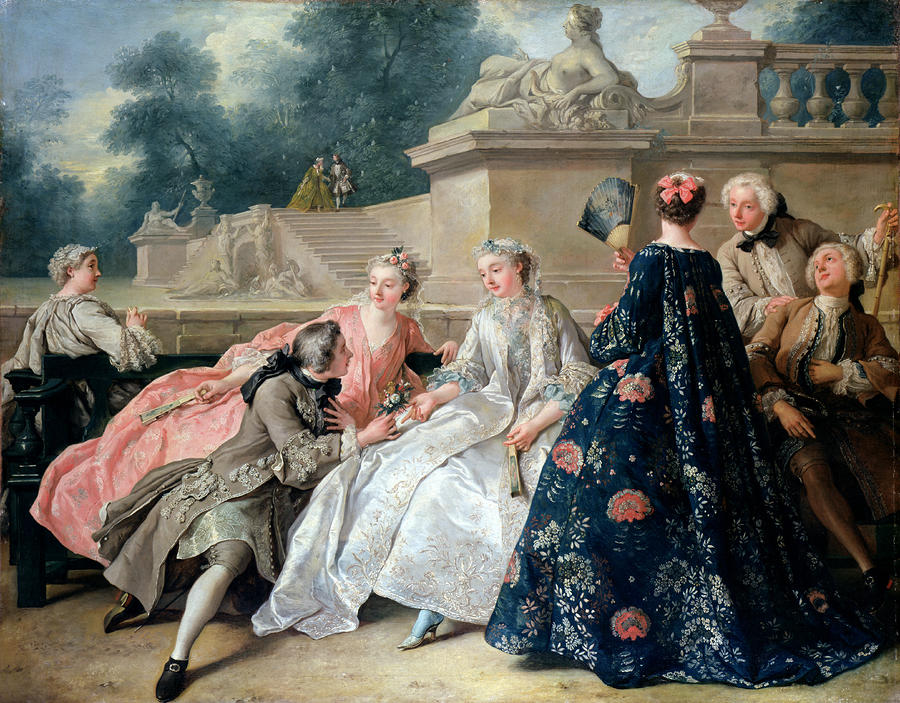
Jean François de Troy, The Declaration of Love, 1731.

== Examples ==
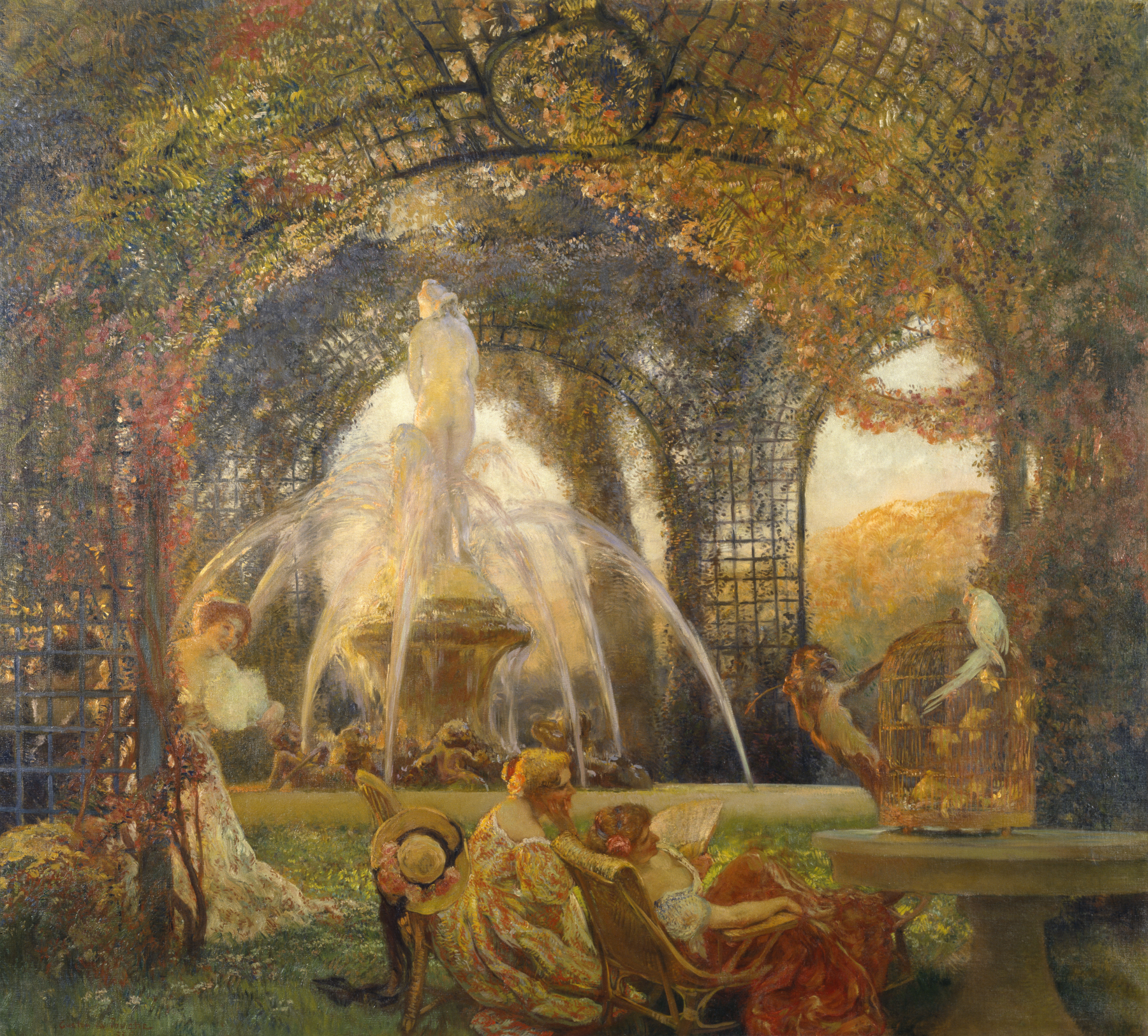
Gaston La Touche, The Arbor, 1906

- L'Accord Parfait (LACMA)- painted by Watteau between 1717 and 1718. A lovely young woman holds music for a homely old man playing a flute.
- Le Collation - by Pater. Gentry flirt and pick flowers before a female nude reclining on a mound shaped like a sea shell. The nude probably represents the goddess Venus.
- Danse dans le Parc - by Nicolas Lancret. Lavishly dressed courtiers dance before the statue of an heroic male nude. Male nudes were a favorite subject of history paintings, so this statue clearly is meant to elevate the dancers to "historical" status.
- Declaration of Love - painted by Jean François de Troy in 1731. De Troy's style is much more realistic than most. This painting was purchased by Frederick II of Prussia and hung in the Sans Souci palace.
- Les Deux Cousines - painted by Watteau between 1717 and 1718. Two women in white satin gowns are offered a red cape by a gallant young man. As in other fête galante paintings, Greco-Roman statues along the lake help elevate this genre scene to history painting status.
- Gardens of the Villa d'Este at Tivoli - painted by Fragonard. Classical architecture provides the backdrop for an outdoor meal and games.
- A Lady in a Garden Taking Coffee With Some Children - painted by Lancret about 1742. A woman seated next to a fountain in a lavish garden spoons some exotic coffee over to her children while two men- probably a husband and a servant- look on.
- Mezzetino - painted by Watteau between 1718 and 1720. Not technically a fête galante, this painting shows a pathetic figure from the Italian commedia dell'arte serenading a statue.
- A Pilgrimage to Cythera - painted by Watteau in 1717. Beautifully dressed aristocrats, attended by cherubs, visit an island supposedly dedicated to the ancient love goddess Cythera. This painting is often held up as the prototype of the fête galante.
- The Shepherds - painted by Watteau about 1716. This painting plays on a long tradition of aristocrats pretending to be rural shepherds, a tradition which flourished in the 18th century, most famously at the mock hamlet of Marie Antoinette.
- Venetian Pleasures - painted by Watteau between 1718 and 1719. Two dancers (the man in Arabian costume) perform for a crowd of onlookers in front of a statue of Venus. The bagpiper may be a self-portrait.
