= Perfect Harmony =

Perfect Harmony may refer to:

- Perfect Harmony (film), a 1991 Disney Channel film
- Perfect Harmony (musical), an a cappella stage musical
- Perfect Harmony (painting), a 1719 painting by Antoine Watteau
- Perfect Harmony (TV series), an American musical comedy series
- Perfect Harmony, a 1998 novel by Barbara Wood
- Perfect Harmony: The Whiffenpoofs in China, a 1985 documentary by Megan Callaway
