= The Surprise (Watteau) =

Painting by Antoine Watteau

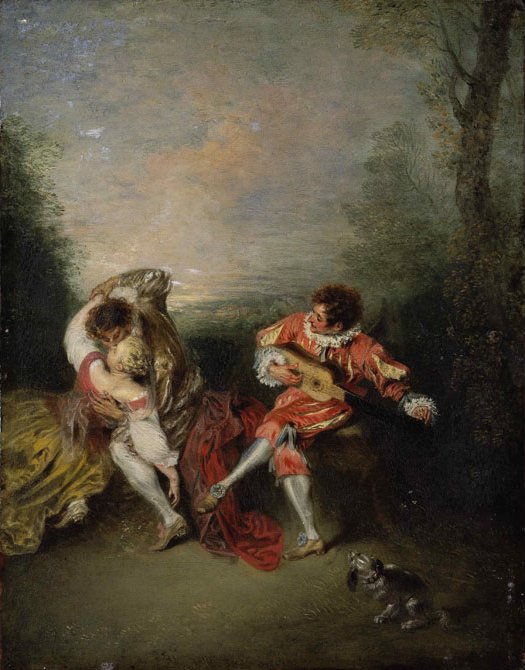
The Surprise (c. 1718) by Antoine Watteau

The Surprise (La Surprise) is an oil on panel painting by the French Rococo artist Antoine Watteau, created c. 1718, now held in the J. Paul Getty Museum, in Los Angeles. The painting depicts a male guitarist, dressed as Mezzetino, watching an embracing couple, with a small dog watching the whole scene; it notably exhibits Watteau's use of recurrent figures, as well as the influence of Flemish Baroque painting on his art.

The Surprise was a pendant to Perfect Harmony, now in the Los Angeles County Museum of Art; both works were originally owned by Watteau's friend Nicolas Hénin, but they were sold separately by his heir, who published an engraving of both works. Surprise then disappeared between 1770 and 1848 and again between 1848 and 2007. The original was rediscovered in March 2008 in a British country house and had been in that family's collection since 1848. It was sold for 15 million Euros at Christie's in London on 8 July 2008.

== Origin ==
L'Accord Parfait is in the museum in Los Angeles, but the Surprise has had several owners over the years and was last referenced in 1764 in the catalog of a collector who claimed to be its owner, the photo was known only from the picture and a copy which appeared in the Royal Collection at Buckingham Palace in London.

The original was rediscovered in March 2008, in the corner of a room in the country house of a British family, by an expert who came to appraise another work there. According to this expert, the painting had been in this family since 1848, who were unaware of its importance and value. Sold at auction on 8 July 2008 by Christie's in London, the Surprise reached a value of 15 million euros.
