= Pastoral Pleasure =

Painting by Antoine Watteau

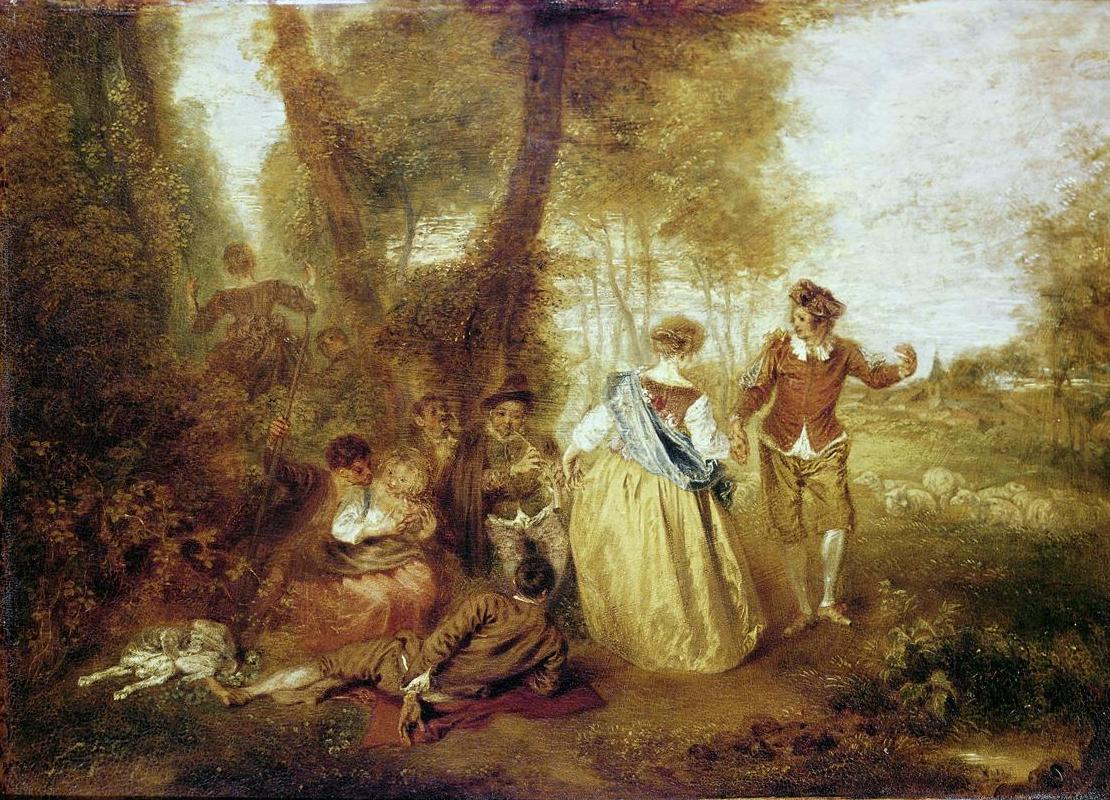
- Artist: Antoine Watteau
- Year: c. 1714-1716
- Medium: oil on canvas
- Dimensions: 31 cm × 44 cm (12 in × 17 in)
- Location: Musée Condé, Chantilly

Pastoral Pleasure (French - Le Plaisir pastoral) is a c. 1714–1716 fête galante painting by Antoine Watteau, now in the Musée Condé in Chantilly. Two other Watteau paintings survive with extremely similar compositions - the largest and most finished is The Shepherds, now in the Charlottenburg Palace, Berlin; another painting of that composition, once owned by Georges Wildenstein, seems to be a reworking of the Charlottenburg painting. Pierre Rosenberg argues that the Chantilly painting was an oil sketch for the Charlottenburg one. Three other copies of the Chantilly version appeared in 19th and 20th century auctions, but their locations are now unknown.

The Chantilly work belonged to Pierre-Jean Mariette, a great Watteau collector – it is mentioned as being in his possession from at least 1729, around which time Nicolas-Henri Tardieu made an engraving after it. On 1 February 1775 it was sold after Mariette's death. According to Edmond de Goncourt, it was resold in Paris on 11 May 1789, entering the marquis de Maison's collection, which was acquired in its entirety by the duc d'Aumale in 1868 whilst in exile in the United Kingdom. After moving back to France he hung the work in his château de Chantilly, where it still hangs in the Musée Condé.

== Analysis ==
It shows French aristocrats dressed as shepherds – one couple dances to the right and a young couple court each other on a balcony to the left. The painting also includes real peasants in simpler clothes and with simpler gestures, making it easier to distinguish between them and the aristocrats than in other Watteau paintings such as The Shepherds. Several details are directly inspired by Peter Paul Rubens's paintings: the musician, the man next to him, the shepherd embracing the woman next to him and the dog in the foreground.
