= Jeanne Gougelet =

French painter (b. 857)

Jeanne Gougelet (b. Metz 1857), full name Jeanne Marie Amélie Gougelet, was a French painter, illustrator, and watercolorist. Gougelet was known for portraits of elegantly dressed women and for genre paintings, especially in the category of fête galante. She was active in the 1880s, when a number of her works were accepted for exhibition at the Paris Salon. Her works are signed with the distinctive signature J. Gougelet, in which the final t has a tail making it a rotated doublet of the initial J.

== Early life and education ==
As the only daughter of an artillery lieutenant, Gougelet had a peripatetic upbringing. She was born in Metz, where her father was stationed before following his regiment to Grenoble in 1863, then to Chartres, then to Versailles in 1871, then to Soissons. He retired in 1881 and settled in Paris.

She began her artistic studies in 1878 under Alexandre Terral, a restorer of paintings at the Versailles museum. Later she was a student of Carolus-Duran and Jean-Jacques Henner in Paris.

== Career ==
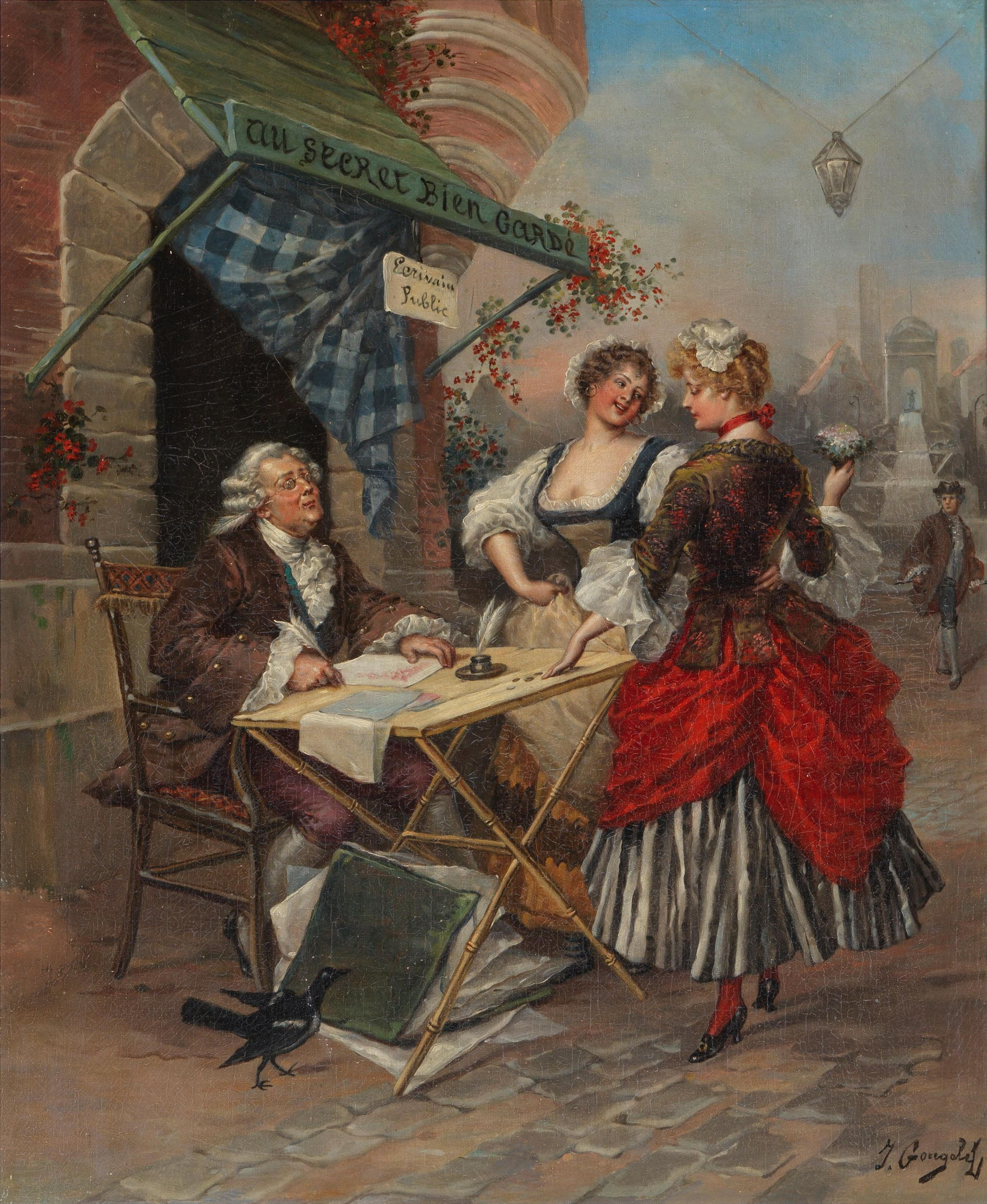
Au Secret bien gardé, private collection.

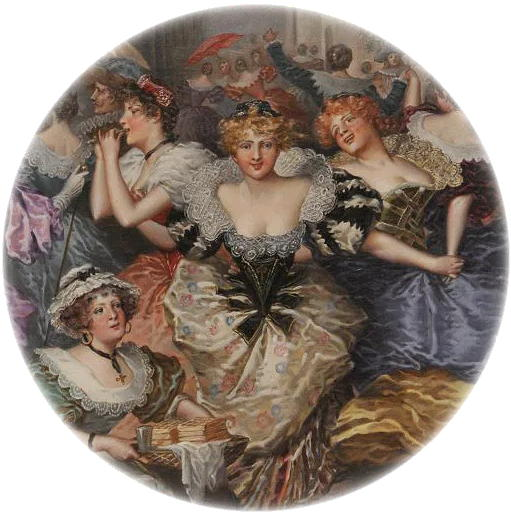
À la fête, 1898 (detail)

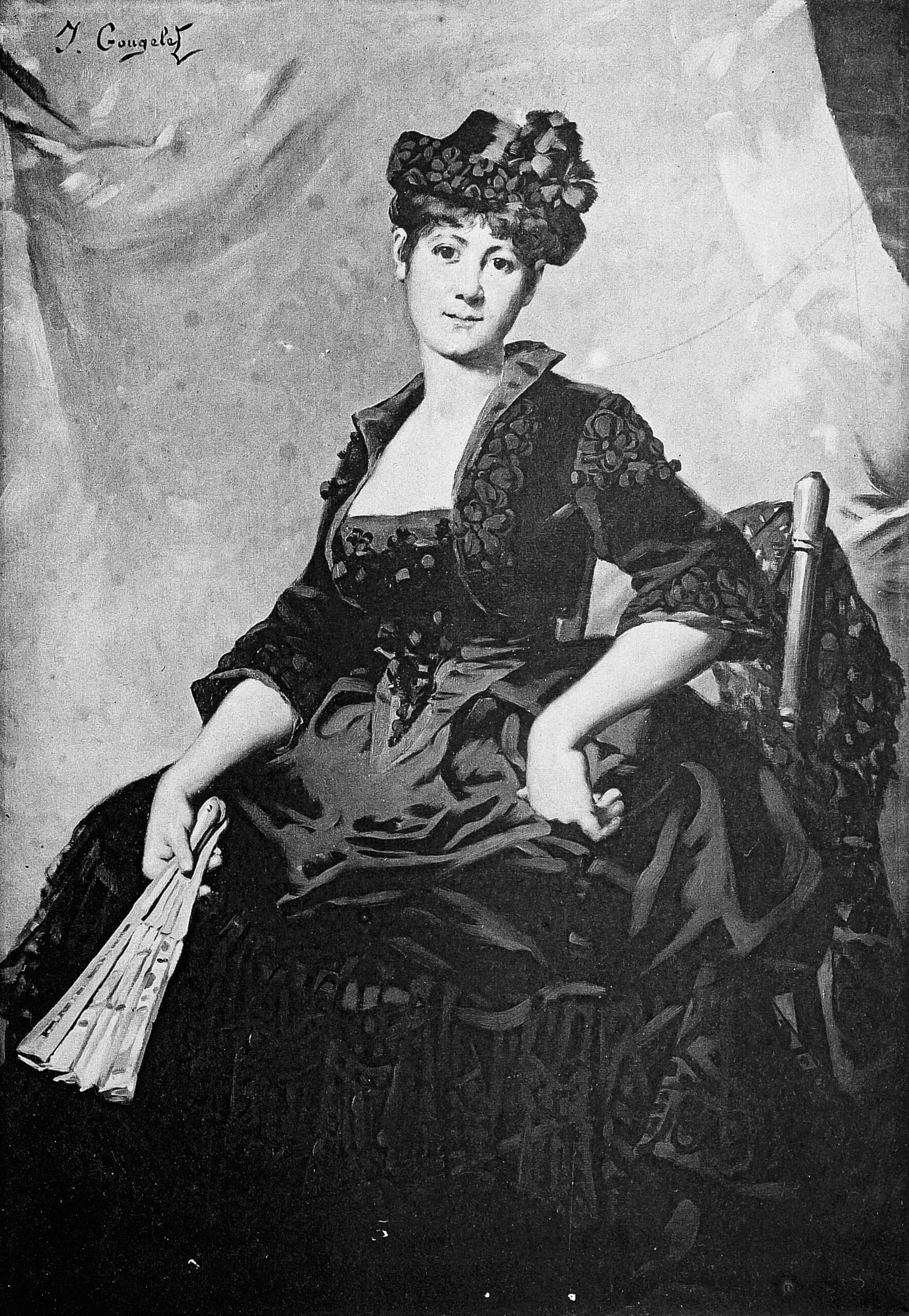
Reproduction of Madrid (1887); location of original unknown.

Gougelet showed a painting each year at the Paris Salon from 1883 to 1889 (excluding 1885). Her drawings were exhibited in the Exposition internationale de blanc et noir in Paris in 1885 and 1886. She also exhibited at Versailles (1883), Saint-Quentin (1884), Perpignan (1884, 1886), Amiens (1884), Rouen (1884), Bordeaux (1885), Dunkerque (1996), Épinal (1888), Nancy (1888), and Nice (1889). She also contributed an illustration to Victorien Sardou's preface to the theatrical publication Les Première Illustrées: Saison Théatricale 1883-1884.

Gougelet created genre paintings that depicted costumes and charms of a bygone era, as in Au Secret bien gardé (secrets well-kept), in which an ecrivain public (scribe for hire) appears to be writing a love letter for a customer unable to write it herself. Many of her works fit into the category of fête galante, depicting figures in uniform, ball dress or masquerade costumes disporting themselves amorously in elegant parkland settings or in raucous open-air festivals of "picturesque disorder and infectious enthusiasm."

Gougelet was also known for portraits of women in various modes of elegant dress. Like her teacher Henner, she displayed a penchant for redheads.

== Reception ==
Gougelet's works provoked mixed reactions. Her debut work at the Paris Salon, Une Japonaise in 1883, was praised by Ernest Depré in Journal des Artistes as "a fine painting with delicate and vibrant colors; spirited execution." Her Madrid in 1887 was deemed "a very personal work...it would be impossible to better render this dress of silk and black lace trimmed with red satin on the bodice and sleeves, or to put more fire into those eyes." Eugène Bertol-Graivil noted "the striking contrast of the black and red tones" in her Carmen of 1889.

But her La Femme au chapeau rouge, when shown at Perpignan in 1884, caused a "sensation" according to the newspaper L'Espérance, whose reviewer defended the work against certain artists who criticized it "so harshly that I wonder if it doesn't require a certain courage to react against their assessments. Well, no, gentlemen, I don't agree with you." After asserting the work's technical virtues, the critic observed that "the whole thing reveals a temperament that one wouldn't expect to find in a woman."

Reviewing the nudes exhibited at the Salon of 1888, Alphonse de Calonne used Gougelet's work as a springboard to lambaste "the vulgarity of studio models," writing, "What ceases to be decent is this woman three-quarters clothed in beautiful blue velvet, which Mademoiselle Jeanne Gougelet titles Après le bain; not that the nudity of the throat and feet are devoid of value; on the contrary, the flesh is alive, but it is commonplace."

Arthur Pougin in an article published in 1890 cited her among the "distinguished names" among female French painters, but her works never thereafter appeared in the Paris Salon and traces of her in the French press vanish. However, by 1894 her work had found its way across the Atlantic, with her name listed among "celebrated artists" shown that year at the Schenk Art Gallery in New York.

21st-century auction records for the artist were set by two of her less typical works, The Death of Siegfried, auctioned for $7,250 at Neal Auction, New Orleans in 2005, and a portrait of a bare-breasted woman with red hair auctioned for $7000 at Wiederseim Associates, Chester Springs, PA, in 2007.

== Personal life ==
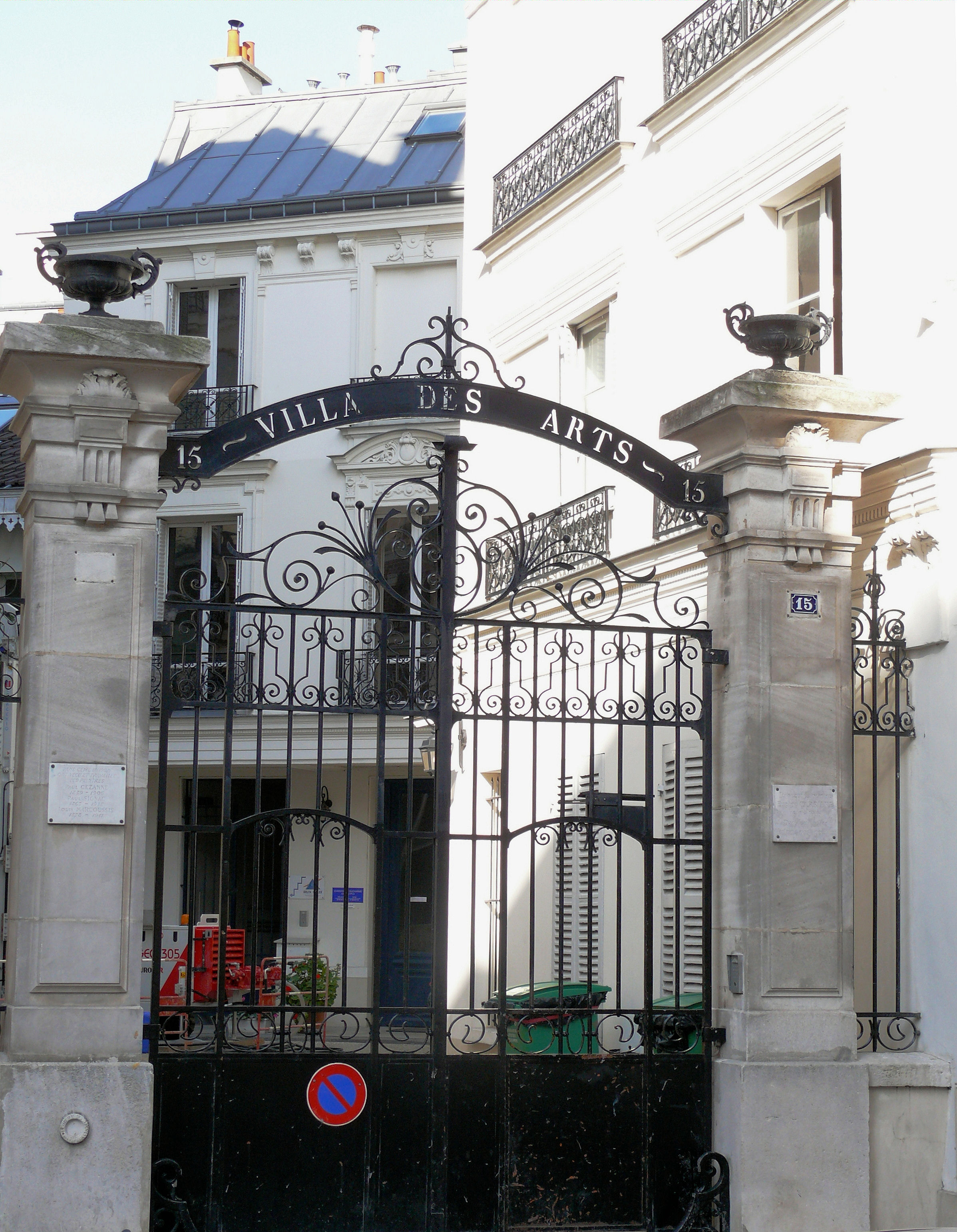
Gougelet was among the artists with a studio at the Villa des Arts in Montmartre.

Beyond her career, little is known about Gougelet. Up to the year 1889 (when she turned 32) Paris Salon catalogues list her as Mlle. Jeanne Gougelet, indicating she was unmarried. She remained close to her retired father, who in 1888 petitioned the City of Paris to acquire her Salon painting Après le bain. (His effort evidently did not succeed, as the painting was recorded as sold in 1898, for 208 francs.) Paris Salon catalogues list her address as Avenue Rapp 6 in 1883, and thereafter as L’Impasse Hélène 15 (now Rue Hégésippe Moreau), the famous Villa des Arts in the Montmartre area of Paris.

== Exhibited works ==
All are oil paintings unless otherwise noted:

- Une Japonaise, Paris Salon of 1883
- Etude, Paris Salon of 1884
- Concert Japonais, Parisienne, and Une Soirée à Trianon (drawing) Amiens Salon of 1884
- Parisienne, Une Soirée à Trianon, and La Femme au chapeau rouge, Perpignan Salon of 1884
- Printemps and Le Maître à Danser (drawing), Exposition Annuelle du Musée de Rouen, 1884
- Une Chanson (drawing) and Le chat botté (drawing), Exposition Internationale de Blanc et Noir, Paris, 1885
- Une Visite à l'Atelier, Dijon Salon of 1885
- Le page au Marlborough, Paris Salon of 1886
- La Veuve de Pierrot, Perpignon Salon of 1886
- La Fête des Fous (drawing) and Une noce sous Louis XVI (drawing), Exposition Internationale de Blanc et Noir, Paris, 1886
- Madrid, Paris Salon of 1887
- Après le bain, Paris Salon of 1888
- Carmen, Fantaisie, Une Chanson (drawing), and Hallebardiers (drawing), Exposición Universal de Barcelona, 1888
- Dans le Parc, Nice Salon of 1889
- Carmen, Paris Salon of 1889
- At the Chestnut Merchant's, Fifth Avenue Auction Rooms, New York, 1895
- Jeune Femme, Hôtel Drouot, Paris, 1898
- Summer, Autumn, and Winter (three watercolors), Stan V. Henkels, Philadelphia, 1916
- Buste de jeune femme à la draperie rouge, Hôtel Drouot, Paris, 1929

== Gallery ==
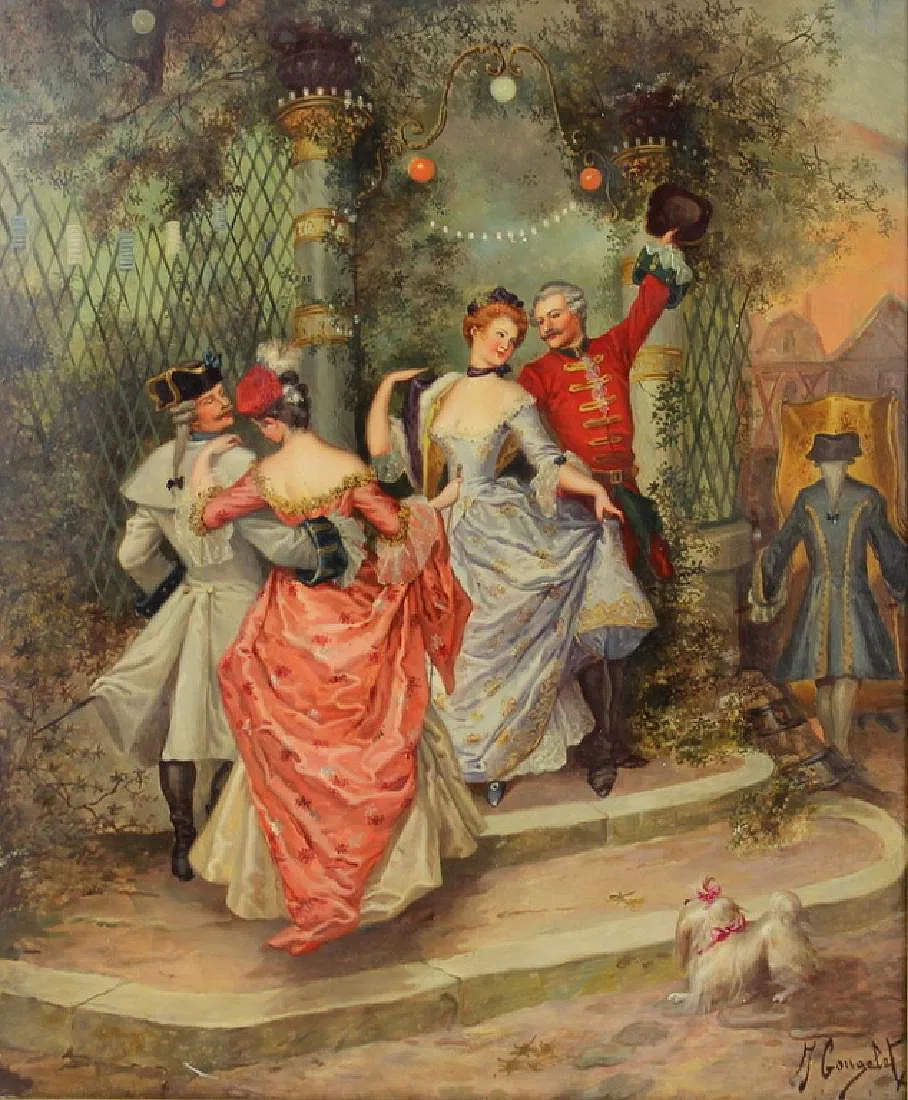
A fête galante painting, private collection

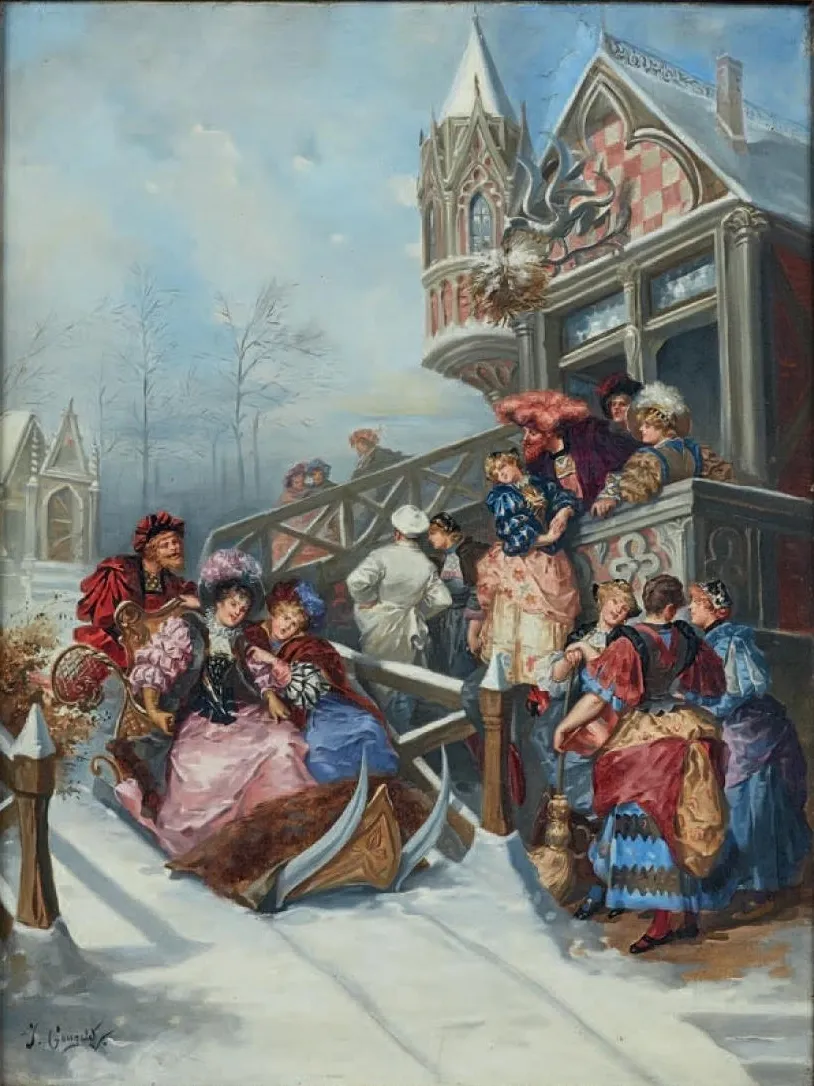
Wintertime fête galante, private collection

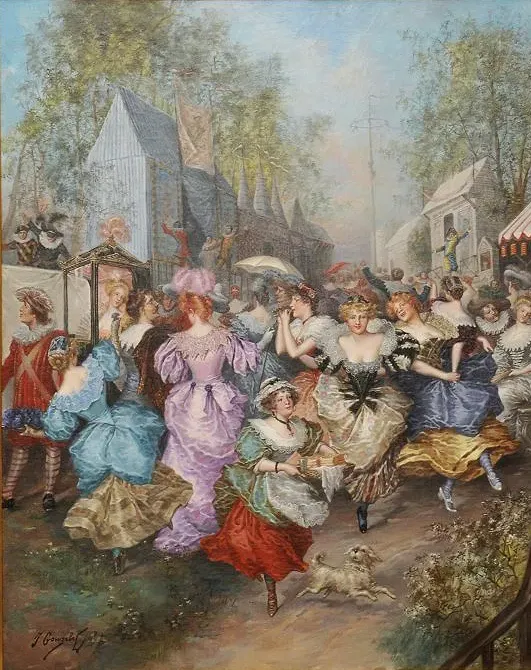
À la fête, 1898, private collection

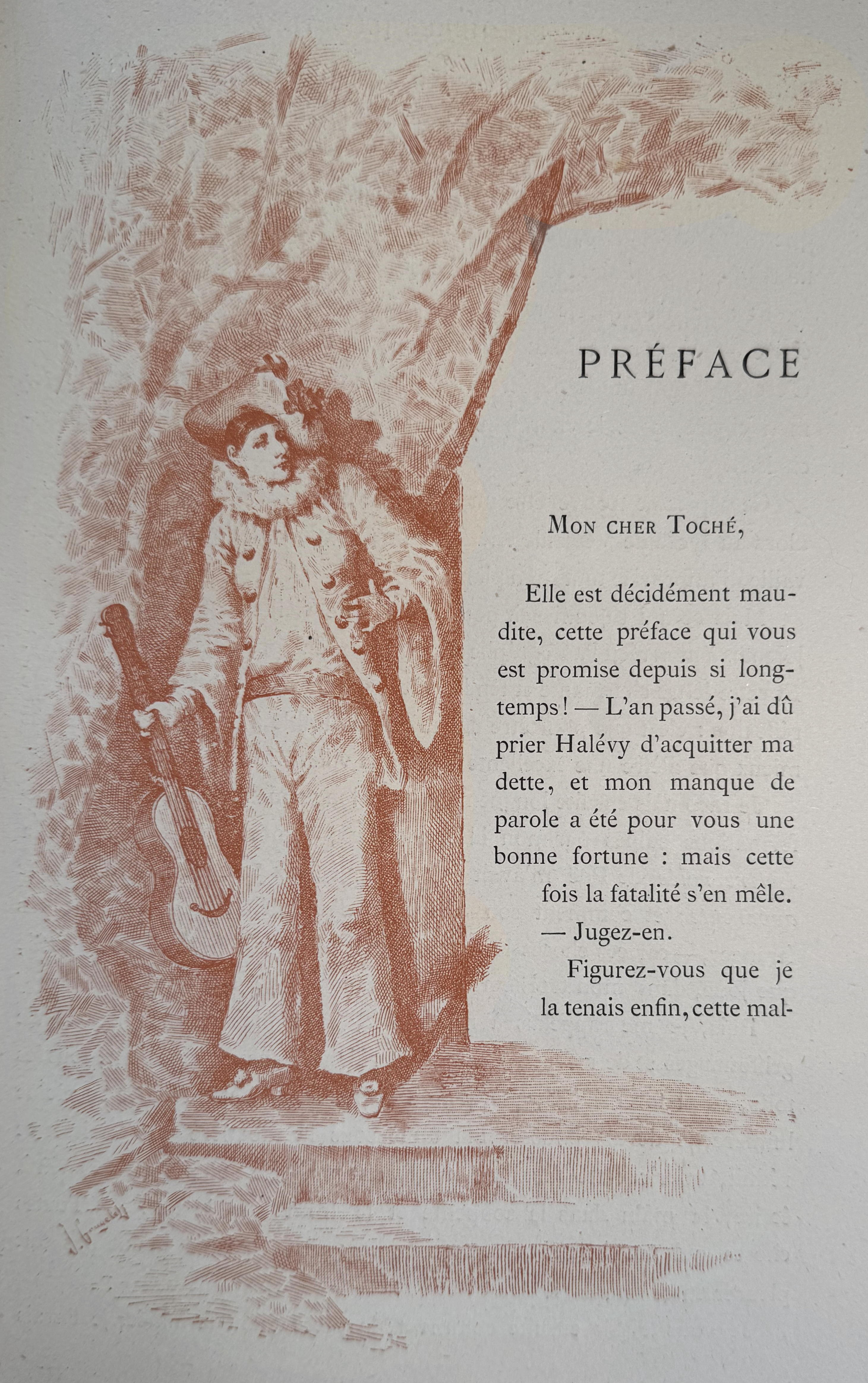
Illustration in sanguine for Les Première Illustrées, Saison Théatricale 1883-1884

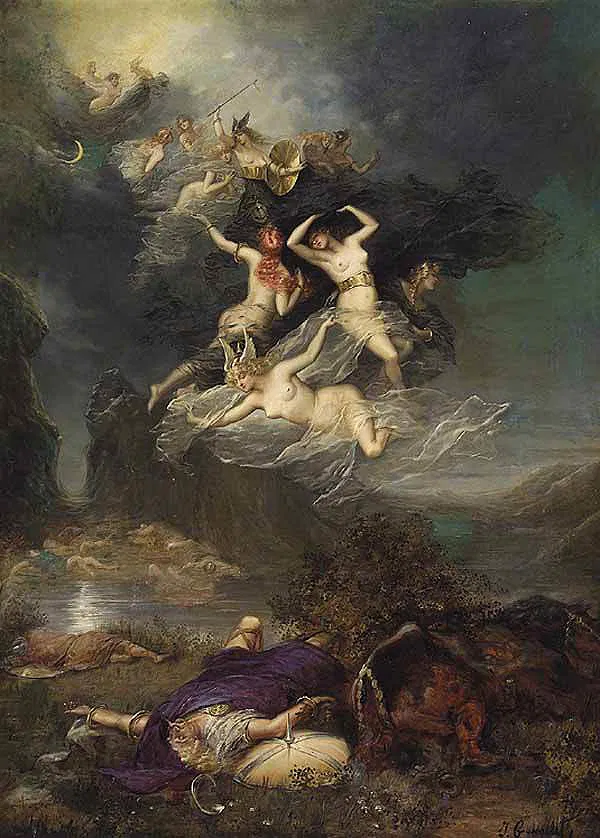
The Death of Siegfried, private collection

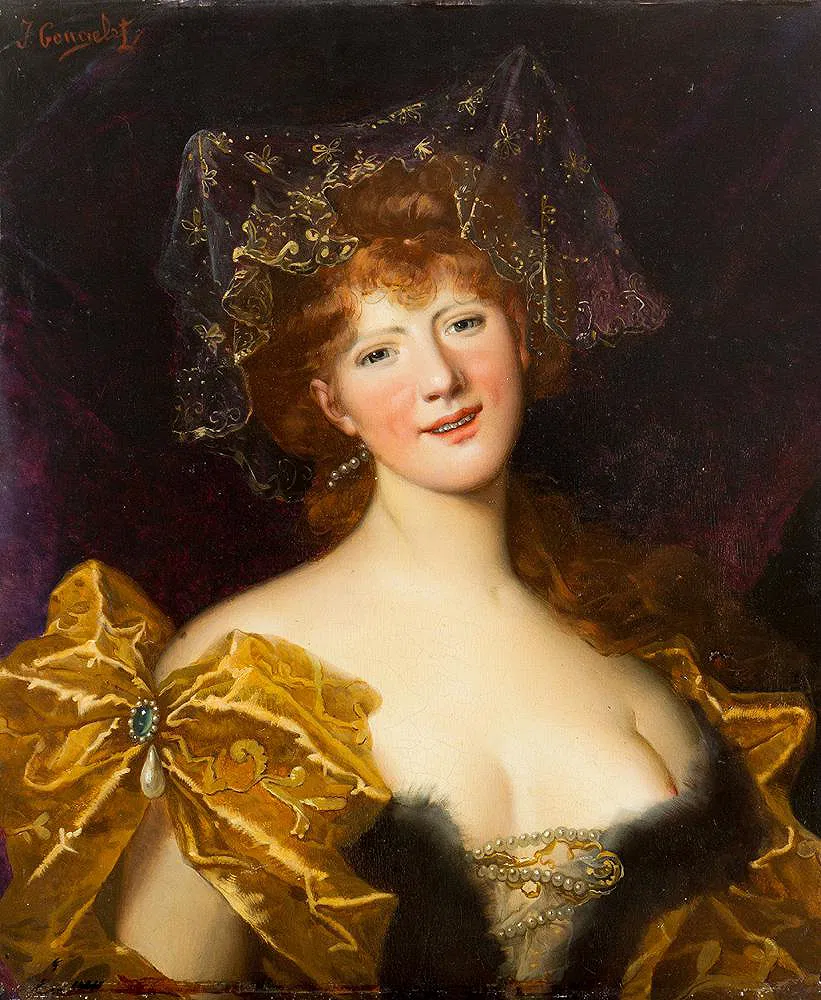
A redhead in elegant costume, private collection

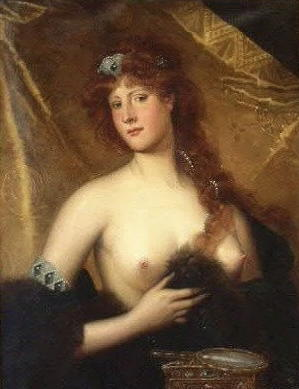
Bare-breasted woman with red hair, private collection

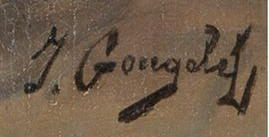
The artist's signature, from Au Secret bien gardé
