= Brighella =

Character from de theatre style Commedia dell'arte

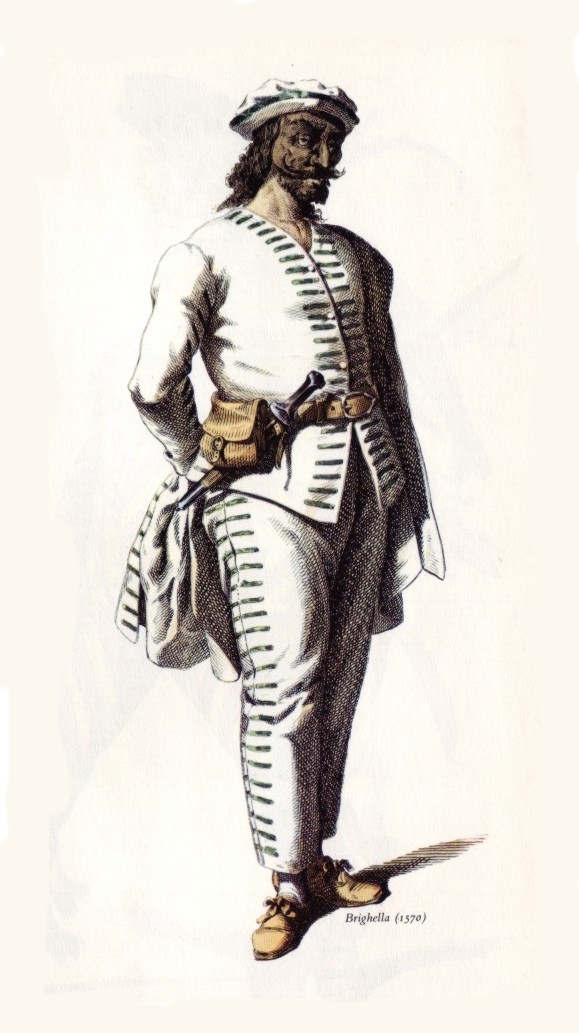
Brighella, from the 16th century

Brighella (Bergamasque dialect: Brighèla) is a masked comic character from the Italian theatre style commedia dell'arte. His early costume consisted of loose-fitting white smock and pants with green trim and was often equipped with a batocio (also batacchio or battacio, depending on region) or slapstick, or else with a wooden sword. Later, he took to wearing a sort of livery with a matching cape. He wore a greenish half-mask (traditionally an olive-green color) displaying a look of preternatural lust and greed. It is distinguished by a hook nose and thick lips, along with a thick twirled mustache to give him an offensive characteristic. He evolved out of the general Zanni, as evidenced by his costume, and came into his own around the start of the 16th century.

He is loosely categorized as one of the Zanni or servant characters, although he often was portrayed as a member of the middle class, such as a tavern owner: his character could be adapted to whatever the needs to the scenario might be, just as Brighella himself is adaptable to any circumstance. He is essentially Harlequin's smarter and much more vindictive older brother. They both share the same traditional birthplace: Bergamo, a city in northern Italy. As in a stereotype of those who have risen from poverty, he is often most cruel to those beneath him on the social ladder; he even goes so far as to kill on occasion. In later versions of his character, these violent and malicious traits were lessened substantially. Pierre Louis Duchartre, in his The Italian Comedy, theorizes that in France, the gentrified Brighella eventually culminated in the character of Figaro, known from the plays and operas.

Brighella is a masterful liar, and can make up a spur-of-the moment lie for any situation. He is an inveterate schemer, and he is good at what he does. If his plans fail, it was almost always out of luck on behalf of the other characters. When he is a servant, he will either serve his master devotedly or look for every opportunity to ruin and take advantage of him as he happens to see fit—whatever will gain the greatest advantage for himself and himself alone. He is fond of money, but spends it rapidly, and tends to be especially fond of the drink. In fact, he has few good qualities, save for his ability to entertain the audience.

His walk is distinguishable from the traditional Zanni movement by the torso bending from side to side, while the head stays vertical. The knees stay open and the elbows bend down with each movement of the leg.

His character is usually from uptown Milan or Bergamo, and in the original Italian, would often speak with the local accent. He could be very witty and fond of word play. He is also an accomplished singer, dancer and musician, and sometimes would play the guitar on stage.

His name comes from an Italian word which can mean "bother" or "contention"; Florio's 1611 Italian-English Dictionary defines briga as meaning "a brable, a braule, a contention". Brighella in English would be therefore something like 'Fighty' or 'Brawly'. The other Italian word attaccabrighe ('hellraiser') utilizes the same element.

== Famous Brighellas ==
17th century:

- Domenico Boroncini

18th century:

- Giuseppe Antonio Angeleri
- Tommaso Fortunati
- Pietro Gandini
- Carlo Campi
- Atanasio Zanoni

== Variants ==
A list of variations of the character, according to Duchartre, are:

- Beltrame: from the 17th century, a "wilfully blind husband and rascal as crafty as Brighella". He was Milanese and spoke the local dialect. As part of his costume, he apparently wore a distinctive large tunic.
- Scapin, or Scapino: a much more nervous and cowardly version of Brighella.
- Truccagnino: see Fenocchio.
- Mezzetino: a gentler version of Brighella, fond of the ladies even if they were not fond of him.
- Fenocchio: more prone to playing pranks than committing serious intrigues, he otherwise shared Brighella's fondness for malice.
- Flautino: a musical Brighella, often singing a cappella. The Comédie-Italienne actor Giovanni Gherardi, who performed this role, was able to perform the part of an entire orchestra with his voice alone.
- Sbrigani: sometimes the exact opposite of Brighella, otherwise an identical character; like twins. Frequently appeared alongside Brighella onstage.
- Franca Trippa, Francatrippa or Francatrippe: created in the late 16th century, spoke a mixture of Bolognese and Tuscan dialects. An upper-class Brighella. Could be capable of gymnastic or other physical feats.
- Turlupin or Tirelupin: a French Brighella created by Henri Legrand. The name means, according to Duchartre, "unlucky". However, the Oxford English Dictionary mentions an etymology relating to a cult that modelled themselves on the Cynics and lived off of lupins that they gathered (tiraient). The character was reputedly fond of vulgar word play.
- Gandolin: a French Brighella, very fond of word play and puns. Sometimes wears a fur-lined plumed hat.
- Fritellino or Fristelin: see Francatrippa.
- Sgnarelle: a chronic drunk.
- Bagatino
- Gradelino
- Pasquariel
- Buffet
- Gian Fritello
- Narcisino
- Grattelard
- Mascarille
- La Montagne
- Frontin
- Labranche
- Figaro: as created by Beaumarchais. See Le Barbier de Séville.

== See also ==
- Commedia dell'arte

== Bibliography ==
- Duchartre, Pierre Louis (1966). The Italian Comedy: The Improvisation Scenarios Lives Attributes Portraits and Masks of the Illustrious Characters of the Commedia dell'Arte. Canada: Dover Publications.
- Rudlin, John; Oliver Crick (2001). Commedia dell'arte. Routledge. ISBN 978-0-415-20409-5.
- Nicoll, Allardyce (1976) [1963]. The World of Harlequin: A Critical Study of the Commedia dell'Arte. Cambridge: Cambridge University Press. ISBN 0-521-29132-1.
