= Beltrame =

Commedia dell'arte character

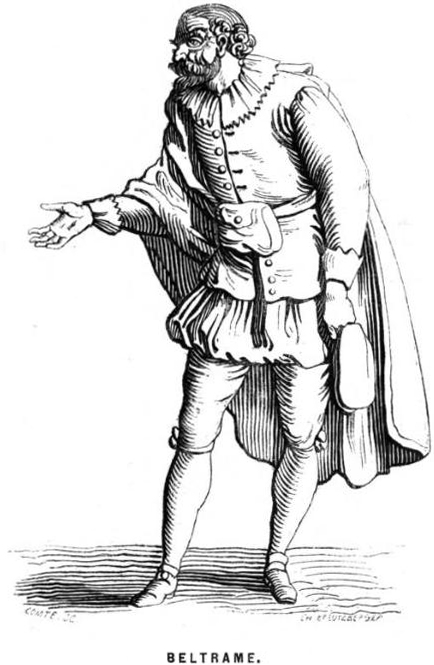
Beltrame

Beltrame (in Milanese: baltramm) is a traditional character of the commedia dell'arte associated to the city of Milan, and dating back to the 16th–17th century or earlier. It is also often referenced by the full name Beltrame di Milano and also as Beltrame di Gaggiano (from the borgo – now a comune – of Gaggiano, in the surroundings of Milan) or Beltrame de la Gippa (where the "gippa" is the large blouse, or tunic, worn by the character).

The creation of Beltrame's character is sometimes credited to Niccolò Barbieri. In any case, Barbieri largely contributed to the popularity of the character with plays such as L'inavvertito. Barbieri was an actor as well as a comedian, and assumed the role and stage name of Beltrame himself. His character is usually a crafty, astute villager and husband and blunderer, always trying to appear of higher rank than he really is;. He took on several different roles, including that of the merchant and of Colombina's father trying to force his daughter into a marriage of convenience (a part he shares with Tabarino). He often reaches his goals in virtue of his lack of scruples, astute rhetoric, and mock good manners. His costume, resembling that of a 16th-century servant, included a large tunic, a purse, and a dagger.

Beltrame has long been the main representative of Milan in the commedia, although this role was later taken on by Meneghino. It is also often described as a variation of character Brighella (associated with the city of Bergamo, and sometimes also with Milan), or even as Brighella's brother.

Beltrame has inspired Molière's character Mascarille, from the comedy L'Étourdi ou Les Contretemps (The Blunderer, 1655).
