= Niccolò Barbieri =

Italian writer and actor

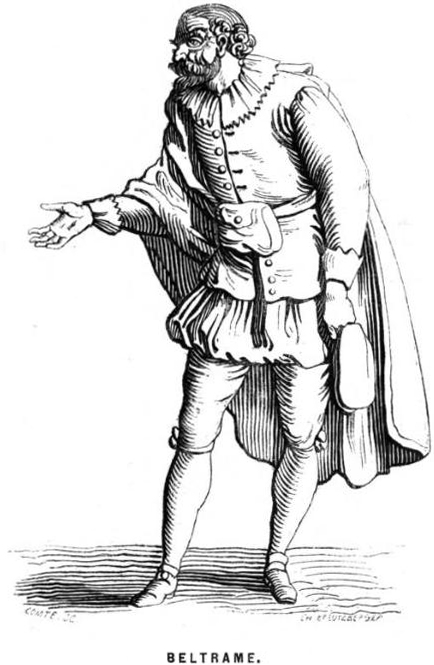
Beltrame, one of Barbieri's most popular characters

Niccolò (or Nicolò) Barbieri (Vercelli, 1586–1641) was an Italian writer and actor of the commedia dell'arte theatrical genre. He was also known as Beltrame di Milano ("Beltrame of Milan") in reference to one of his most popular characters, Beltrame; this was the main character of one of Barbieri's best known plays, L'inavertito, which is known to have inspired Molière's L'Étourdi ou les Contretemps ("The Blunderer").

Barbieri was a successful author and actor, and one of those who toured Europe; he is known, for example, to have played at the royal court of France.

Besides plays, he wrote essays on theatre; his prominent essay is La supplica. Discorso famigliare a quelli che trattano de' comici (1634), a passionate apology of theatre and actors, which is also an important source of information on the commedia culture.

As a commedia actor, Barbieri introduced the habit of acting while standing on a chair, which is supposedly the origin of the Italian word saltimbanco (which roughly translates to "s.o. who jumps on chairs") to refer to comic actors and jesters.
