= Marco Beltrame (ski jumper) =

Italian ski jumper

Marco Beltrame (born 23 December 1986) is an Italian retired World Cup ski jumper.

Beltrame, born in Gemona del Friuli, placed third in the large hill event of the 2005 Italian championships of ski jumping. He competed in the Winter Olympics in Turin 2006, but did not pass the qualification. His personal best is 185 metres, which he took in Planica 2005.
