= The Shepherds (Watteau) =

Painting by Antoine Watteau

- Les Bergers (French)
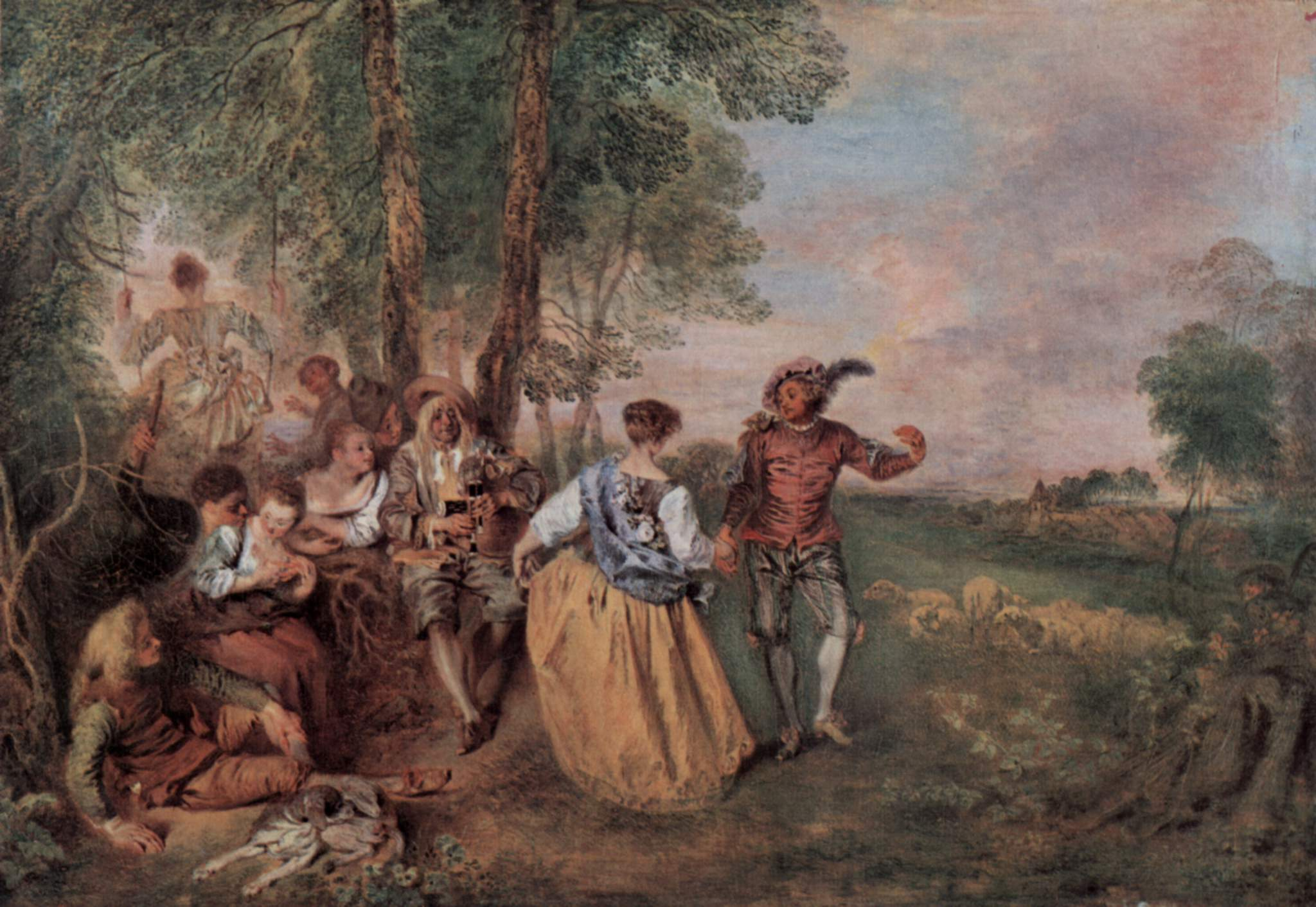
- Artist: Antoine Watteau
- Year: c. 1717
- Medium: oil on canvas
- Movement: Fête champêtre
- Location: Schloss Charlottenburg, Berlin

The Shepherds (French - Les Bergers) is a c. 1717 painting by Antoine Watteau, now in the Schloss Charlottenburg in Berlin. It is the most finished version of a composition later reused by the same artist in Pastoral Pleasure (c.1714-1716, Musée Condé).

== Description and themes ==
It shows city-dwellers in the countryside pretending to be peasants. In the centre a young man dressed in an elegant doublet and a plumed beret dances what seems to be a minuet with a young woman in a satin dress whilst a musician plays for them. One other couple observes the dancers, another couple whispers to each other and a third plays with a swing. Several details are directly inspired by the work of Peter Paul Rubens - the musician, his neighbour, the shepherd embracing the woman next to him and the dog in the foreground. The affected character of the scene is heightened by the presence of a real shepherd, whose sheep graze in the far right background, almost hidden by bushes. Overall the painting transposes French pastoral poetry of the time into painted form.

It refers to Poussin's Bergers d’Arcadie, but this is misleading since the pastoral paintings by Poussin show a mythological Arcadia peopled by idealised classical shepherds, with no trace of real contemporary shepherds. The shepherds painted by Watteau and written about by Fontenelle are instead 'half-true', as Fontenelle himself later explained:

So whence comes it that sheepfold scenes are pleasing despite the deception of characters which must always hurt them? Do we enjoy that they show us courtiers with a rudeness that makes them look much like real shepherds, that the delicacy and gallantry which they give to shepherds resembles that of courtiers? Definitely not; but the character of the shepherds is not false, taken in a certain way. We don't look at the baseness of their real cares, but at the little embarrassment that these cares cause. This baseness would exclude all that made for agreeable and gallant scenes; but instead the tranquility in these works serves well, and forms the sole foundation for all that is agreeable about the pastoral life. It takes away from truth to please the imagination; but it is not difficult to make [the viewer] content; it often only needs a half-truth.

The style is close to the shepherd-lovers and wrapped-up shepherdesses of abbé Du Bos. The figures' harmony with nature in Watteau's work was a convention in an aristocratic society which emulated an idealised pastoral state in the gardens of Versailles.
