= Beltrame Feragut =

French composer

Beltrame Feragut or Bertrand d'Avignon (Avignon c. 1385 – c. 1450) was a French composer. He was one of several French composers who worked in Italy, at Florence and Vicenza. Bertrand was either a priest or monk, since that was then a requirement to become maestro di cappella at Milan Cathedral (1426–1430).

== Recordings ==
- Francorum nobilitati – Ensemble Perlaro, PAN, 2010
