= The Two Cousins =

Painting by Antoine Watteau

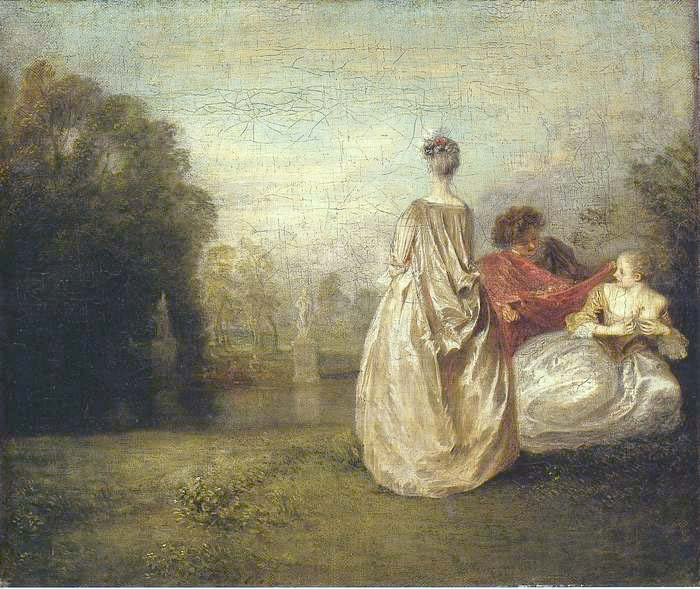
The Two Cousins (1716) by Antoine Watteau

The Two Cousins is a 1716 oil-on-canvas painting by Antoine Watteau, now in the Louvre Museum, in Paris, which acquired it in 1990.
