= L'Étourdi ou les Contretemps =

Play by Molière

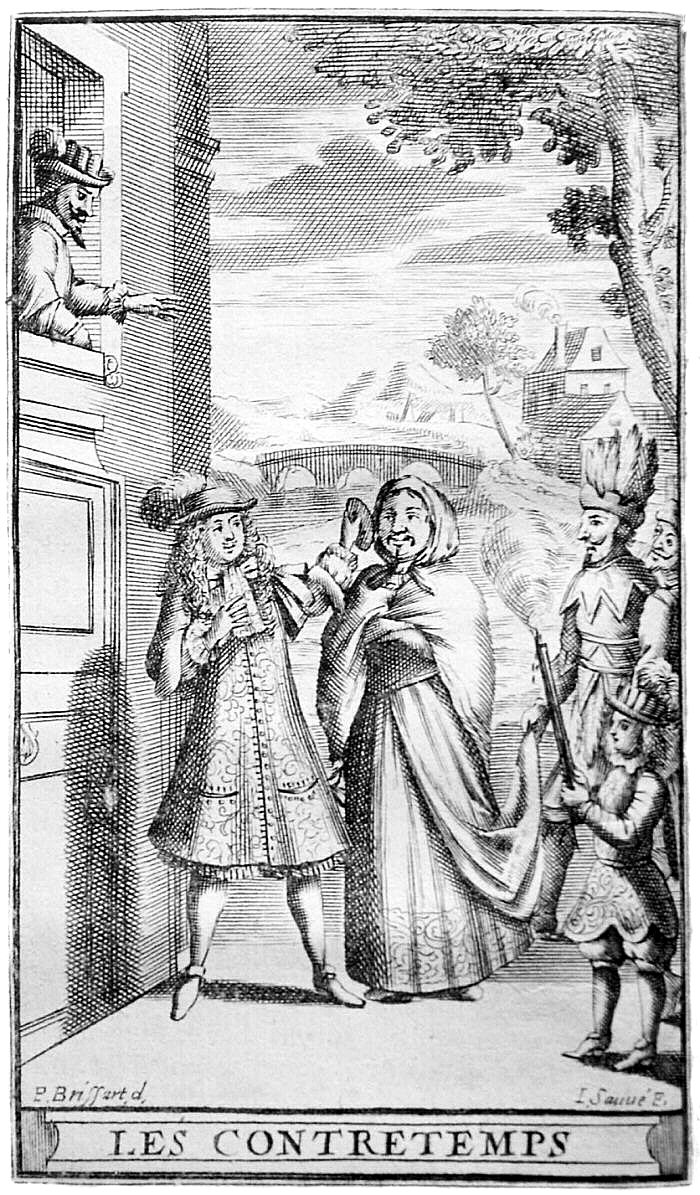
- Frontispiece from a 1682 edition
- Written by: Molière
- Original language: French
- Genre: Comedy
- Setting: Messina, Sicily

Premiere
- Date premiered: 1655 (Note: The year of the first performance is uncertain and is sometimes said to be 1653.)
- Place premiered: Lyon

L’Étourdi ou les Contretemps (The Blunderer, or the Counterplots), also known in English as The Bungler, (Note: The name is often shortened to just L’Étourdi in French or The Blunderer in English.) is a five-act theatrical comedy by the French playwright Molière. After premiering in Lyon in 1655, it appeared at the Théâtre du Petit-Bourbon in Paris in November 1658. The plot follows a servant's schemes to help his wealthy employer win the affections of a poor young woman.

== Characters ==
- Lelio (Lélie in the French original), a young aristocrat
- Leander (Léandre), Lelio's rival
- Mascarille, Lelio's servant
- Hippolyta (Hippolyte), a young woman
- Celia (Célie), a gypsy woman
- Trufaldin, an old man
- Pandolphus (Pandolfe), Lelio's father
- Anselmo (Anselme), Hippolyta's father
- Ergaste, a servant
- Andrès, a young man

== Plot ==
Two young aristocrats, Lelio and Leander, have been romancing a woman named Hippolyta, who is now engaged to Lelio. However, both men have become infatuated with Celia, a young gypsy who is enslaved by an old miser named Trufaldin because her family owes him money. Lelio asks his servant Mascarille to devise a scheme to break his engagement with Hippolyta and win the love of Celia instead. Mascarille suggests paying the debt owed to Trufaldin, but Lelio is dependent on his wealthy father Pandolphus, who would not be willing to help. Instead Mascarille contrives to visit Celia by claiming he wants her to tell his fortune. Lelio ruins the scheme by contradicting Mascarille's story. Mascarille attempts to steal a purse from Hippolyta's father, Anselmo, but Lelio mistakenly interrupts. When Mascarille arranges for Anselmo to purchase Celia and bring her to him, Lelio, who does not know about the plan, interferes because he thinks Anselmo is taking her away.

For his next scheme, Mascarille involves Lelio in the plan. They send Pandolphus to his farm and fake his death. To get the money for Celia, they ask Anselmo for a loan on the pretense that Lelio can pay it back with his inheritance. This scheme is ruined when Pandolphus returns to the city prematurely. Mascarille then discovers that Leander has arranged to purchase Celia. Mascarille pretends Lelio has beaten him and offers to help Leander as revenge. However, before Mascarille can retrieve Celia, a messenger arrives claiming that Celia is the kidnapped daughter of a Spanish nobleman, who is coming to claim her. The letter is ruse by Lelio, who has again inadvertently spoiled his servant's plans. Mascarille commiserates with Leander about Lelio's deception, but also suggests that Celia is a woman of loose morals in an attempt to turn Leander against her. Upon hearing what Mascarille has said, Lelio does not realize it is a trick. He confronts the servant in front of Leander and accidentally exposes the lies Mascarille has told.

Ergaste informs Mascarille that Leander plans to take a group to Trufaldin disguised as female mummers who want Celia to join them for the evening. Mascarille decides to use the same trick before Leander. However, when Ergaste tells Lelio about Leander's plans, Lelio rushes to Trufaldin to warn him, not realizing he has again frustrated his servant's scheme.

Mascarille's next scheme is to disguise Lelio as a foreign merchant who knows Trufaldin's son, who Trufaldin has not seen in over a decade. Lelio is unable to keep the details of the story straight, and Trufaldin chases him away. Anselmo convinces Leander to abandon his pursuit of Celia and marry Hippolyta instead, but a new rival for Lelio appears when Celia's former love Andrès arrives to pay her family's debt. Mascarille arranges to have Andrès arrested, but Lelio mistakenly intervenes to prevent the arrest. As Andrès makes arrangements to leave with Celia, Lelio arrives and reveals his love for her. Celia confesses that she loves Lelio, but is not willing to hurt Andrès after he has rescued her. This impasse is resolved when it is revealed that both Andrès and Celia are Trufaldin's long-lost children. Since they are siblings, they cannot marry, thus freeing Celia to be with Lelio.

== History ==
Molière was inspired by an Italian play, L'Inavvertito by Niccolò Barbieri, which had been published in 1629. The main character of that play, a servant called Scapino, was the inspiration for the character Mascarille, and many elements of the plot are similar. Molière played the role of Mascarille when his company performed the play.

== Adaptations ==
Sir Martin Mar-all, a 1667 play by the English writer John Dryden, was based on a translation of L'Étourdi.
