= Mezzetino (Watteau) =

Painting by Antoine Watteau

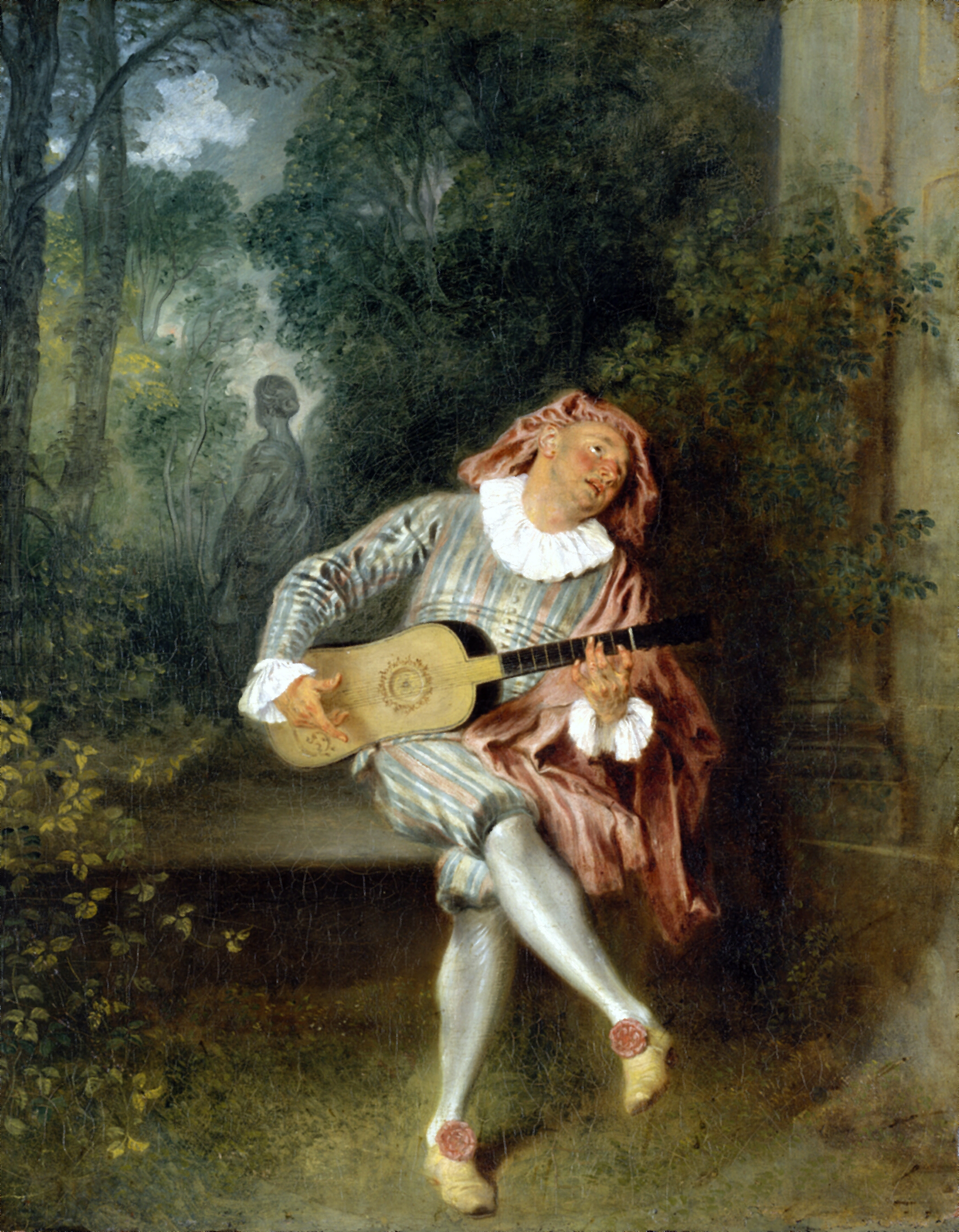
- Artist: Jean-Antoine Watteau
- Year: c. 1718–1720
- Medium: Oil on canvas
- Subject: Mezzetino playing guitar
- Dimensions: 55.2 cm × 43.2 cm (21.7 in × 17.0 in)
- Location: Metropolitan Museum of Art, New York City
- Accession: 34.138

Mezzetino (transl. Mezzetin; French: Mézetin) is an oil-on-canvas painting in the Metropolitan Museum of Art, New York, by the French Rococo painter Jean-Antoine Watteau. Dated within 1717–1720, Mezzetino forms a full-length single-figure composition, depicting the eponymous character in commedia dell'arte. In the 18th century, Mezzetino was owned by Jean de Jullienne, the friend and patron of Watteau who supervised the four-volume edition of prints after the artist's works, for which the picture was engraved by Benoit Audran the Elder; after Jullienne's death in 1766, it was acquired for the Hermitage in Saint Petersburg, then recently established by Empress Catherine II of Russia. During the Soviet sales in May 1930, Mezzetino was sold to British-American businessman Calouste Gulbenkian; it was later sold to the Wildenstein art firm in Paris and New York, from which it was bought in 1934 by the Metropolitan Museum of Art, where it remains; the institution also owns a preparatory study—a drawing of the man's head.

Mezzetino was a comedy character, based on Harlequin but with his own distinctive costume, who was introduced for the first time by the Théâtre italien de Paris actor Angelo Costantini on October 16, 1683. Constantini's expressive face allowed him to portray the role without a mask, a tradition kept alive by all successive Mezzetinos. That novelty attracted Watteau, who featured Mezzetino in several of his works. In the picture, Mezzetino is playing his guitar and singing, his eyes lifted as if towards an unseen balcony. The statue of Venus behind him is facing away, suggesting that his feelings are not shared by the lady she represents. Although the model for Mezzetino is not known, the fact that Jean de Jullienne, who, while selling a number of Watteau's works through his life, still kept Mezzetino, suggests he may have fulfilled the role.

== Exhibition history ==
List of exhibitions featuring the work
Year	Title	Location	Cat. no.
1934	A Century of Progress	Art Institute, Chicago	154
1935	Exposition de l'art français au XVIIIe siècle / Udstillingen af frankrigs kunst fra det XVIII. aarhundrede	Charlottenborg Palace, Copenhagen	260
1935	French Painting and Sculpture of the XVIII Century	Metropolitan Museum of Art, New York	5
1937	Chefs d'œuvre de l'art français	Palais National des Arts, Paris	231
1951	Wildenstein Jubilee Loan Exhibition, 1901-1951: Masterpieces From Museums and Private Collections	Wildenstein & Company Building, New York	17
1952–1953	Art Treasures of the Metropolitan	Metropolitan Museum of Art, New York	127
1970	Masterpieces of Painting in The Metropolitan Museum of Art	Museum of Fine Arts, Boston	*
1970–1971	Masterpieces of Fifty Centuries	Metropolitan Museum of Art, New York	303
1977	Paris — New York, A Continuing Romance	Wildenstein & Company Building, New York	54
1984–1985	Watteau 1684–1721	National Gallery of Art, Washington, D.C.; Galeries nationales du Grand Palais, Paris; Charlottenburg Palace, Berlin	P. 49
2003–2004	The Age of Watteau, Chardin, and Fragonard: Masterpieces of French Genre Painting	National Gallery of Canada, Ottawa; National Gallery of Art, Washington, D.C.; Gemäldegalerie, Berlin	10
2009	Watteau, Music, and Theater	Metropolitan Museum of Art, New York	12
General references: Grasselli, Rosenberg & Parmantier 1984, pp. 364–365; Baejter 2010. "*" denotes an unnumbered entry.

== Bibliography ==
- Adhémar, Hélène (1950). Watteau; sa vie, son oeuvre (in French). Includes L’univers de Watteau, an introduction by René Huyghe. Paris: P. Tisné. pp. 100, 119, 127, 230; cat. no. 206; pl. 144 (detail), and colorpl. 145. OCLC 853537.
- Allen, Josephine L.; Gardner, Elizabeth L. (1954). A Concise Catalogue of the European Paintings in the Metropolitan Museum of Art. New York: Metropolitan Museum of Art. p. 102 – via the Internet Archive.
- Androsov, S. O. (2018). Western European Painting of the Fourteenth–Early Twentieth Centuries in the Hermitage Collection (art book) (in Russian). Saint Petersburg: State Hermitage Publishers. p. 26. ISBN 978-5-93572-741-3. OCLC 1110195118.
- Baetjer, Katharine, ed. (2009). Watteau, Music, and Theater. Rosenberg, Pierre (an introduction by); Cowart, Georgia J. (an essay by). New York: The Metropolitan Museum of Art. pp. 44–47, 84–85. ISBN 978-1-58839-335-7.
- Baejter, Katherine (2010). "Mezzetin". Metropolitan Museum of Art.
- Baetjer, Katharine (2019). French Paintings in The Metropolitan Museum of Art from the Early Eighteenth Century through the Revolution. New York: Metropolitan Museum of Art. pp. 62–66, cat. no. 10. ISBN 978-1-58839-661-7 – via Google Books.
- Bailey, Colin B., ed. (2003). The Age of Watteau, Chardin, and Fragonard: Masterpieces of French Genre Painting. New Haven, London, Ottawa: Yale University Press, National Gallery of Canada. pp. 140, 141, 357. ISBN 0-88884-767-X. OCLC 51330581.
- Banks, Oliver T. (1977). Watteau and the North: Studies in the Dutch and Flemish Baroque Influence on French Rococo Painting. New York, London: Garland. pp. 121, 183–84, figs. 35, 119. OCLC 1075255658.
- Barker, G. W. (1939). Antoine Watteau. London: Duckworth. p. 137. OCLC 556817570.
- Benois, A. N. (1997) [originally published ca. 1911]. Путеводитель по картинной галерее Императорского Эрмитажа (in Russian). Moscow: Izobrazitel'noe iskusstvo. ISBN 5-85200-213-5.
- Börsch-Supan, Helmut [in German] (2000). Antoine Watteau, 1684-1721. Meister der französischen Kunst (in German). Köln: Könemann. pp. 124–125. ISBN 3-8290-1630-1. OCLC 925262301.
- Brookner, Anita (1985) [1967]. Watteau. Colour Library of Art. Feltham: Hamlyn. p. 33; colorpl. 37. ISBN 0-600-50156-6. OCLC 922565837 – via the Internet Archive.
- Camesasca, Ettore [in Portuguese] (1971). The Complete Painting of Watteau. Classics of the World's Great Art. Introduction by John Sutherland. New York: Harry N. Abrams. pp. 121–122, cat. no. 193. ISBN 0810955253. OCLC 143069 – via the Internet Archive.
- Dacier, Émile; Vuaflart, Albert (1922). Jean de Julienne et les graveurs de Watteau au XVIII-e siècle. II. Historique (in French). Paris: M. Rousseau. pp. 58, 67, 93, 97, 102, 132, 151. doi:10.11588/DIGLIT.41976. OCLC 1039154548.
- Dacier, Émile; Vuaflart, Albert (1922). Jean de Julienne et les graveurs de Watteau au XVIII-e siècle. III. Catalogue (in French). Paris: M. Rousseau. pp. 100–101, no. 215. doi:10.11588/DIGLIT.41977. OCLC 1039156495.
- Dargenty, G. (1891). Antoine Watteau. Les Artistes Célèbres (in French). Paris: Librarie de l'Art. p. 63. OCLC 1039952242 – via the Internet Archive.
- Descargues, Pierre (1961). The Hermitage Museum, Leningrad. New York: Harry N. Abrams. pp. 25, 31–32, 72. OCLC 829900432.
- Dilke, E. F. (1899). French Painters of the Eighteenth Century. London: G. Bell. p. 82. OCLC 1045594851 – via the Internet Archive.
- Europe in the Age of Monarchy. Introduction by John T. Spike. New York: The Metropolitan Museum of Art. 1987. p. 146. ISBN 0-87099-449-2 – via Google Books.
- Gammon, Martin (2018). Deaccessioning and Its Discontents: A Critical History. Cambridge, Mass.: MIT Press. p. 286. ISBN 9780262037587. OCLC 995805826.
- Garnier-Pelle, Nicole (1995). Chantilly, musée Condé. Peintures du xviiie siècle. Inventaire des collections publiques de France (in French). Vol. 38. Paris: Réunion des musées nationaux. pp. 134, 152–153. OCLC 33264438.
- Goncourt, Edmond de (1875). Catalogue raisonné de l'oeuvre peint, dessiné et gravé d'Antoine Watteau. Paris: Rapilly. pp. 80–81. OCLC 1041772738 – via the Internet Archive.
- Grasselli, Margaret Morgan; Rosenberg, Pierre; Parmantier, Nicole; et al. (1984). Watteau, 1684-1721 (PDF) (exhibition catalogue). Washington: National Gallery of Art. ISBN 0-89468-074-9. OCLC 557740787 – via the National Gallery of Art archive.
- Hannover, Emil (1888). "Des Galante Festers Maler" : Antoine Watteau (PDF) (in Danish). Copenhagen: Gyldendalske Boghandels Forlag. pp. 67, 115.
- Hédouin, P. [in French] (1856). Mosaïque. Peintres, musiciens, littérateurs, artistes dramatiques à partir du 15e siècle jusqu'à nos jours. Paris: Heugel. p. 98. OCLC 1157159285 – via the Internet Archive.
- Herold, Jacques; Vuaflart, Albert (1929). Jean de Julienne et les graveurs de Watteau au XVIII-e siècle. I. Notices et documents biographiques (in French). Paris: M. Rousseau. pp. 223–224. OCLC 1039157338.
- Hildebrandt, Edmund (1923). Antoine Watteau (in German). Berlin: Propyläen-Verlag. pp. 27–29, pl. 5. OCLC 1039987046 – via the Internet Archive.
- Huyghe, René (1970) [1950]. Watteau: The Artist and His Drawings. Translated by Barbara Bray. New York: Braziller. ISBN 978-0-269-02709-3. OCLC 556662493 – via the Internet Archive.
- Mantz, Paul (1892). Antoine Watteau. Paris: Librairie illustrée. pp. 88, 182. OCLC 742536514 – via the Internet Archive.
- Mathey, Jacques (1959). Antoine Watteau. Peintures réapparues inconnues ou négligées par les historiens (in French). Paris: F. de Nobele. pp. 36, 55, 68. OCLC 954214682.
- Mirimonde, Albert Pomme de (November 1961). "Les sujets musicaux chez Antoine Watteau". Gazette des Beaux-Arts (in French). 6.58 (1114): 249–288. OCLC 888153049.
- Mollett, John William (1883). Watteau. Illustrated Biographies of the Great Artists. London: S. Low, Marston, Searle & Rivington. p. 66, cat. no. 88. OCLC 557720162 – via the Internet Archive.
- Montagni, E. C. (1968). L'opera completa di Watteau. Classici dell'arte (in Italian). Vol. 21. Introduction by Giovanni Macchia. Milano: Rizzoli. p. 122; cat. no. 211. OCLC 1006284992. For the English edition, see Camesasca 1971.
- Moureau, François (1992). De Gherardi à Watteau. Paris: Klincksieck. pp. 95, 123. ISBN 978-2-25202-822-3. OCLC 614813362.
- Moureau, François (2011). Le goût italien dans la France rocaille: théâtre, musique, peinture (v. 1680–1750). Paris: Presses de l'Université Paris-Sorbonne. p. 101. ISBN 978-2-84050-731-4. OCLC 1114979618.
- Nicoll, Allardyce (1963). The World of Harlequin: A Critical Study of the Commedia dell'Arte. Cambridge: Cambridge University Press. p. 78, fig. 51. OCLC 1151791894 – via the Internet Archive.
- Opperman, Hal (June 1988). "Watteau 1684-1721 by Margaret Morgan Grasselli, Pierre Rosenberg and Nicole Parmentier". The Art Bulletin. 70 (2): 354–359. JSTOR 3051127.
- Phillips, Claude (1895). Antoine Watteau. London: Seeley and co. Limited. pp. 72. OCLC 729123867 – via the Internet Archive.
- Pilon, Edmond (1912). Watteau et son école. Bruxelles: G. van Oest & cie. p. 95, ill. opp. p. 92. OCLC 1158281157 – via the Internet Archive.
- Plax, Julie Anne (2000). Watteau and the Cultural Politics of Eighteenth-Century France. Cambridge etc.: Cambridge University Press. ISBN 0-521-64268-X. OCLC 803847893.
- Posner, Donald (1984). Antoine Watteau. London: Weidenfeld & Nicolson. pp. 57–58, 206, 208, 224–25, 258, 288 n. 16, colorpl. 48. ISBN 0-8014-1571-3. OCLC 10736607 – via the Internet Archive.
- Raymond, Florence, ed. (2013). Antoine Watteau (1684-1721): la leçon de musique (exhibition catalogue) (in French). Paris: Skira Flammarion. ISBN 978-2-0812-9583-4. OCLC 934385505.
- Réau, Louis (1928). "Catalogue de l'art français dans les musées russes". Bulletin de la Société de l'histoire de l'art français: 167–314 – via Gallica. Cat. no. 414.
- Réau, Louis (1928–1930). "Watteau". In Dimier, Louis (ed.). Les peintres français du XVIII-e siècle: Histoire des vies et catalogue des œuvres (in French). Vol. 1. Paris: G. Van Oest. p. 39, cat. no. 107. OCLC 564527521.
- Schneider, Pierre (1967). The World of Watteau. New York: Time-Life Books. pp. 104–105. OCLC 680174683 – via the Internet Archive.
- Somof, A. [in Russian] (1903). Ermitage imperial. Catalogue de la Galerie des tableaux. Troisième partie: école anglaise et ècole française. St. Petersburg: La Companie d'Imprimerie artistique. pp. 107–108, cat. no. 1503 – via the Internet Archive.
- Sterling, Charles (1958) [first published in 1957]. Great French Painting in the Hermitage. Translated from French by Christopher Ligota. New York: Harry N. Abrams. p. 231 n. 12. OCLC 598217.
- Sund, Judy (September 2016). "Why So Sad? Watteau's Pierrots". The Art Bulletin. 98 (3): 321–347. doi:10.1080/00043079.2016.1143752. JSTOR 43947931. S2CID 193504216.
- Temperini, Renaud (2002). Watteau. Maîtres de l'art (in French). Paris: Gallimard. p. 119, 146, cat. no. 102. ISBN 9782070116867. OCLC 300225840.
- Tillerot, Isabelle (2011). "Engraving Watteau in the Eighteenth Century: Order and Display in the Recueil Jullienne". Getty Research Journal. 3 (3): 33–52. doi:10.1086/grj.3.23005386. eISSN 2329-1249. ISSN 1944-8740. JSTOR 23005386. S2CID 192107598.
- Waagen, G. F. (1870). Die Gemäldesammlung in der Kaiserlichen Eremitage zu St. Petersburg: nebst Bemerkungen über andere dortige Kunstsammlungen (in German) (2nd ed.). St. Petersburg: H. Schmitzdorff. pp. 304–305, cat. no. 1503 – via the Internet Archive.
- Wehle, Harry B. (January 1935). "Le Mezzetin by Antoine Watteau". The Metropolitan Museum of Art Bulletin. 30 (1): 12–18. doi:10.2307/3255436. JSTOR 3255436.
- Weiner, P. P. von [in Russian], ed. (1923). Meisterwerke der Gemäldesammlung in der Eremitage zu Petrograd (in German). München: F. Hanfstaengl. p. 284. OCLC 741513217 – via the Internet Archive.
- Wile, Aaron (September 2014). "Watteau, Reverie, and Selfhood". The Art Bulletin. 96 (3): 319–337. doi:10.1080/00043079.2014.889526. JSTOR 43188883. S2CID 191470371.
- Zimmermann, E. Heinrich [in German] (1912). Watteau: des Meisters Werke in 182 Abbildungen. Klassiker der Kunst (in German). Vol. 21. Stuttgart, Leipzig: Deutsche Verlags-Anstalt. pp. 41, 187. OCLC 561124140.
