= Perfect Harmony (painting) =

Painting by Antoine Watteau

L'Accord parfait
- The Perfect Accord
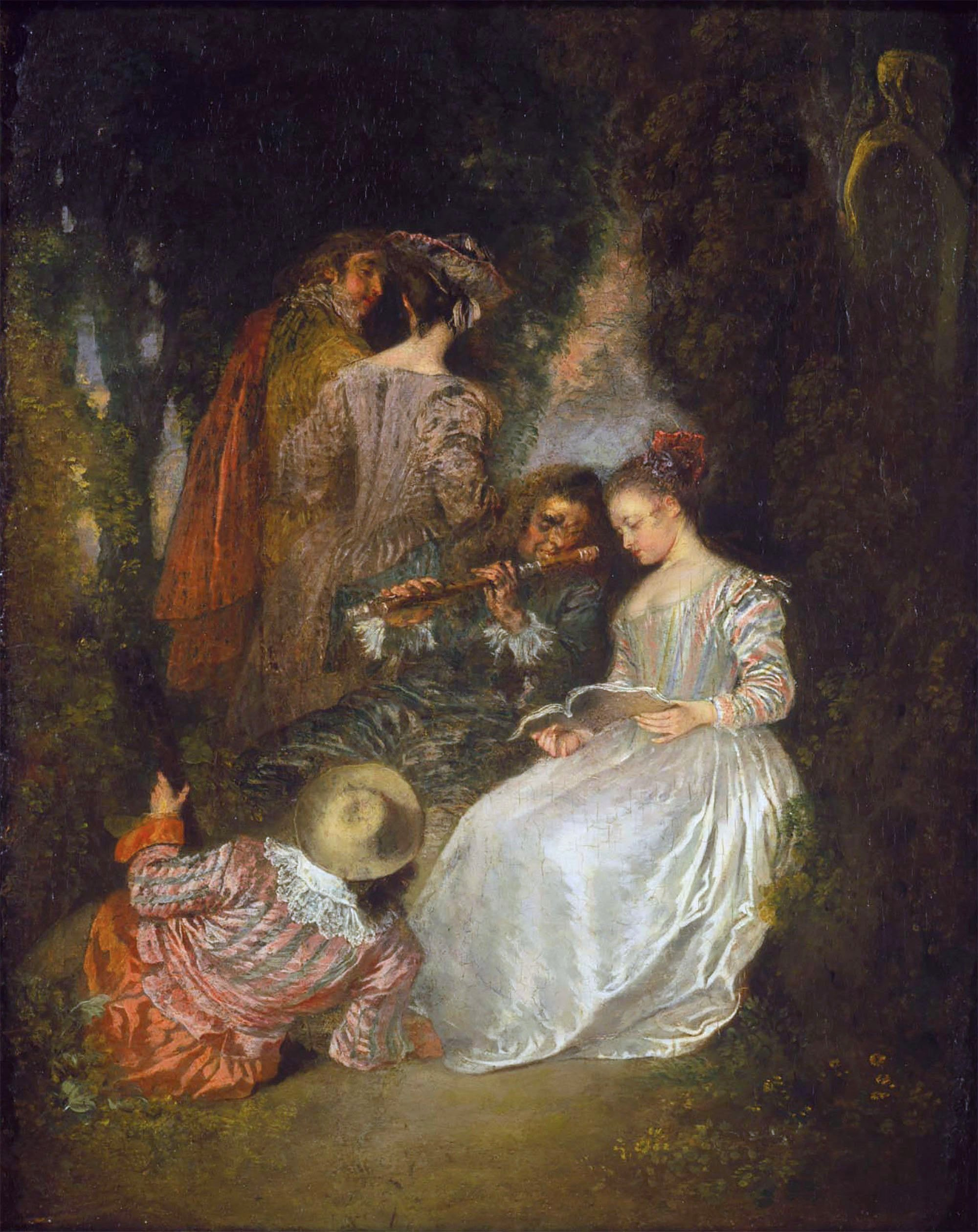
- Artist: Antoine Watteau
- Year: ca. 1719
- Catalogue: H 63 (64); G 97; DV 23; R 118; HA 120; EC 196; F B29; RM 239; RT 106
- Medium: oil on panel
- Dimensions: 35.5 cm × 28 cm (14.0 in × 11 in)
- Location: Los Angeles County Museum of Art, Los Angeles
- Accession: AC1999.18.1

The Perfect Accord (L'Accord parfait), also adapted into English as Perfect Harmony, is an oil-on-panel painting by Antoine Watteau, created c. 1719, now held in the Los Angeles County Museum of Art. It was the pendant to the same artist's The Surprise.

It was initially owned by a friend of the artist, Nicolas Hénin, but it and Surprise were sold separately by his heir around 1756.

== Exhibition history ==
List of exhibitions featuring the work
Year	Title	Location	Cat. no.
1871	Old Masters	Royal Academy of Arts, London	130
1891	Old Masters	Royal Academy of Arts, London	55
1933	Three French Reigns	Sassoon House, London	98
1954–1955	European Masters of the Eighteenth Century	Royal Academy of Arts, London	237
1968	The French Taste in English Painting	Kenwood House, London	12
2004	Watteau et la fête galante	Musée des Beaux-Arts, Valenciennes	56
General reference: Eidelberg 2014
