= Mezzetino =

Fictional character

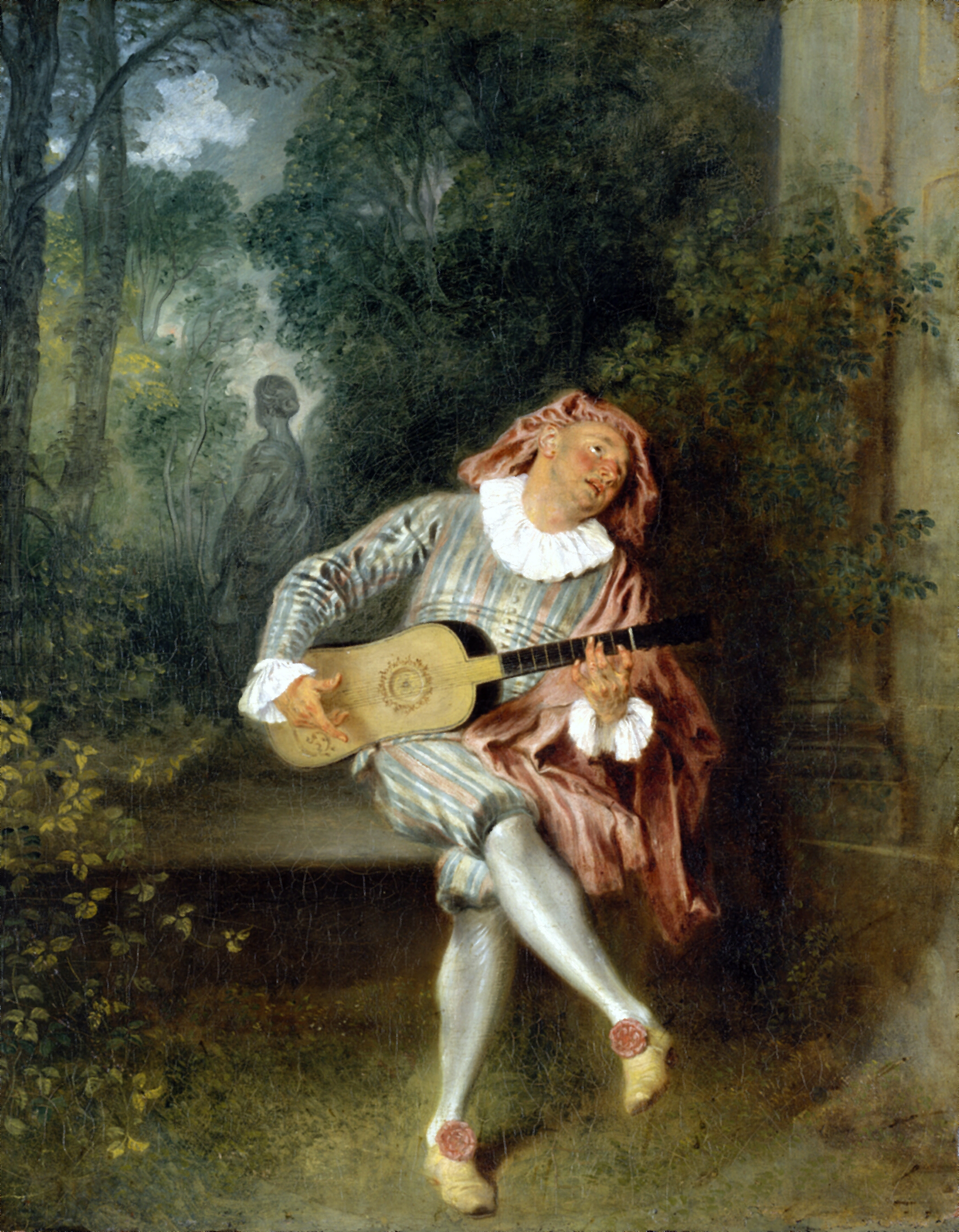
Mezzetino by Antoine Watteau

Mezzetino or Mezzettino (met-zeh-TEE-no) is a character from the commedia dell'arte, and is considered by Duchartre to be a variant on the stock character Brighella. His name means 'Half-Measure (of liquor)' in Medieval Italian, and he is sometimes called in French and English plays "Mezzetin". He first appeared in the 16th century.

Mezzetino is an adept schemer and trouble-maker, willing to commit acts of violence if necessary, but on the whole a little calmer than his brother Brighella, and much more gentle and cultivated, especially in his later life. He is often very musically inclined, and can sing and dance with skill. His character can vary greatly: he can be a loyal servant or simply scheming for his master's downfall; he can be a deceitful husband or be deceived by his wife. He also seems to be rather more interested in the ladies than is Brighella, often coming over as rather creepy in his efforts to flirt.

His costume has gone through similar variations to Brighella's, beginning as a baggy white costume like that worn by the Zanni, but later evolving into a livery or else a tunic and breeches, usually with stripes, and some sort of hat as an accessory. Whereas Brighella's color is green, Mezzetino's is red or burgundy. He is sometimes played without a mask, especially in later versions, after the manner in which Angelo Costantini played him; but when masked it is either brown or rust colored. Callot shows him holding a sword as part of the ensemble. He is also sometimes dressed in a manner that closely resembles the habit of Harlequin, as in the famous Nymphenburg Porcelain, hence some people's belief that he is a variant not on Brighella but on Harlequin. He almost always wears a short cape, called tabaro, which has its origins in the plays of ancient Rome.

== Examples of Mezzetino's character ==
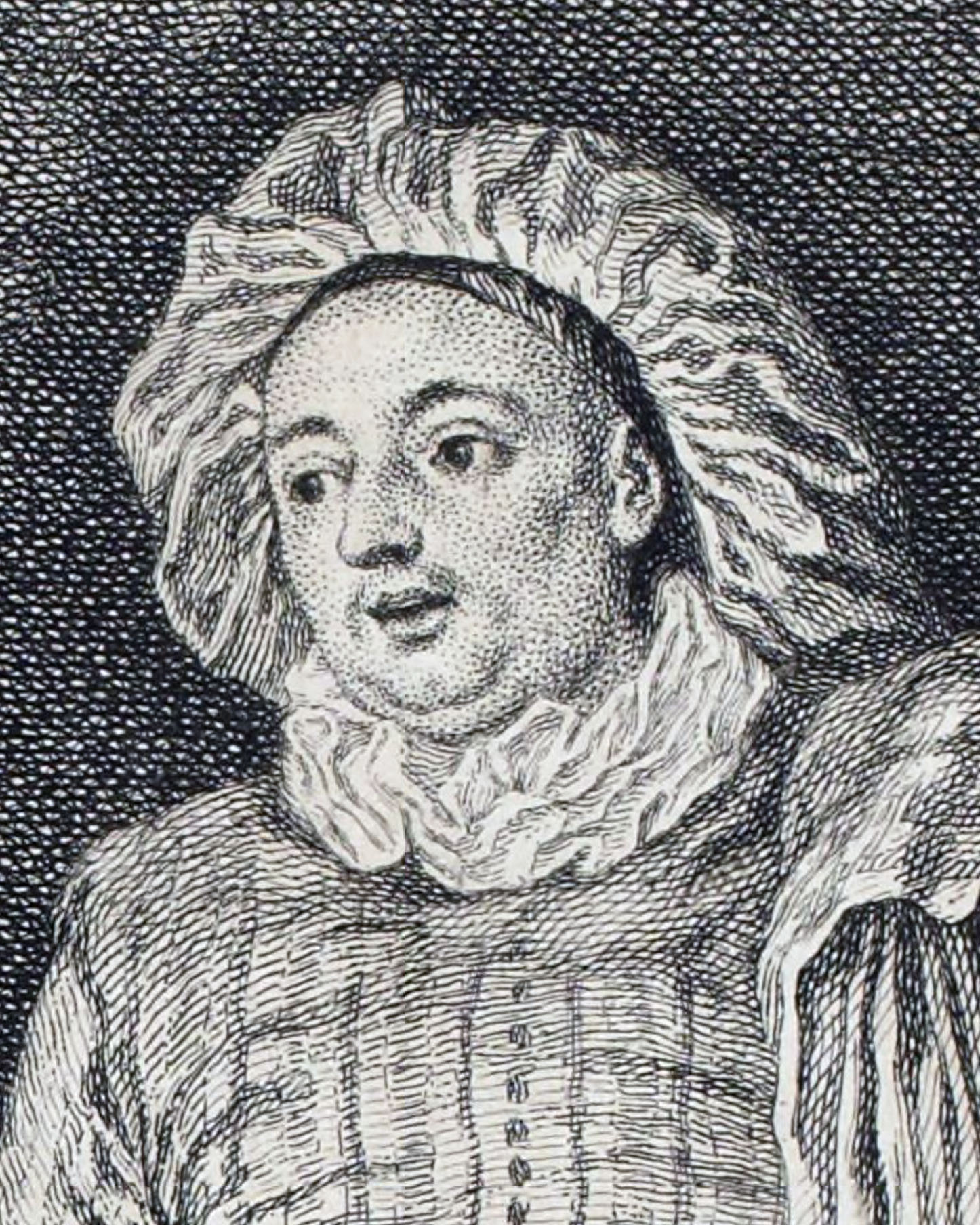
Possible portrait of Luigi Riccoboni in the costume of Mezzetin, detail from L'amour au Théâtre Italien, engraved by Charles-Nicolas Cochin after a painting by Antoine Watteau

In one French play, Mezzetin attempts to flirt with the innamorata Isabelle. He tells her how in 6 years of marriage he and his first wife never had one fight, until she tried to stop him from sneezing, for which act he murdered her. When Isabelle tries to send him away by pointing out that she is herself already married, he points out that so is he, and that "five sous' worth of rat poison will do the trick" to solve that.

Marjorie Bowen, writing as George R Preedy, cast Mezzetin as a character in Homage to the Unknown (Omaggio a la Incognita). This play is included in her work Bagatelle and some other Diversions. In the play Mezzetin remarks, "...We give to the old memories, to the young hopes, to all another illusion either in the past or the future, and if our benefits are not very substantial we never destroy anything, not even the tenderest, sweetest falsehood. Perhaps you want to know who we are? We do not know ourselves. We have a thousand shapes, a thousand names."

== See also ==
- Commedia dell'arte
