= Portrait of an Actor =

Painting by Domenico Fetti

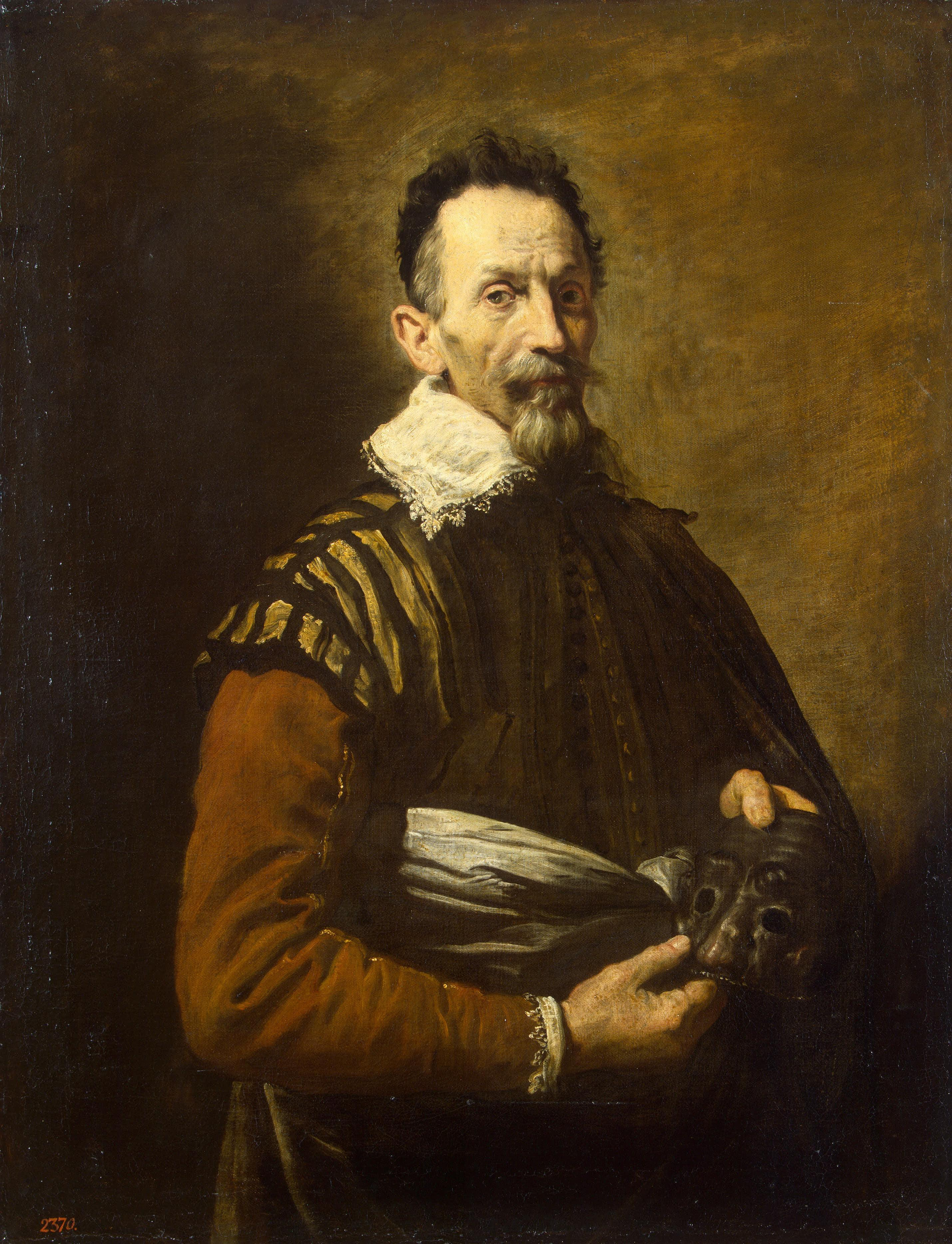
Portrait of an Actor (c. 1621-1622) by Domenico Fetti

Portrait of an Actor (Italian: Ritratto di un attore; French: Portrait de Comédien; Russian: Портрет актера) is a painting by Domenico Fetti in the Hermitage Museum in Saint Petersburg, Russia. It was probably painted in 1621 or 1622 in Mantua, Italy. The sitter, who is holding a theatre mask, is believed to be a commedia dell'arte actor, either Tristano Martinelli or Francesco Andreini. There is a well known copy of the portrait by an unidentified artist in the Gallerie dell'Accademia in Venice.

== Provenance ==
The first record of Fetti's portrait is a 1653 inventory of Cardinal Mazarin's collection at the Palais Mazarin in Paris, where it is described as "Harlequin, sur toile, par Fety [Harlequin, on canvas, by Fetti]". An inventory drawn up after the Cardinal's death in 1661 lists it as item 1266: "Un autre faict par Fety (1), sur toile, représentant Harlequin, comédien, tenant un masque [Another work by Fetti (1), representing Harlequin, actor, holding a mask]". The painting was later in the collection of Pierre Crozat and reproduced as Portrait de Comédien, an engraving by Nicolas de Larmessin in the Recueil Crozat (1729), where it is noted that the actor had been in the service of the Duke of Mantua. It is also mentioned in an inventory made after Crozat's death in 1740 and was inherited by Crozat's nephew, Louis-Antoine Crozat. It was described in a 1755 inventory as a portrait of a "Comédien la tête découverte, tenant un masque d'Arlequin; par le Feti [Actor, head uncovered, holding a Harlequin mask; by Fetti]". After the death of Louis-Antoine Crozat, it was sold by his heir in 1772 to Catherine II of Russia and is mentioned as being in the collection of the Hermitage Museum beginning in 1774.

== Identification of the sitter ==
Since the late 19th century, the identity of the sitter in Fetti's Portrait of an Actor has been a subject of much interest and disagreement. Among the portraits painted by Fetti during his stay at the Gonzaga court of Mantua (1614–1622), few have been identified with certainty, but none of the others have engendered as much attention as this one. Pamela Askew explains: "The reason undoubtedly lies in its impressive power of characterisation and execution. In many respects [it is] the grandest and most penetrating of Fetti's portraits."

=== Former attributions ===
Eduard Safarik, author of a 1990 monograph on Fetti, lists five persons previously proposed by others as the subject of Fetti's painting: the actors Francesco Gabrielli, Giovanni Gabrielli, Giovanni Battista Andreini, and Tristano Martinelli, and the composer Claudio Monteverdi. Of these, apart from Martinelli, only two, Giovanni Gabrielli and Monteverdi gained wide currency.

==== Giovanni Gabrielli ====
Brüiningk and Somoff, editors of the 1891 catalogue of the Hermitage Museum's Gallery of Paintings, identified the subject of Fetti's portrait as the Italian commedia dell'arte actor Giovanni Gabrielli, whom they equated with the much younger subject in Annibale Carracci's Portrait of a Lute Player (c. 1600). The three-way correlation of Fetti's Actor and Annibale's Lute Player with Agostino Carracci's engraved Giovanni Gabrielli (c. 1599) was traced by Denis Mahon, who questioned it in 1947. The errors were compounded in 1962, when Henner Menz, director of the Dresden Gallery, where Annibale's painting is located, gave it the title Portrait of the Lute-player Giovanni Gabrielle and described it as a "picture of a musician", leading to a confusion of the actor with the similarly named Venetian composer Giovanni Gabrieli. These misidentifications lingered, despite Posner's outright rejection of them in 1971, when he named the subject of the Lute Player as a member of the Mascheroni family of Bologna, based on Carlo Cesare Malvasia's description of the sitter in his 1678 book Felsina Pittrice. For example, the popular book, Five Centuries of Music In Venice by H. C. Robbins Landon and John Julius Norwich, published in English, Italian, French, and Japanese, as a companion to the five-part television series Maestro, included a full-page color plate of the Lute Player as a portrait of Gabrieli the composer in 1991. In 1978 Askew strongly supported Posner's identification of the sitter as a member of the Mascheroni family, and more recently the Dresden gallery identified the sitter as Giulio Mascheroni of Bologna.

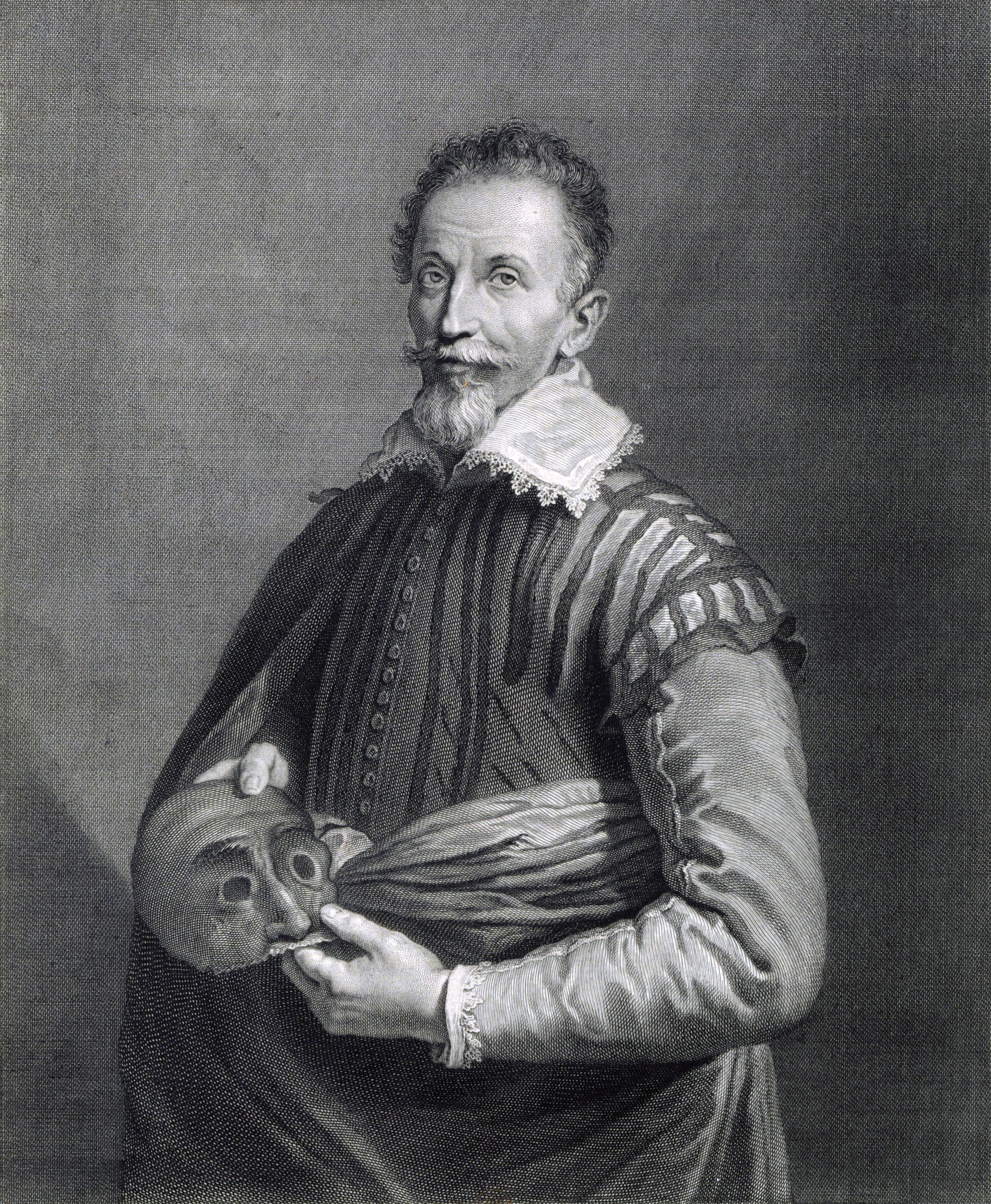
Engraving after Fetti, from the Recueil Crozat, 1729

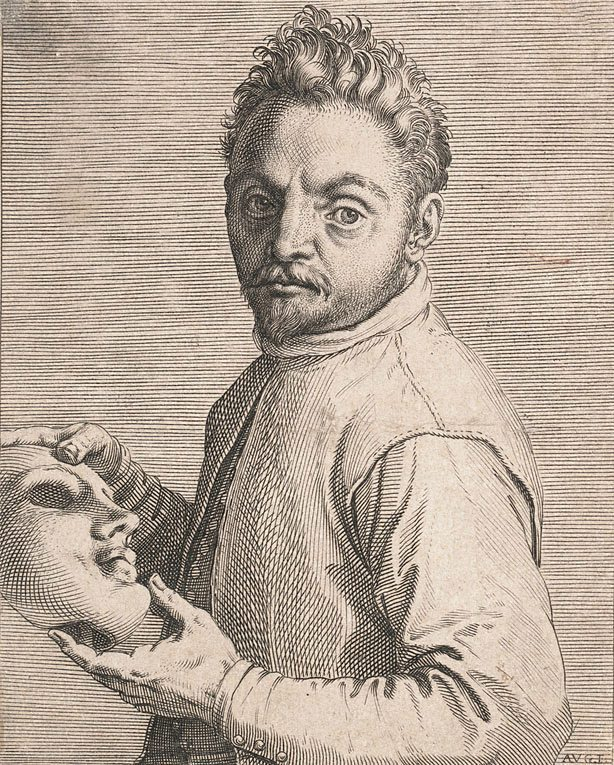
Giovanni Gabrielli, c. 1599, by Agostino Carracci

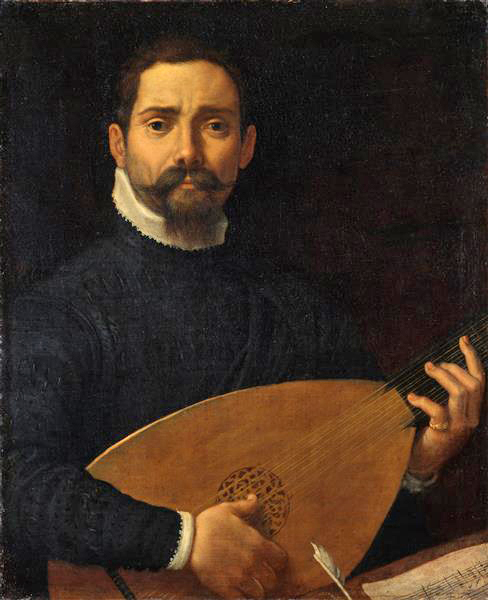
Portrait of a Lute Player by Annibale Carracci, c. 1600 (Dresden)

==== Claudio Monteverdi ====
De Logu suggested the Italian composer Claudio Monteverdi in 1967. However, this attribution has also been rejected.

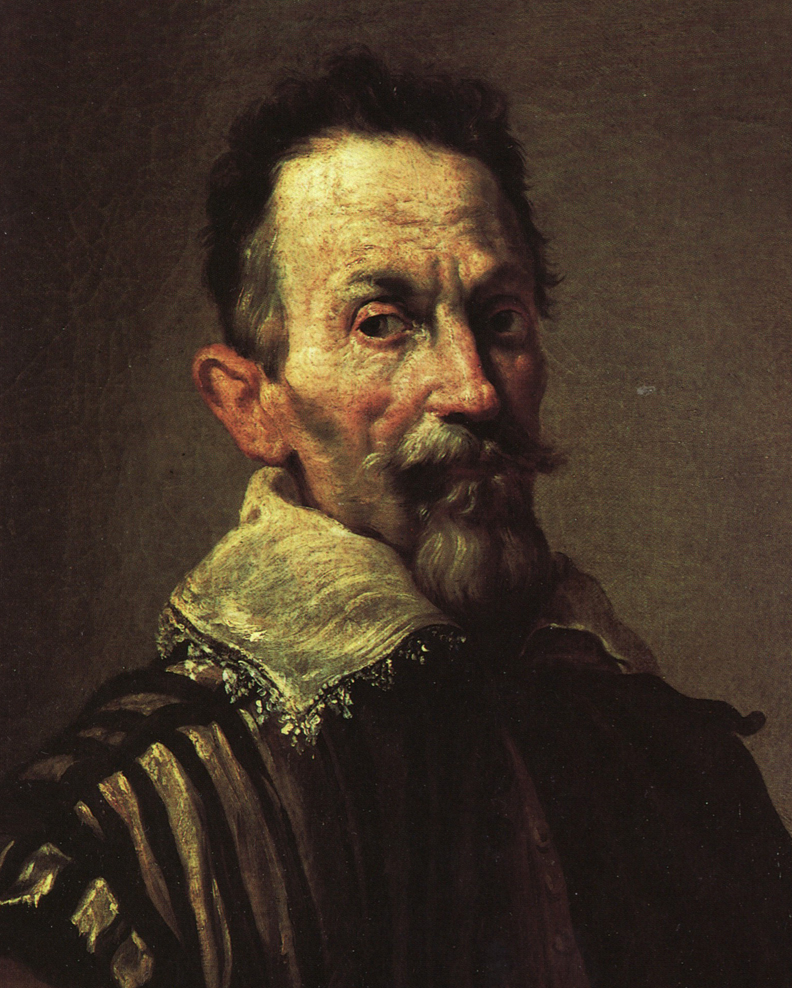
Detail from a copy of Fetti’s Actor (Accademia, Venice)

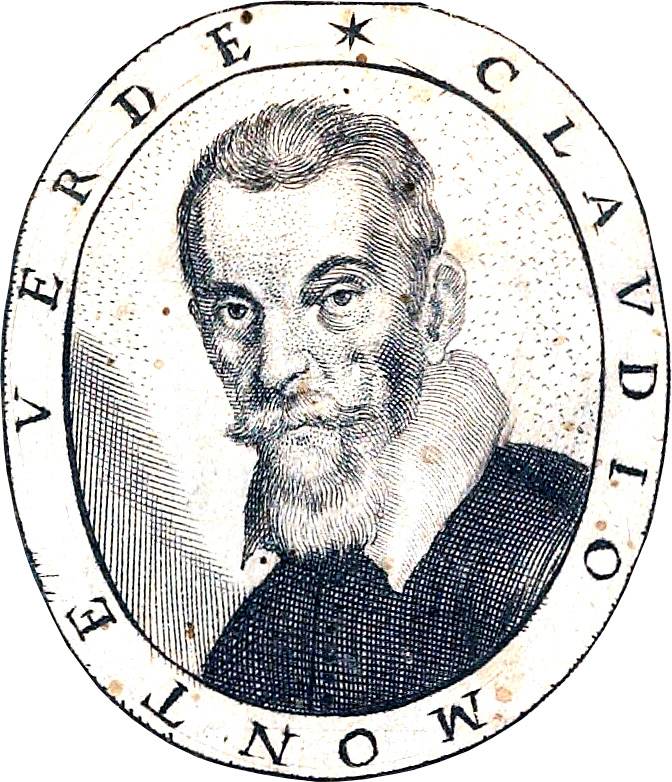
Portrait of Monteverdi from the title page of Fiori poetici, 1644

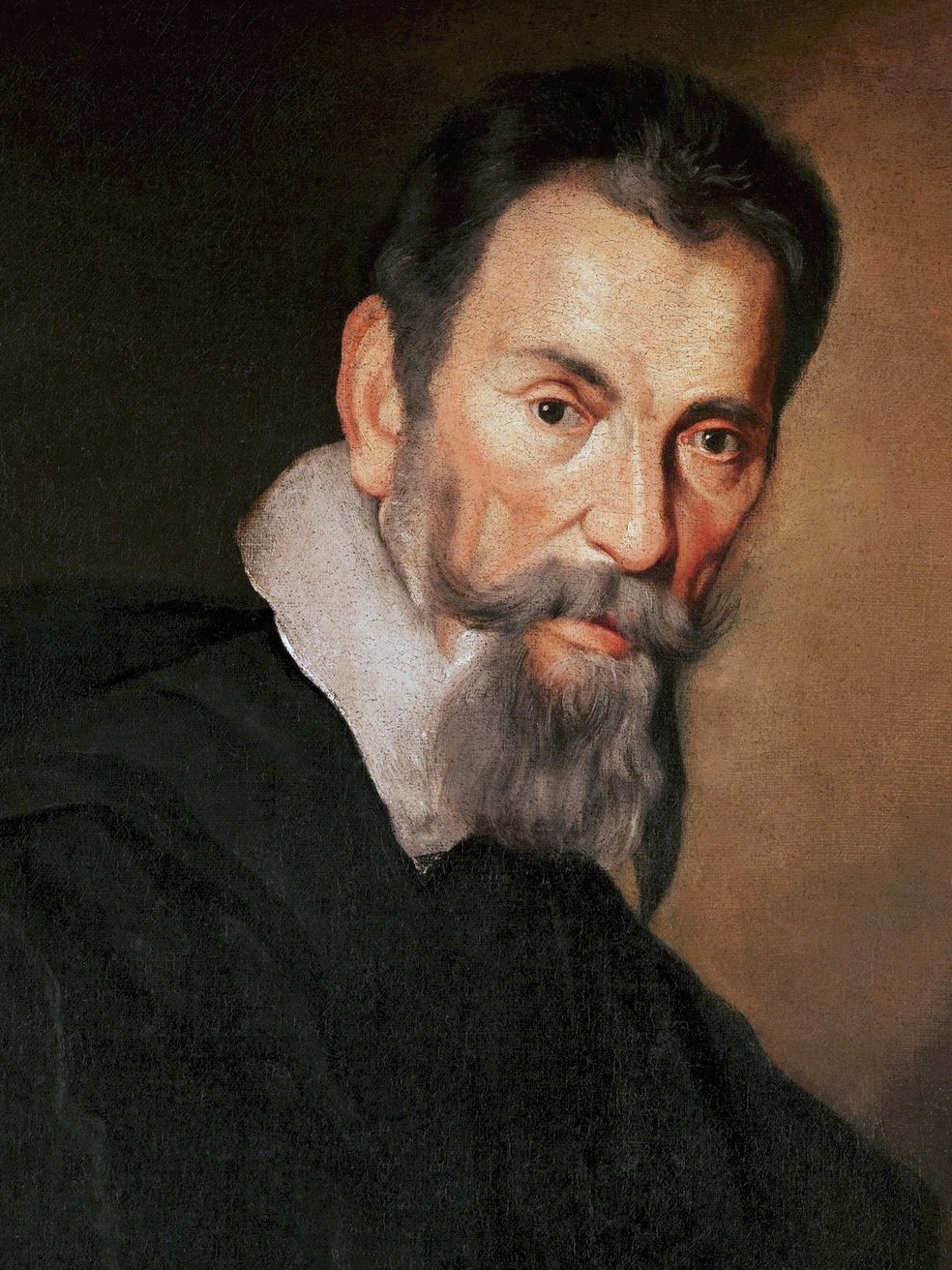
Detail from a portrait of Monteverdi by Strozzi, c. 1630

=== Current attributions ===
==== Tristano Martinelli ====
Askew first suggested Tristano Martinelli in 1954 and published a detailed analysis in The Burlington Magazine in 1978. Martinelli, probably the first actor to use the name Harlequin for the masked secondo zanni role, and the most famous Harlequin up to the time of his death in 1630, commissioned numerous dramatic portraits of himself, three of which he sent to France when he was wanting to return to that country in 1626. One may have been Fetti's portrait, later acquired by Mazarin. The association of the name Martinelli with the portrait was first documented in 1912, when a copy in pastel, attributed to Fragonard (1732–1806), was sold in Paris as Portrait de l'auteur et acteur Martinelli.

==== Francesco Andreini ====
The Fetti scholar Eduard Safarik proposed the Italian actor Francesco Andreini as the subject of Fetti's portrait in 1990. Andreini began his career as the innamorato (male lover) and later became famous in the role of Capitano Spavento da Vall'Inferna. He also sometimes played the Sicilian Doctor, the shepherd Corinto, and the necromancer Falsirone. Safarik's attribution is based on a comparison of Fetti's portrait (and a drawing, presumably a study for the portrait) to the frontispiece of Andreini's Le Bravure di Capitano Spavento, engraved by Abraham Tummerman and first published in 1609 in Venice. The Hermitage painting was shown with the title Portrait of Fancesco Andreini at a 1996 exhibit (organized by Safarik) at the Palazzo Te in Mantua.

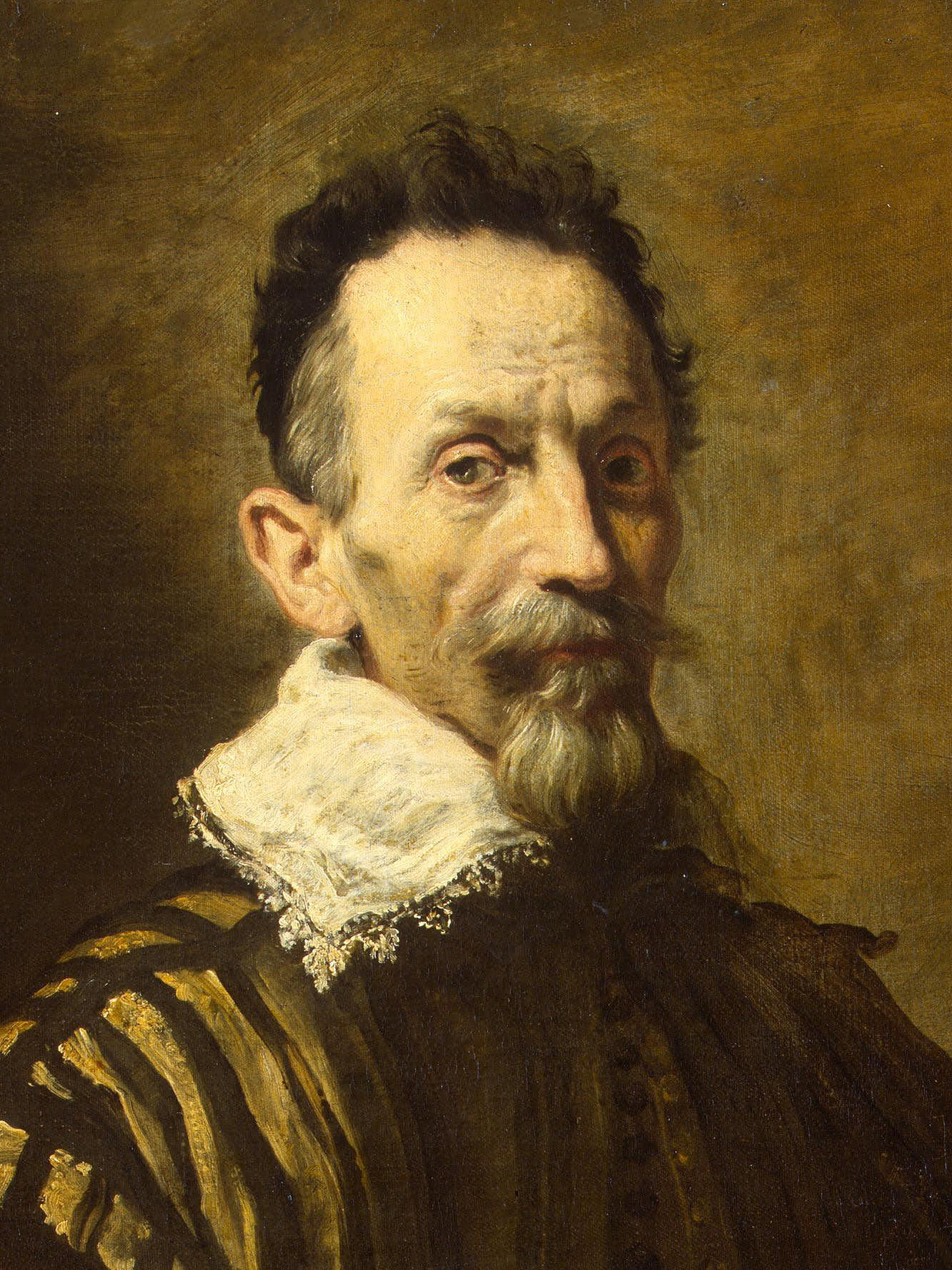
Detail of the portrait (Hermitage Museum)

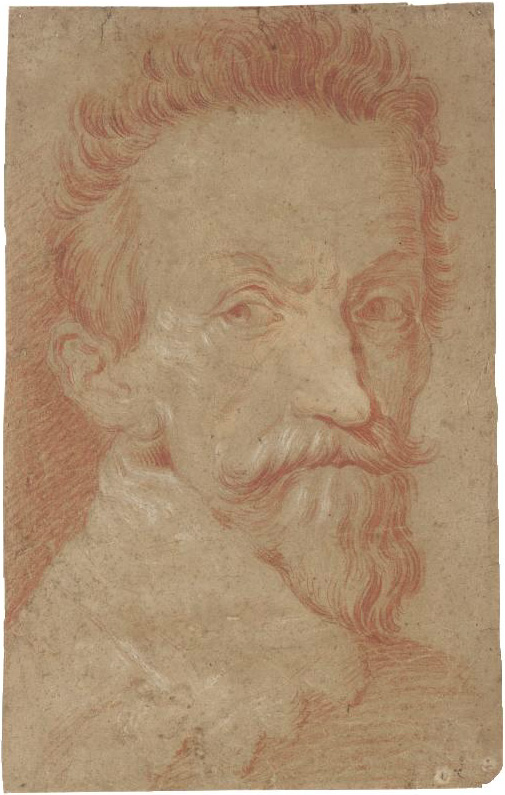
Drawing for the portrait (sold by Sotheby's)

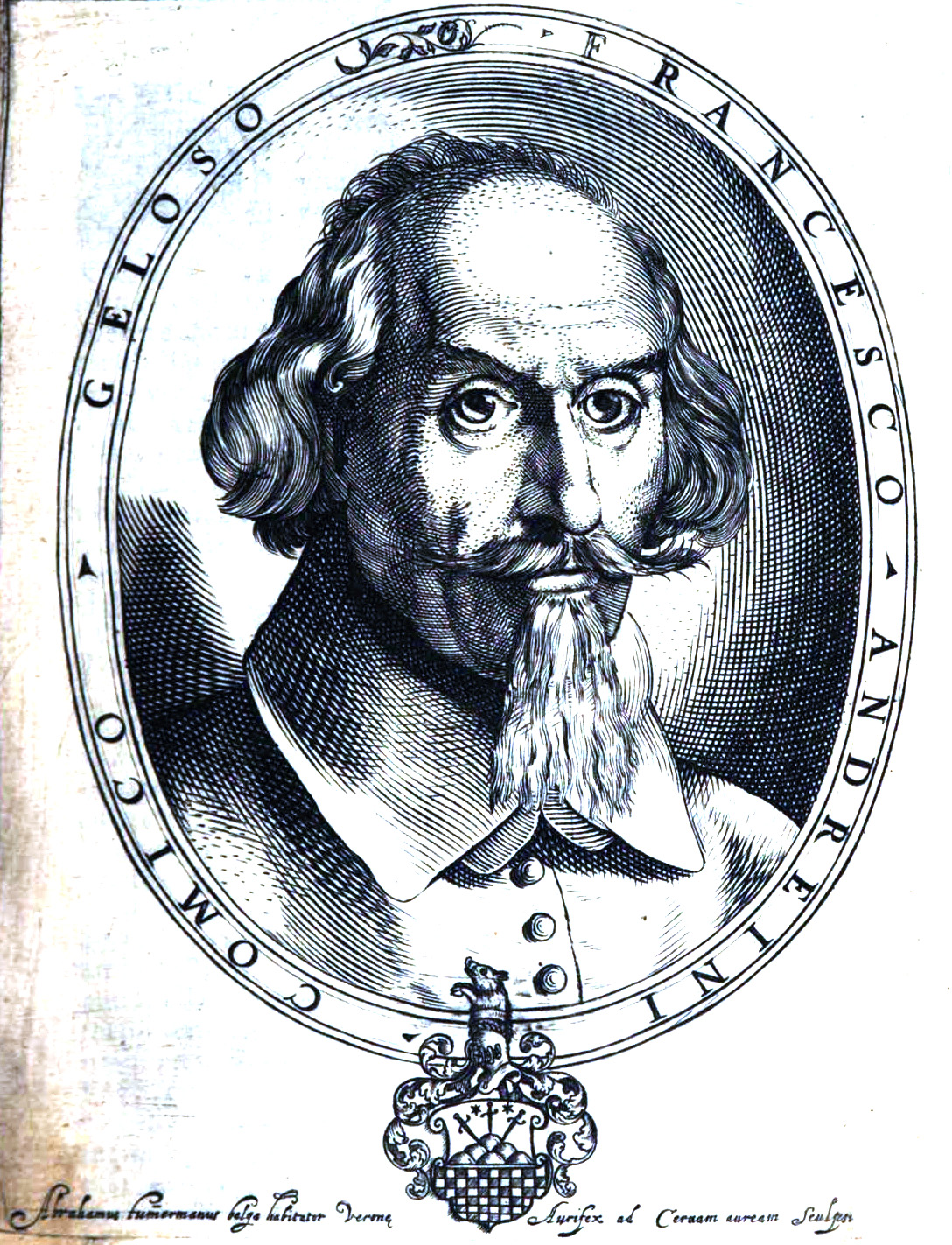
Frontispiece to Francesco Andreini's Le Bravure di Capitano Spavento, 1607

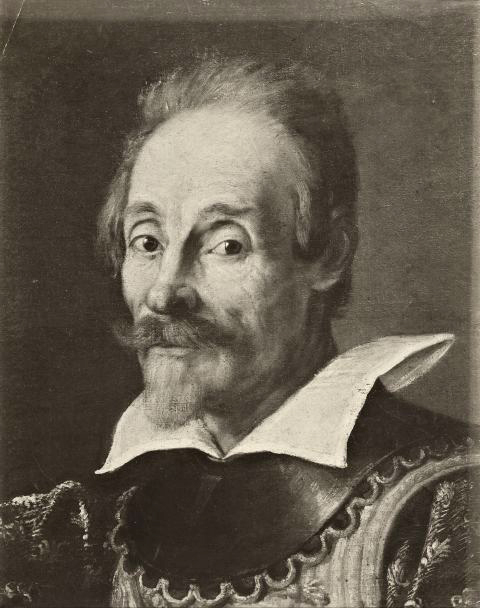
Detail of Portrait of Francesco Andreini as Capitano Spavento, c. 1620–1625

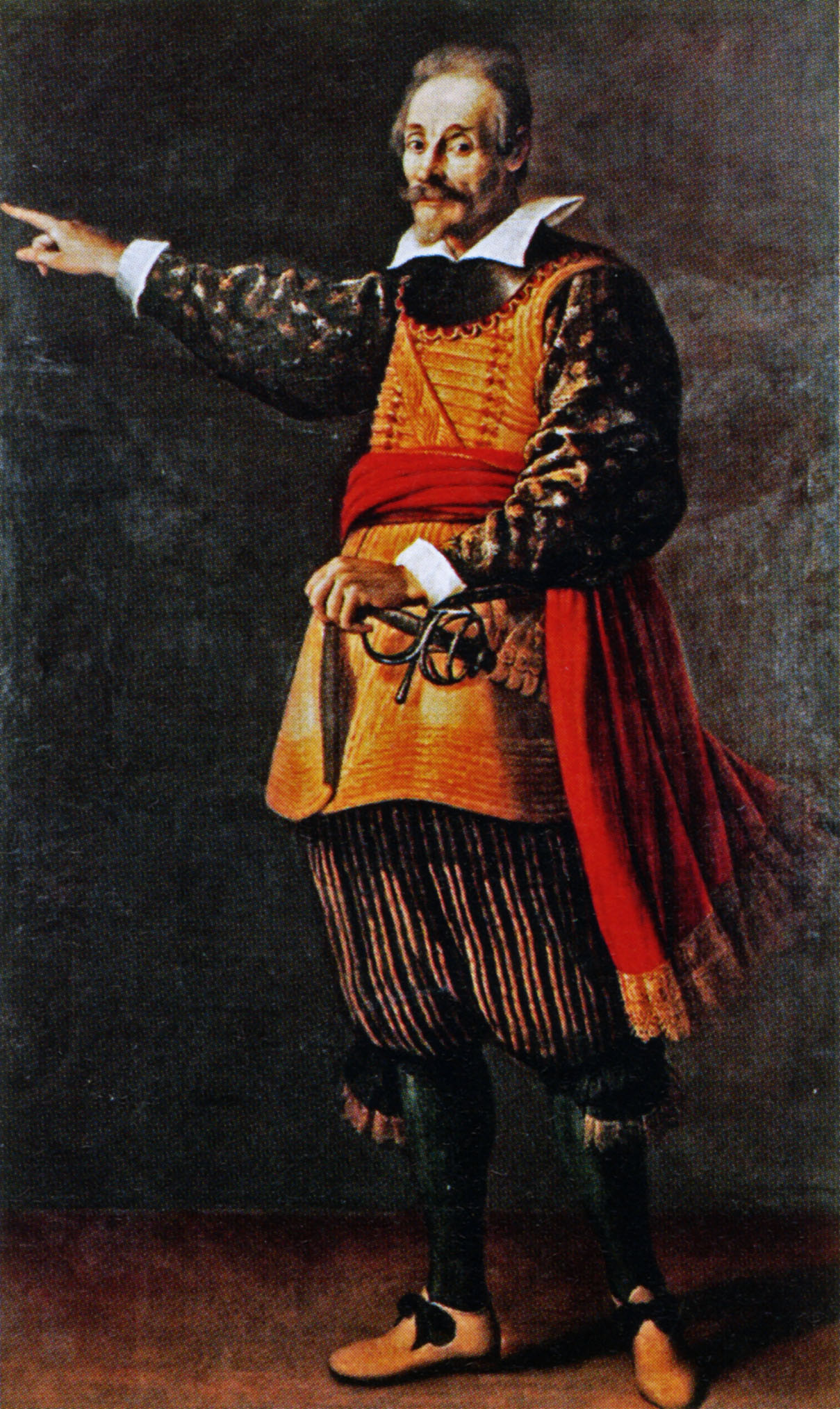
Portrait of Francesco Andreini as Capitano Spavento

==== Museum attributions ====
In 2015 the curators of the Hermitage Museum identified the subject of Fetti's painting as either Tristano Martinelli or Francesco Andreini, but these attributions were subsequently removed. The British Museum, which has a print of the engraving from the Recueil Crozat (1729), identified the subject as Francesco Andreini.

== Bibliography ==
- Aikema, Bernard (1997). "Fetti. Mantua" (review of an exhibition held in 1996 in Mantua), The Burlington Magazine, vol. 139, no. 1127 (February), pp. 142–144. JSTOR 887302.
- Askew, Pamela (1954). "Domenico Fetti", thesis presented at the Courtauld Institute of Art, University of London. OCLC 757139605.
- Askew, Pamela (1978). "Fetti's 'Portrait of an Actor' Reconsidered", The Burlington Magazine, vol. 120, no. 899 (February), pp. 59–65. JSTOR 879098.
- Aumale, Henri d'Orléans, Duke of (1861). Inventaire de tous les meubles du Cardinal Mazarin. Dressé en 1653, et publié d'après l'original, conserve dans les Archives de Condé. London: Whittingham & Wilkins. Copy at Google Books.
- Baschet, Armand (1882). Les comédiens italiens à la cour de France sous Charles IX, Henri III, Henri IV et Louis XIII. Paris: Plon. View at Google Books.
- British Museum: "Portrait de comédien (Portrait of Francesco Andreini, after Fetti), etching and engraving" at the British Museum website, accessed 29 January 2015.
- Brüiningk, E.; Somoff, A. (1891). Ermitage Impérial. Catalogue de la Galerie des Tableuux. I. Les écoles d'Italie et d'Espagne, third edition. Saint Petersburg: Imprimerie de la Cour Impériale. Copy at Gallica.
- Cosnac, Gabriel-Jules, comte de (1884). Les richesses du Palais Mazarin. Paris: Librairie Renouard. 1884 edition at Gallica; 1885 edition at Google Books.
- De Logu, Giuseppe (1967). "An unknown Portrait of Monteverdi by Domenico Feti", The Burlington Magazine, vol. 109, no. 777 (December), pp. 706–709. JSTOR 875498.
- Duchartre, Pierre-Louis (1929; reprint 1966). The Italian Comedy, translated by Randolph T. Weaver. London: George G. Harrap (1929). OCLC 1335281. New York: Dover (1966). ISBN 9780486216799.
- Hermitage Museum: "Fetti, Domenico – Portrait of an Actor (Tristano Martinelli or Francesco Andreini ?)" at the Hermitage Museum website, accessed 29 January 2015.
- Katritzky, M. A. (2006). The Art of Commedia: A Study in the Commedia Dell'Arte 1560-1620 with Special Reference to the Visual Records. Amsterdam: Rodopi. ISBN 9789042017986.
- La Curne de Sainte-Palaye, Jean-Baptiste de (1755). Catalogue des tableaux du cabinet de M. Crozat, baron de Thiers. Paris: de Bure aîné. Copy at Gallica.
- Landon, H. C. Robbins; Norwich, John Julius (1991). Five Centuries of Music in Venice. London: Thames and Hudson. ISBN 9780500015032. Listings at WorldCat.
- Lehmann, Jürgen M. (1967). Domenico Fetti. Leben und Werk des römischen Malers, thesis (doctoral), Frankfurt a. M. OCLC 123148084.
- Mahon, Denis (1947; reprint 1971). Studies in Seicento Art and Theory. London: Warburg Institute, University of London (1947). OCLC 1966882. Westport, Connecticut: Greenwood (1971). ISBN 9780837147437.
- Malvasia, Carlo Cesare (1678). Felsina Pittrice. Vite de pittori bolognesi, 2 volumes. Bologna: Domenico Barbieri. Digitized versions at HathiTrust of copies from the Getty Research Institute.
- Menz, Henner (1962). The Dresden Gallery, translated from the German by Daphne Woodward. New York: Harry N. Abrams. OCLC 592334.
- Posner, Donald (1971). Annibale Carracci: A Study in the Reform of Italian Painting Around 1590, 2 volumes. New York: Phaidon. ISBN 9780714814711.
- Possenti, E. (1964). "Gli attori del teatro di prosa, in Il museo teatrale alla Scala, edited by Giampiero Tintori. Milan: Edizioni del Museo Teatrale alla Scala. OCLC 1197054.
- Recueil d'estampes (1729, 1742). Full title: Recueil d'estampes d'après les plus beaux tableaux et d'après les plus beaux dessins, qui sont en France dans le cabinet du Roy, dans celuy de Mgr le Duc d'Orléans, & dans d'autres cabinets, divisé suivant les différentes écoles, avec un abbrégé de la vie des peintres et une description historique de chaque tableau. Paris: Imprimerie royale. vol. 1, part 1 (1729), vol. 1, part 2 (1729), and vol. 2 (1742) at Gallica.
- Richards, Kenneth; Richards, Laura (1990). The Commedia Dell'Arte: A Documentary History. Oxford: Basil Blackwell. ISBN 9780631195900.
- Safarik, Eduard A. (1990). Fetti. Milan: Electa. ISBN 9788843532650.
- Safarik, Eduard A. (1996). Domenico Fetti 1588/89–1623 (catalog for an exhibition in Mantua, 15 September – 15 December 1996, edited by Electa, curated by Eduard Safarik). Milan: Electa. ISBN 9788843557776.
- Savoia, Francesca (2008). "Francesco Andreini", pp. 9–15 in Seventeenth-Century Italian Poets and Dramatists. Dictionary of Literary Biography, volume 339, edited by Albert N. Mancini and Glenn Palen Pierce. Detroit: Gale Cengage Learning. ISBN 9780787681579.
- Schuetze, George C. (2005). Convergences in Music & Art: A Bibliographic Study. Warren, Michigan: Harmonie Park Press. ISBN 9780899901305.
- Smith, Winifred (1930). Italian Actors of the Renaissance. New York: Coward-McCann. OCLC 1128123, 852838084.
- Somof, Andrej Ivanov (1899). Ermitage Impérial. Catalogue de la Galerie des Tableuux. I. Les écoles d'Italie et d'Espagne. Saint Petersburg: Compagnie d'Imprimerie artistique. OCLC 739496464. 1909 edition (Imprimerie A. Böhnke) at Gallica.
- Sotheby's (2007). Sotheby's, New York, 24 January 2007, lot 37, accessed 29 January 2015.
- Stevens, Denis (1994). "Martinelli, Not Monteverdi", Early Music, vol. 22, no. 1, Monteverdi II (February), pp. 185–186. JSTOR 3128507.
- Stuffmann, Margaret (1968). Les tableaux de la collection de Pierre Crozat, Paris: Gazette des Beaux-Arts. OCLC 27092484.
