= Tristano Martinelli =

Italian actor

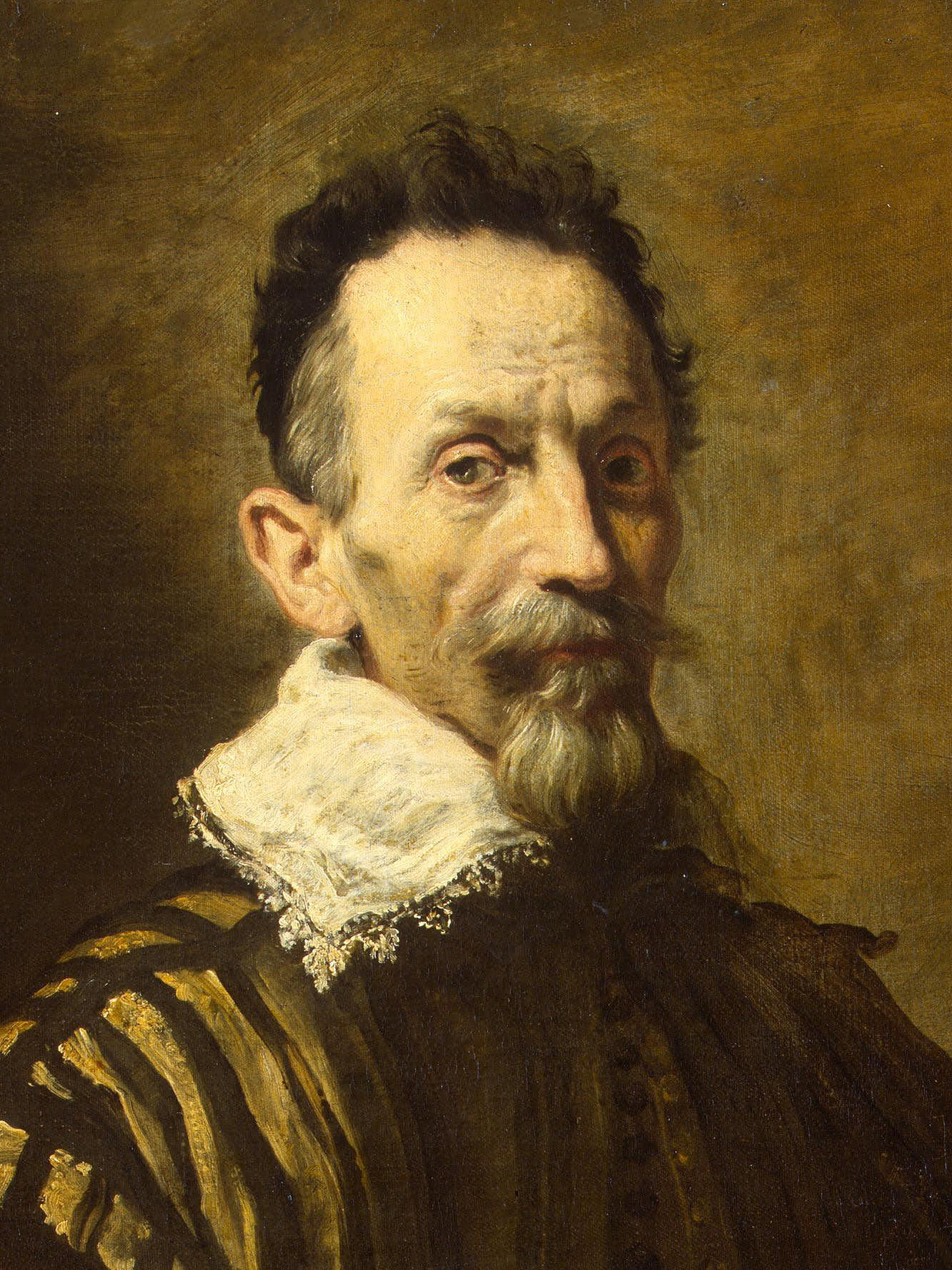
Detail from Portrait of an Actor by Domenico Fetti (c. 1621–1622, Hermitage Museum, Saint Petersburg), identified as Tristano Martinelli or Francesco Andreini

Tristano Martinelli (c. 1556 – 1630), called Dominus Arlecchinorum, the "Master of Harlequins", was an Italian actor in the commedia dell'arte tradition. He is probably the first actor to use the name "Harlequin" for the secondo ("second") Zanni role.

== Biography ==
Martinelli was active in France in 1584 to 1585, where he presumably first acted in his Arlequin role. There is no mention of the Arlequin, Arlecchino, or Harlequin character prior to Martinelli's time in Paris.

Arlecchino first clearly appears in Martinelli's 1601 publication Compositions de Rhetorique, yet Tristano Martinelli would follow his name in 1590s signatures with "'detto Arlechino comico', or 'alias Arlechino'".

For the Carnival of 1584, he picked a name taken from French folklore, the devil Herlequin, for his performance to a Parisian audience. His character wore a linen costume of colourful patches, and a hare-tail on his cap to indicate cowardice, a black leather half-mask, a moustache and a pointed beard. It is also plausible that Martinelli used a tail or plume to imitate the style of the Bergamask people native to the region where Arlecchino is typically depicted as being from.

He chose the name Harlequin (Arlequin) after the name of the popular French devil character it resembled. The name Herlequin likely came from Helle-kin, an Old French derivative of the Germanic Erlkönig (Elf-King), or from Schar der Hölle (Host of Hell), which became Höllen-Kind (Child of Hell).

Martinelli became attached to the Mantuan court of Duke Ferdinando I Gonzaga, with a regular stipend, about 1596–97. Within a few years he was overseeing all the professional acting troupes in the Gonzaga territories. Martinelli, in service of the Duke, acted as both police and a tax collector for the actors and other street performers and merchants. A decree from the Duke mandated that Arlecchino and Martinelli were superior to all other performers and street vendors, and that all were required to have a license from Tristano in order to perform, lest they be heavily fined. It was also declared that Arlecchino would act as a supervisor for public events as the Duke's personal representative.

Martinelli's personality and the appeal of his character created tension with other players, particularly the Andreini, who felt that he was usurping the innamorati's traditional position at the top of the hierarchy. Virginia Ramponi, a renowned actress in her own right, wrote to a Cardinal in 1611 to demand that Martinelli not be granted a license to create his own theatrical company, as she believed it would be purely self-serving.

He was the most famous harlequin of his generation, pressed to divide his time between Mantua and the court of France. Martinelli played Arlecchino for several famous companies, including La Compagnia Dei Desiosi, La Compagnia Degli Accesi, and I Confidenti. He is documented as having toured in Italy, France, Spain, Austria, and Bohemia. He and his brother, Drusiano are first recorded in Spain as early as 1587, along with Drusiano's wife. They joined with a troupe called I Accesi by 1599 and played for Henri IV in 1601, then returned to Mantua. On their way to Paris, I Accesi were held in Turin for quite a while, as the Savoyard Duke was so enamored with their performance. Marie de' Medici urged him to return to Paris in 1611; after some careful advance publicity he arrived in Paris and played for the court from August 1613 to July 1614. The Italian players were immensely popular in Paris, with Tristano writing that, "The comedy was most successful, contrary to all expectation; but they are wild about comedies here so everything seems good." Louis XIII was willing to hold the child at the christening of one of Martinelli's children in 1614. They returned to Italy in 1614, where Martinelli remained until 1620.

Martinelli returned in 1621 to play for the court of Louis XIII and remained in Paris through 1624, going so far as to accompany the King to Fontainebleau and back. His company is recorded to have had 10-11 members in 1621. I Fideli, likely the last company Martinelli worked with, lasted into the 1640s included among its ranks Francesco Andreini's first wife, Virginia Ramponi. Martinelli is known to have addressed himself later in life as Dominus Arlequinorum (Greatest of the Harlequins).

Martinelli commissioned numerous dramatic portraits of himself, three of which he sent to France when wishing to return to that country in 1626. One may have been Portrait of an Actor by Domenico Fetti, since Cardinal Mazarin had the painting in his collection.
