= Francesco Bernardi (painter) =

Italian painter

Francesco Bernardi, also known as Bigolaro (flourished first half of the 17th century) was an Italian painter of the early Baroque period. A native of Verona, he was a pupil of Domenico Feti and painted historical subjects.
