= Lucrina Fetti =

Italian artist (c. 1590 – c. 1673)

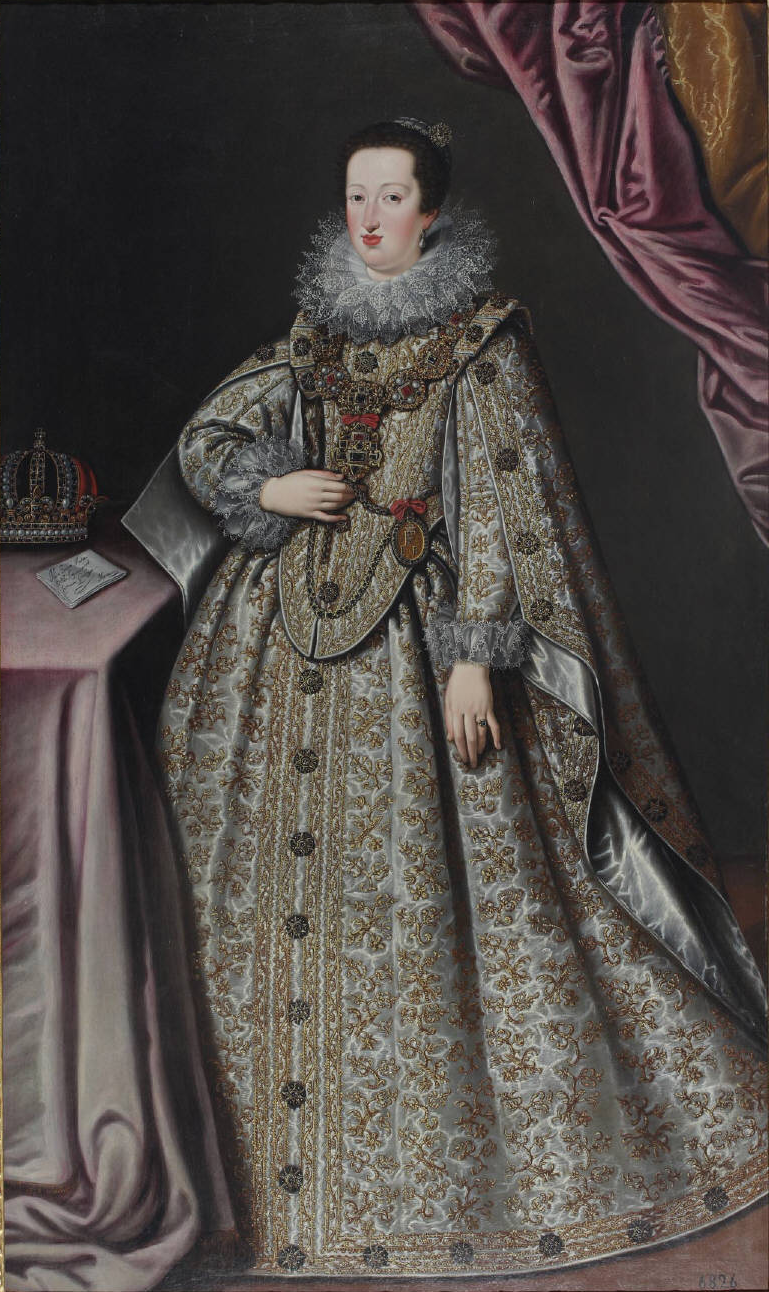
Portrait of Eleonora Gonzaga, by Lucrina Fetti.

Lucrina Fetti (c. 1590 – c. 1673) was an Italian painter born in Rome under the name Giustina. She was the daughter of a lesser-known painter, Pietro Fetti, and the sister and pupil of the more distinguished painter of the family, Domenico Fetti. She accompanied her family to Mantua when her brother was invited to be court painter to Ferdinando Gonzaga, Duke of Mantua. On December 3, 1614, Duke Ferdinando exclusively gave Giustina a dowry of 150 scudi so she could become a Clarissan nun in the Convent of St. Ursula. Once she entered the convent, she chose to change her name to "Lucrina". She was known for her religious works from her family's workshop. They were mostly meant for decorations for the church and convent that were sponsored by Margherita Gonzaga, Duchess of Ferrara. She was also known for doing portraits of the women of the Gonzaga family.

== Lucrina and Her Art ==
After entering the convent, Lucrina lived there for the rest of her life either painting decorations for the convent or painting portraits of the princesses who were raised there. She learned how to paint from her brother, Domenico. He was a male family member who was already artistically trained, so it was common for him to pass down his knowledge onto his family. However, since she became a nun, her sheltered lifestyle provided her with limited resources to visual models, artistic training, and documentary sources to record her personal life. It was only until recently that scholars were able to gather a complete collection of Lucrina's work since most of her work was mixed up with her brother's work.

Lucrina painted these portraits solely for the convent without expecting any financial compensation for her work. This situation was very typical for nun-painters. Her paintings fell under two categories, either portraits or works on religious subjects. It was determined that she made more religious works than portraits. There were about ten religious works that were found throughout the convent's external church that were made by or partly made by Lucrina. Most were found in the chapel dedicated to Saint Margaret, while the rest were found on the chapel walls. They all portrayed the life of Christ. These included “The Annunciation”, “Visitation”, and “Adoration of the Shepherds”. They were also inscribed with the abbreviation “S.L.F.R.F.S.O” or “Suor Lucrina Fetti Romana fece in Sant’Orsola” and the date 1629. The mediocre quality of the paintings implied a sharp decline of artistic development since her brother died six years earlier.

Her second group of paintings, portraits of the women of the Gonzaga family, was highly considered by Margherita Gonzaga and she commissioned many paintings from Lucrina. However, her painting had a greater increase in quality after Margherita's death in 1618. For instance, it was widely known that portraits of important women demanded careful attention to detail and a thorough visual record of the model's costume and accessories. These two qualities were clearly evident in Lucrina's portrait of Eleonora Gonzaga during her marriage to Emperor Ferdinando II. Some other portraits she did included Margherita Gonzaga when she was a widow and Caterina de’ Medici Gonzaga with a striking resemblance to Saint Helena.

== Other skills ==
When Lucrina was not providing paintings for the church, she spent the remaining time supporting the convent by taking care of inheritance claims that were associated with Domenico. Ten years after Magherita's death in 1618 financial strains were brought upon the convent. However, Lucrina was able to demonstrate that she had some economic and political knowledge by representing Sant’Orsola and winning appeals for the ownership of family properties. She died around 1673, spending nearly sixty years serving the convent as a nun, painter and economic negotiator.

== Works ==
- "Annunciation", the Museum of Palazzo Ducale, Mantua
- Portrait of "Eleanor Gonzaga" (1598–1655) wife of Ferdinand II (1578–1637), Holy Roman Emperor
- Portrait of "Archangel Gabriel of the Annunciation", 1651, Museum of Palazzo Ducale, Mantua
