= Pamela Askew =

American art historian (1925–1997)

- Born: February 2, 1925; Poughkeepsie, New York, U.S.
- Died: June 24, 1997 (aged 72); Poughkeepsie, New York, U.S.
- Awards: ACLS Fellowship (1965); CAA Distinguished Teaching Award for Art History (1988)

Academic background
- Education: Vassar College; Courtauld Institute of Art

Academic work
- Main interests: Art history
- Notable works: Caravaggio's 'Death of the Virgin' (Princeton, 1990)

Pamela Askew (February 2, 1925 – June 24, 1997) was an American art historian who wrote influential works on Domenico Fetti and Caravaggio.

Askew's father was Arthur McComb, Professor of baroque art at Vassar College and Harvard University, and author of the influential Agnolo Bronzino: His Life and Works (1928). She grew up in New York City with her mother, Constance, and step-father, R. Kirk Askew Jr., a Park Avenue art dealer.

She did undergraduate studies at Vassar College, followed by an MA in Art History at the New York University Institute of Fine Arts, with a thesis on Perino del Vaga. She took her Ph.D. from the Courtauld Institute of Art, London, in 1954, under Johannes Wilde with work on Domenico Fetti.

On March 26, 1955, she married Timothy John Oswald Mosley, an Englishman educated at Eton College, who had served in the Coldstream Guards. She returned to teach at Vassar, becoming a full professor in 1969. She died of lymphoma in 1997.

== Selected works ==
=== Books ===
- Askew, Pamela (1990). Caravaggio's Death of the Virgin. Princeton New Jersey: Princeton University Press. ISBN 978-0691039831.
- Askew, Pamela (1984). Claude Lorrain 1600–1682: a symposium. Washington: National Gallery of Art.
- Askew, Pamela (1953). Domenico Fetti. London, UK: University of London (Courtauld Institute of Art).

=== Scholarly articles ===
- Askew, Pamela (June 1978). "Ferdinando Gonzaga's Patronage of the Pictorial Arts: The Villa Favorita". The Art Bulletin. 60 (2): 274–96. doi:10.2307/3049783. JSTOR 3049783.
- Askew, Pamela (February 1978). "Fetti's 'Portrait of an Actor' Reconsidered". The Burlington Magazine. 120 (899): 59–65. JSTOR 879098.
- Askew, Pamela (1969). "The Angelic Consolation of St. Francis of Assisi in Post-Tridentine Italian Painting". Journal of the Warburg and Courtauld Institutes. 32: 280–306. doi:10.2307/750615. JSTOR 750615.
- Askew, Pamela (June 1961). "Fetti's 'Martyrdom' at the Wadsworth Atheneum". The Burlington Magazine. 103 (699): 245–252. JSTOR 873330.
- Askew, Pamela (March 1961). "The Parable Paintings of Domenico Fetti". The Art Bulletin. 43 (1). College Art Association: 21–45. doi:10.2307/3047929. JSTOR 3047929.
