= Johann Liss =

German painter

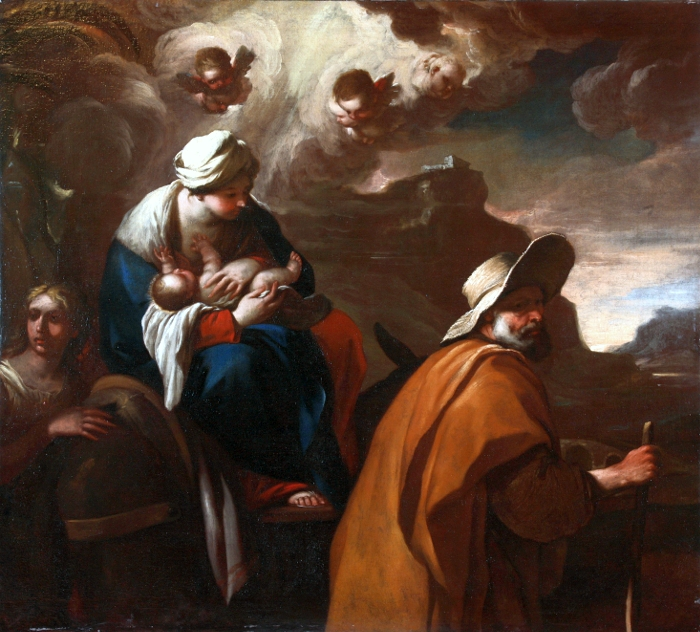
The Flight into Egypt, Palace of the Kraków Bishops in Kielce

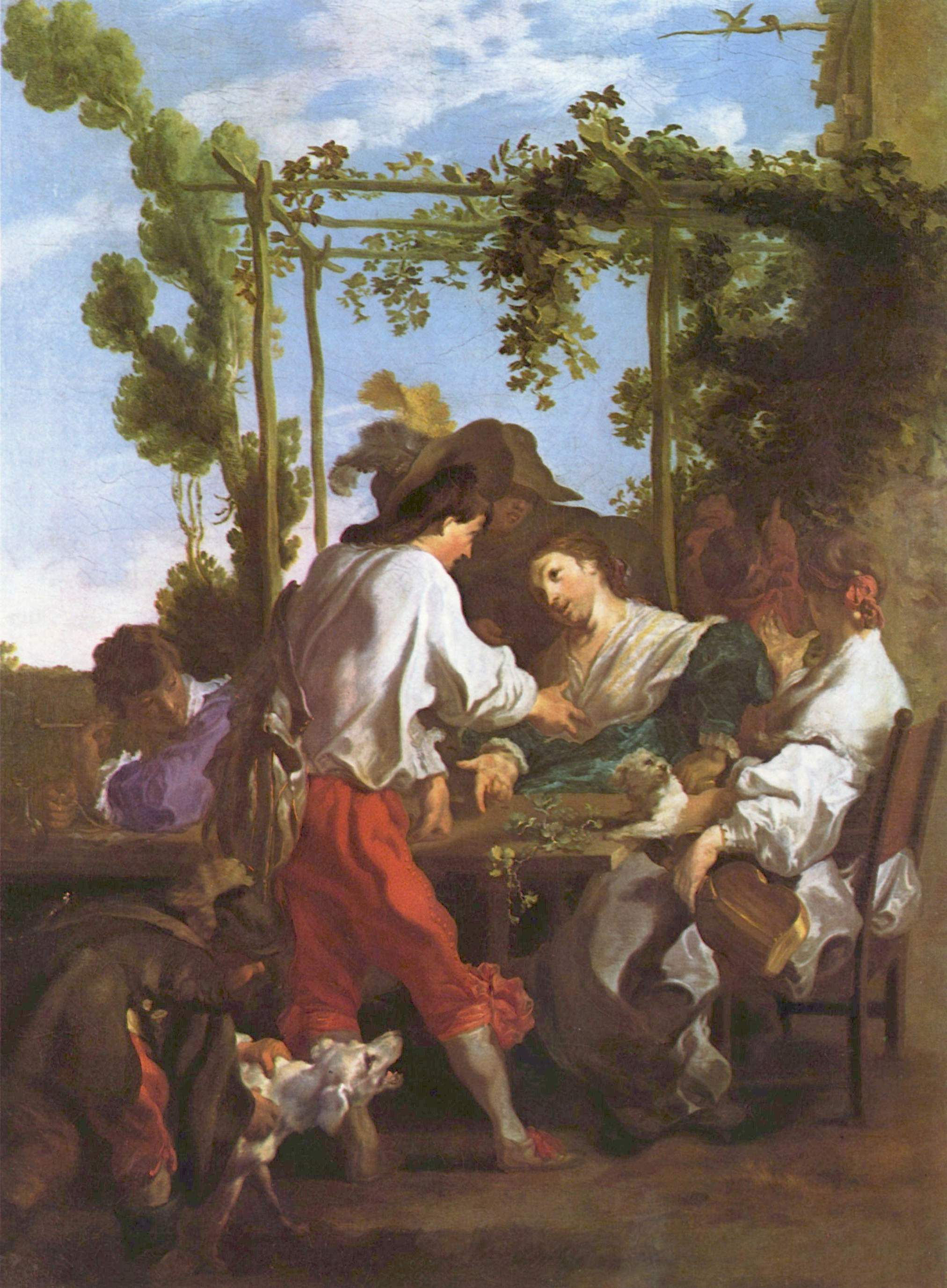
A game of mora, c. 1622

Johann Liss or Jan Lys (c. 1590 or 1597 – 1629 or 1630) was a leading German Baroque painter of the 17th century, active mainly in Venice.

== Biography ==
Liss was born in Oldenburg (Holstein) in Schleswig-Holstein, Germany. After an initial education in his home state, he continued his studies, according to Houbraken, with Hendrick Goltzius in Haarlem and Amsterdam. Around 1620 he travelled through Paris to Venice. He moved to Rome around 1620–1622, and his first works there were influenced by the style of Caravaggio.

Although his earlier work was concerned with the contrasts of light and shadow, his final move to Venice in the early 1620s modified his style and gave impetus to brilliant color and a spirited treatment of the painted surface. In 1627, he painted an admired large altarpiece, the Inspiration of Saint Jerome in San Nicolò da Tolentino. His loose brushstrokes seem precursor to rococo styles of the Guardi brothers. This final style, along with that of other "foreign" painters residing in Venice, Domenico Fetti and Bernardo Strozzi, represent the first inroads of Baroque style into the republic.

Liss fled to Verona to escape the plague spreading in Venice, but succumbed there prematurely in 1629. According to Houbraken, he worked day and night on his paintings, so that Joachim von Sandrart felt that his health was at risk and urged him to join him in Rome.

His legacy is as a painter of both sensuous mythological and pious biblical subjects, a master of colors and Baroque painting. He was most influential to Venetian 18th-century painters like Sebastiano Ricci, Giovanni Battista Tiepolo and Giovanni Piazzetta.

Joachim von Sandrart wrote in 1675 that "because he fared well in Venice, he soon returned there ... he died along with many others during the plague that began in 1629."

== Nazi looting and restitution ==
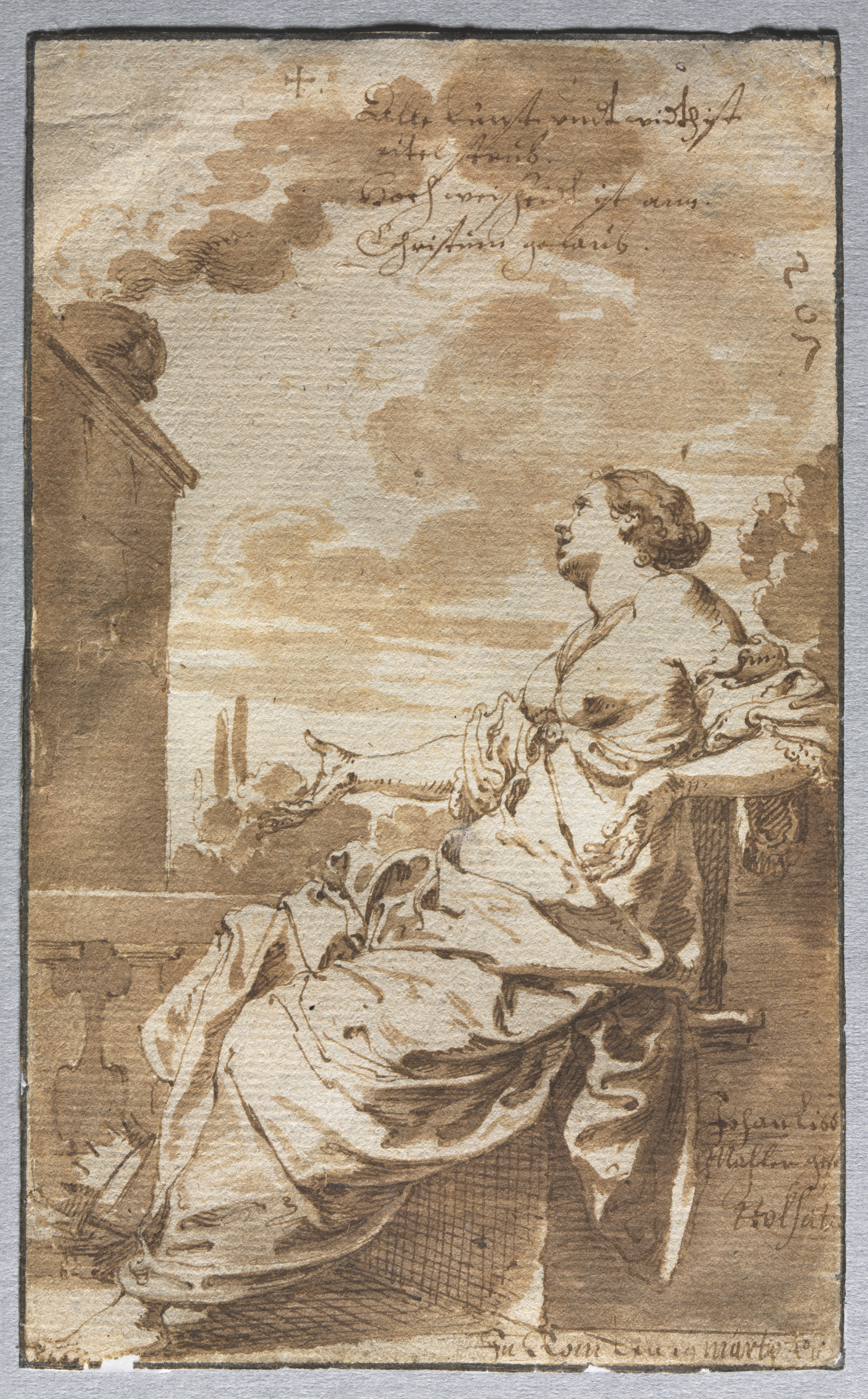
Allegory of Christian Belief

In 1939, the Liss drawing entitled "Allegory of Christian Faith" was one of 750 Old Master drawings seized from the home of Arthur Feldmann and his wife by the Nazis. The Cleveland Museum of Art, which acquired the drawing from the art dealer Herbert Bier in 1953, reached a settlement with the Feldmann heirs in 2013. The Feldmanns, a Jewish couple, were murdered in the Holocaust.

== Examples of work ==
- Lute Player
- Visitation of St Jerome
- Vision of Saint Jerome
- Peasants playing mora
- Judith in the Tent of Holofernes (c.1622, National Gallery, London)
- Death of Cleopatra
- Abel mourned by his parents
- Venus in front of mirror (1625–26, Uffizi)
- Death of Phaeton
- Cupid (Cleveland Art Museum, Cleveland, Ohio)
