= Eduard A. Safarik =

Eduard Alexandr Safarik (Šafařík) (19 May 1928 – 15 August 2015) was an Italian art historian of Czech descent. He focused on Italian art, especially Venetian paintings of the 16th and 17th century, and Jan Kupecký. He authored several monographs and many articles, catalogues and encyclopedic entries.

== Career ==
In the 1950s Safarik was the director of the pinacotheca of Kroměříž Archbishop's Palace, where he discovered several masterpieces, including a painting by Paolo Veronese. In 1957–1968 he worked in the National Gallery in Prague, and after that in Bibliotheca Hertziana and Galleria Nazionale d'Arte Antica in Rome. In 1971 Safarik became the director of the Doria Pamphilj Gallery, and in the 1980s he was the director of the Colonna Art Gallery.
