= Domenico Fetti =

Italian painter (c.1589–1623)

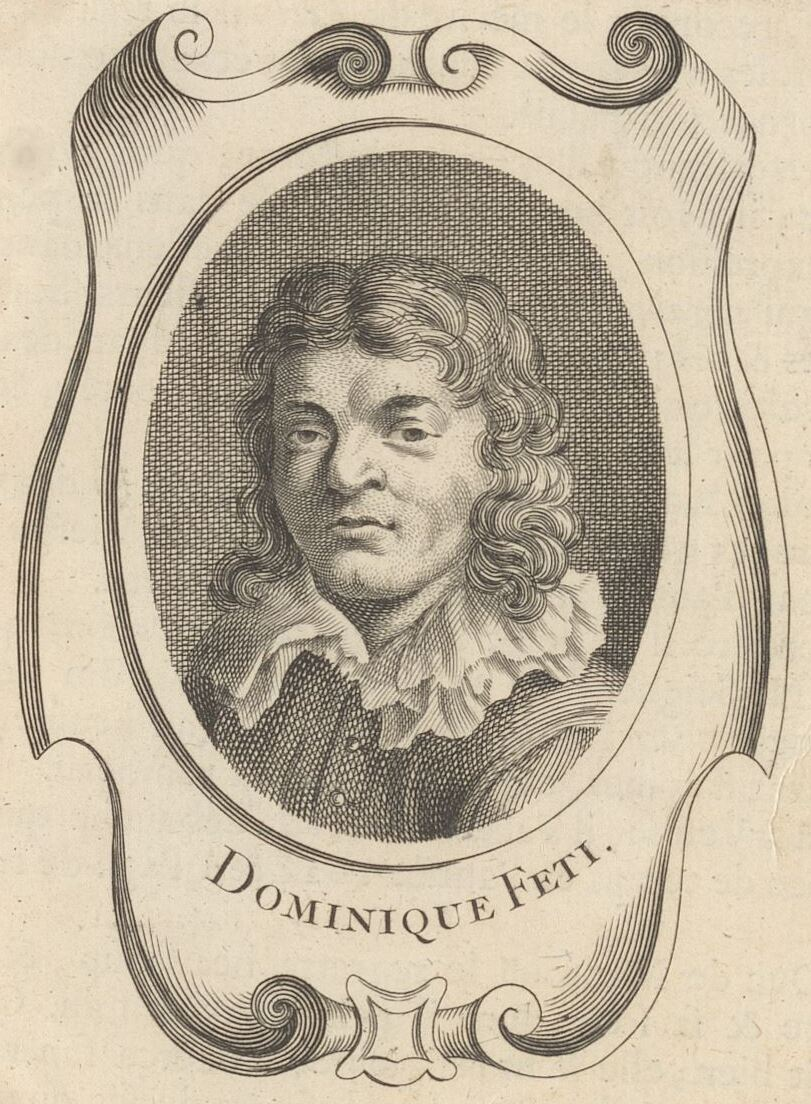
- Born: c. 1589; Rome, Italy
- Died: 16 April 1623 (Aged 33-34); Venice
- Known for: Painting
- Movement: Baroque
- Patrons: Duke Ferdinando I Gonzaga

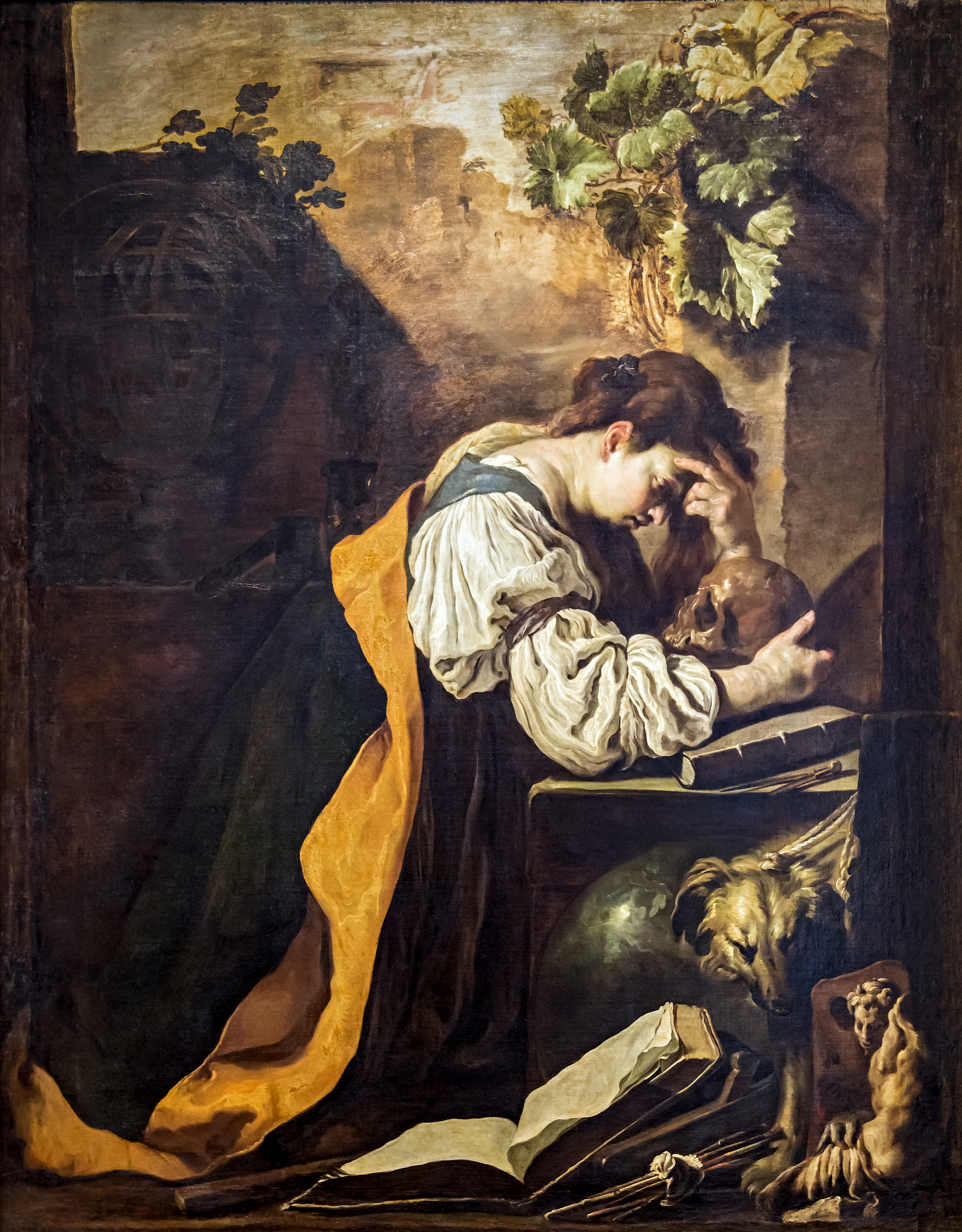
Magdalene in Meditation (Accademia, Venice)

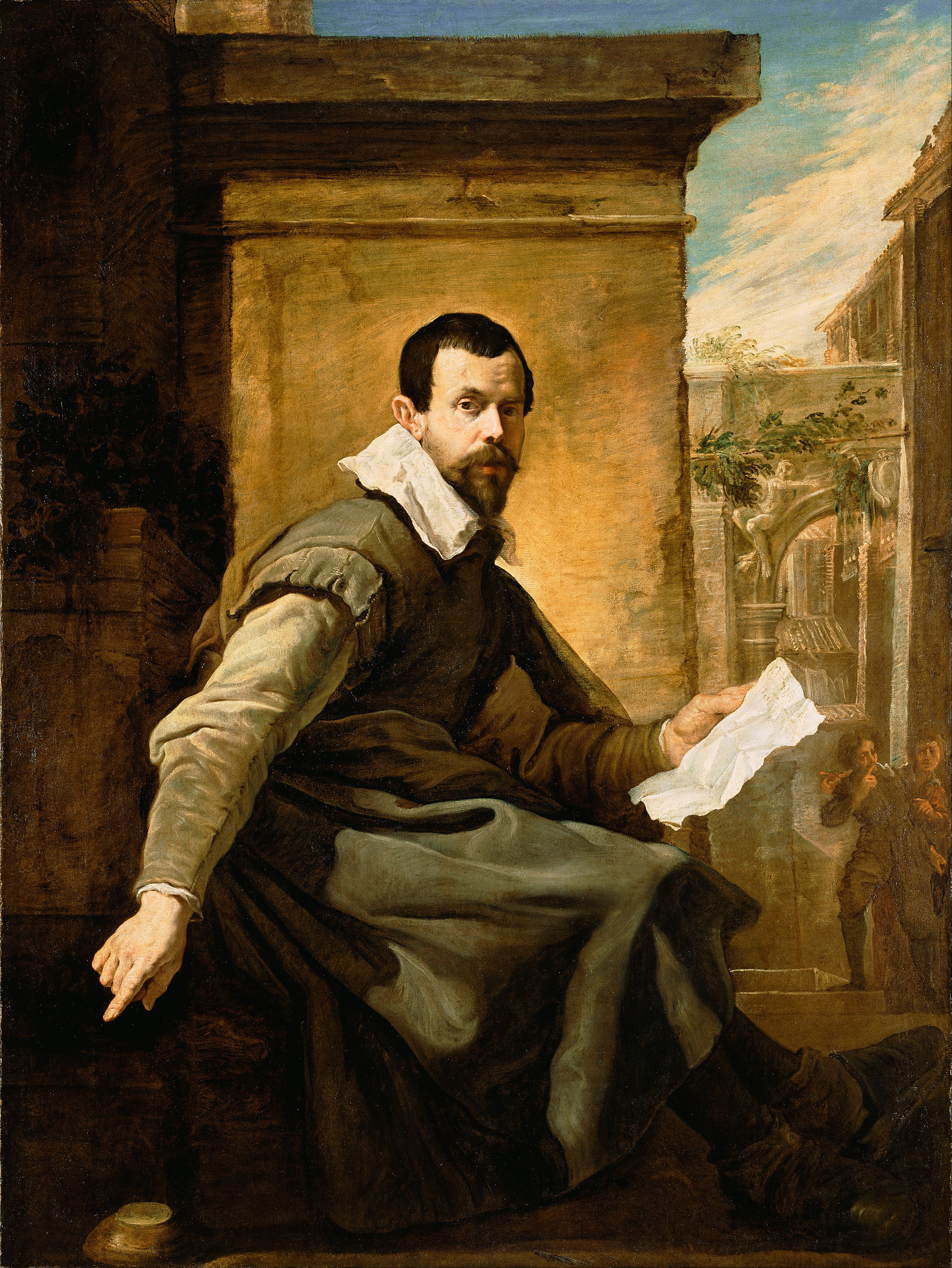
Portrait of a Man with a Sheet of Music (Getty Museum)

Domenico Fetti (also spelled Feti) (c. 1589 – 16 April 1623) was an Italian Baroque painter who was active mainly in Rome, Mantua and Venice.

== Biography ==
Born in Rome to a little-known painter, Pietro Fetti, Domenico is said to have apprenticed initially under Ludovico Cigoli, or his pupil Andrea Commodi in Rome from circa 1604–1613. He then worked in Mantua from 1613 to 1622, patronized by the Cardinal, later Duke Ferdinando I Gonzaga. In the Ducal Palace, he painted the Miracle of the Loaves and Fishes. The series of representations of New Testament parables he carried out for his patron's studiolo gave rise to a popular speciality, and he and his studio often repeated his compositions.

In August or September 1622, his feuds with some prominent Mantuans led him to move to Venice, which for the first few decades of the seventeenth century had persisted in sponsoring Mannerist styles (epitomized by Palma the Younger and the successors of Tintoretto and Veronese). Into this mix, in the 1620s–30s, three "foreigners"—Fetti and his younger contemporaries Bernardo Strozzi and Jan Lys—breathed the first influences of the Roman Baroque style. They adapted some of the rich colouration of Venice but adapted it to Caravaggio-influenced realism and monumentality.

In Venice, where he remained despite pleas from the Duke to return to Mantua, Fetti changed his style: his formalized painting style became more colourful. In addition, he devoted attention to smaller cabinet pieces that adapt genre imaging to religious stories. His group of paintings entitled Parables, which represent New Testament scenes, are at the Dresden Gemäldegalerie. He influenced Leonaert Bramer.

His painting style appears to have been influenced by Rubens. He would likely have continued to find excellent patronage in Venice had he not died there in 1623 or 1624. Jan Lys, eight years younger, but who had arrived in Venice nearly contemporaneously, died during the plague of 1629–30. Subsequently, Fetti's style would influence the Venetians Pietro della Vecchia and Sebastiano Mazzone. His pupils in Mantua were Francesco Bernardi (il Bigolaro) and Dionisio Guerri. He also instructed his sister Lucrina in painting, and her works have sometimes been attributed to him.

== Gallery ==
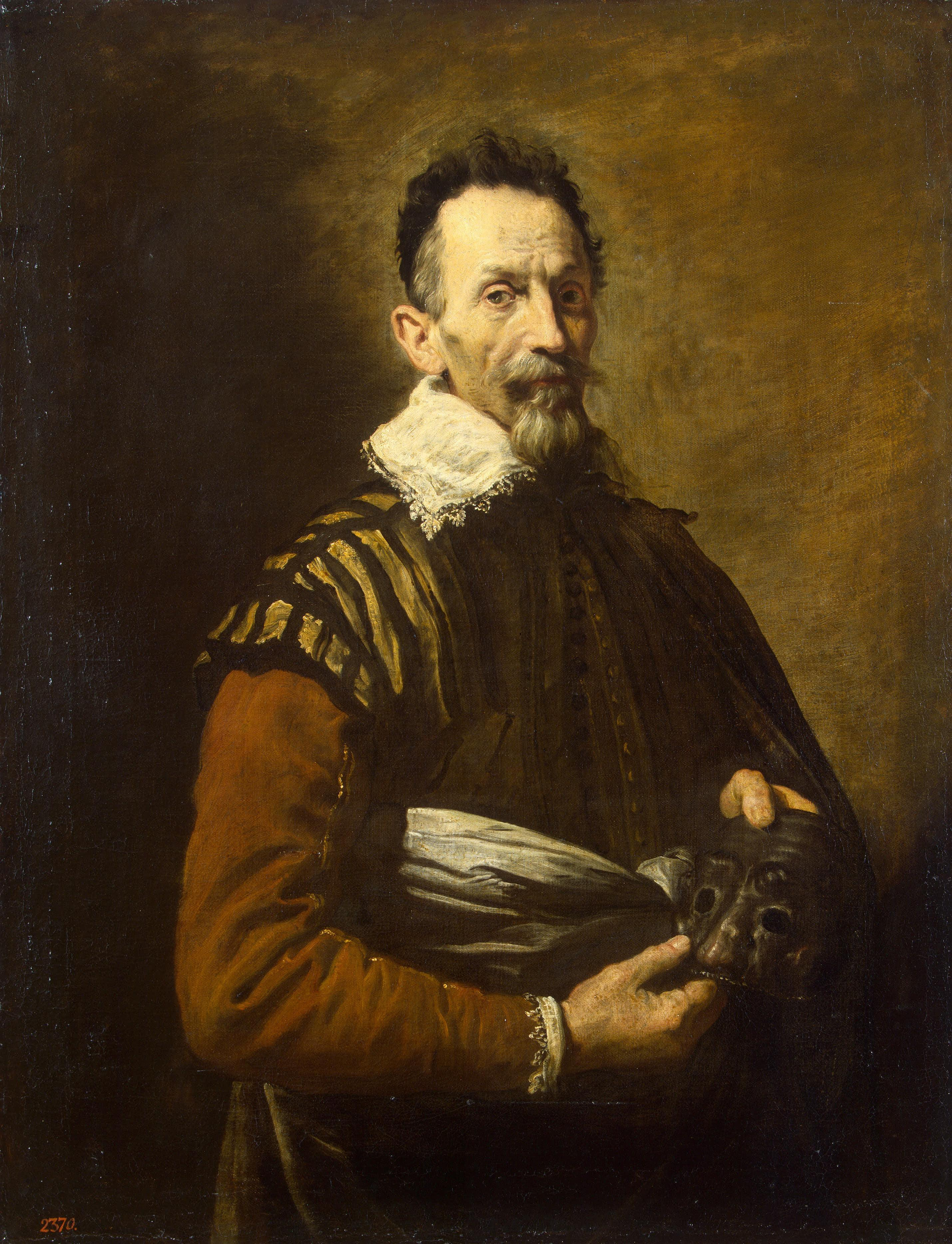
Portrait of an Actor (c. 1621–1622)

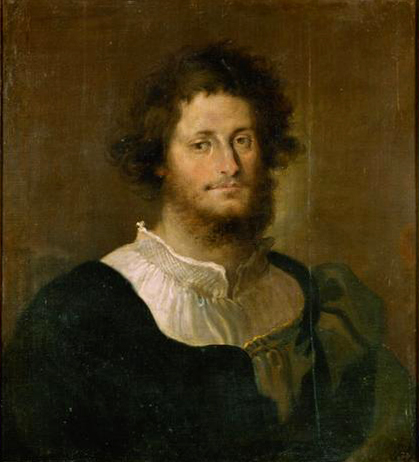
Ideal Portrait of Gonzaga (c. 1620)

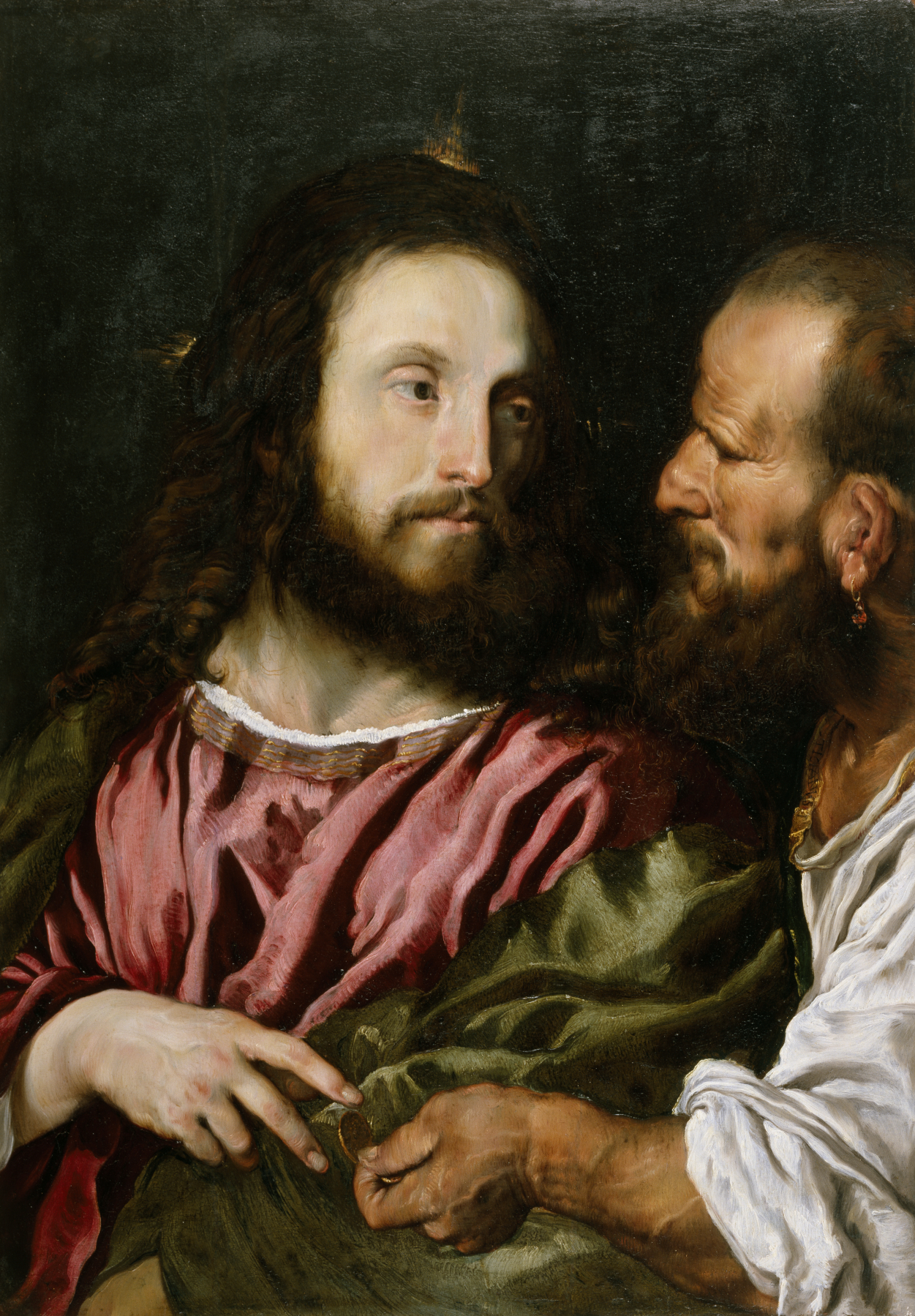
Christ and the Tribute Money (c. 1618–1620), a copy of The Tribute Money by Titian

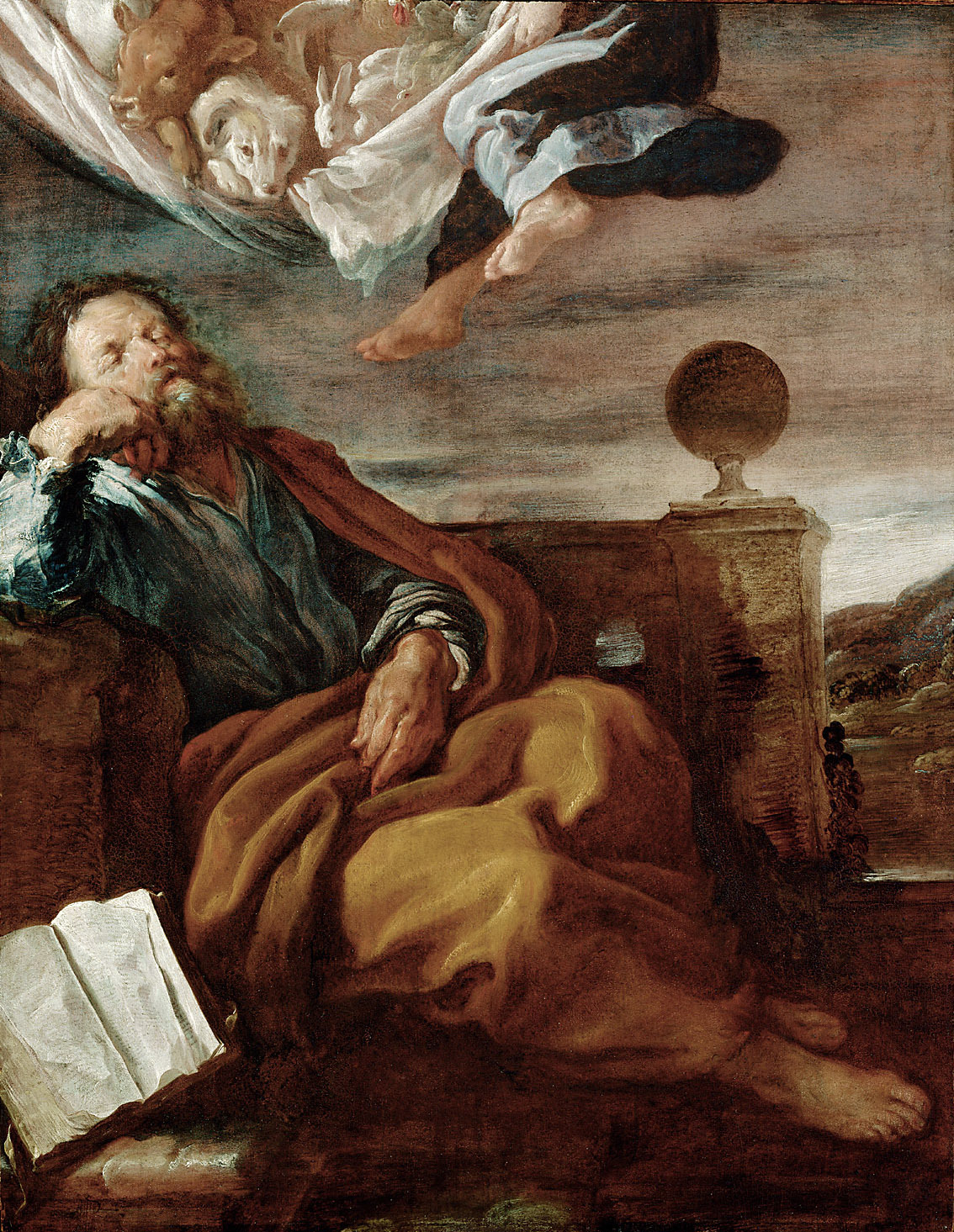
Peter's vision of a sheet with animals (c. 1619)

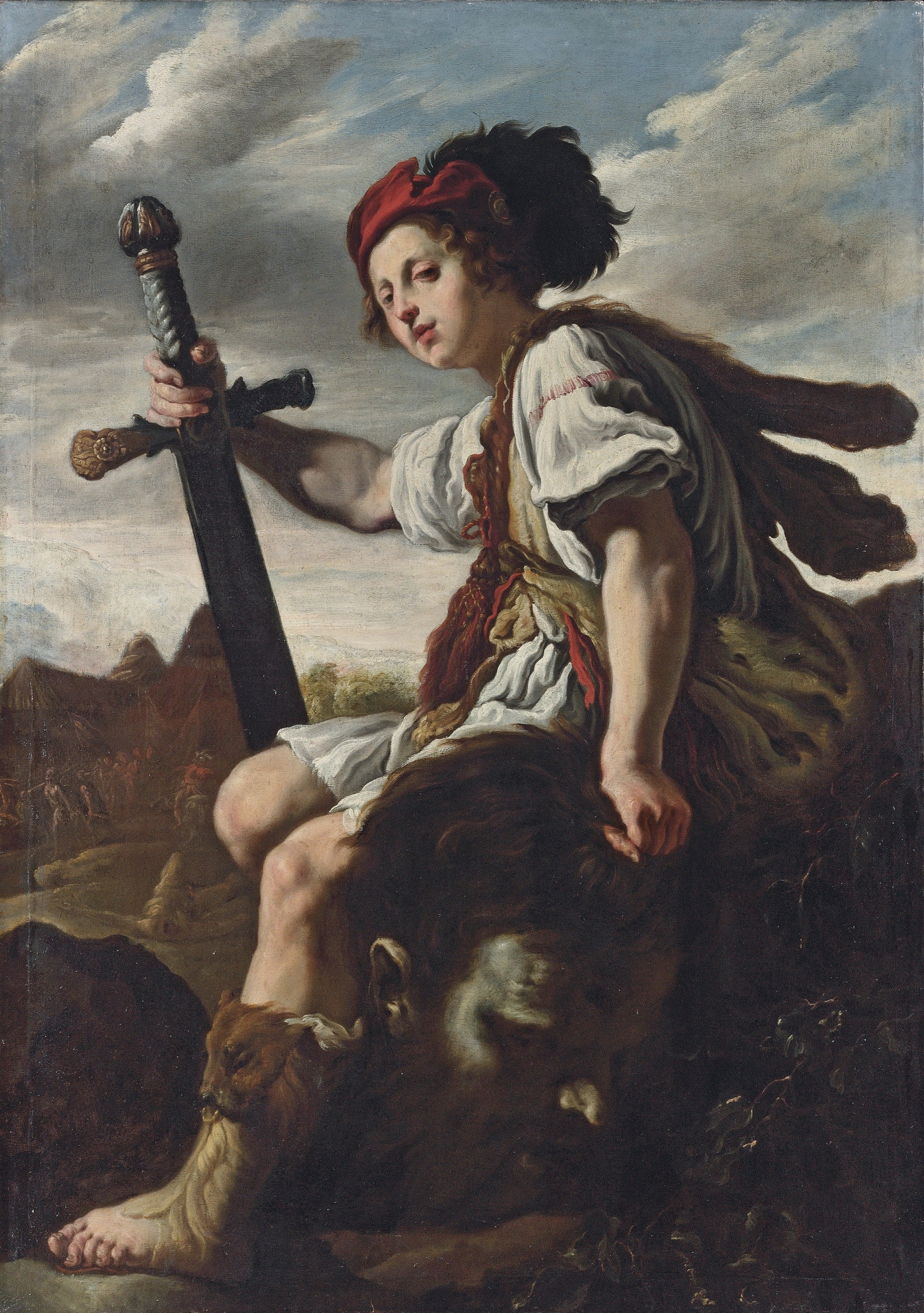
David with the Head of Goliath (c. 1610–1620)

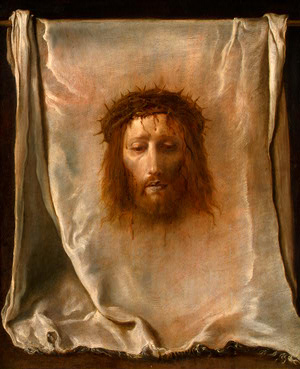
Veronica's Veil (1618 or 1622)

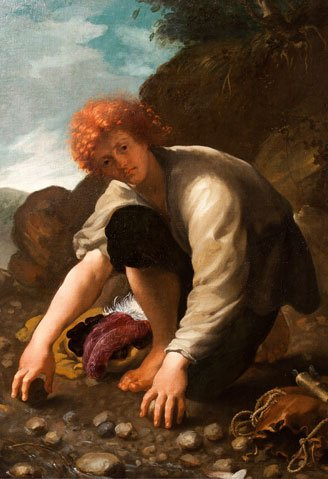
The Young David Gathering Stones for his Slingshot

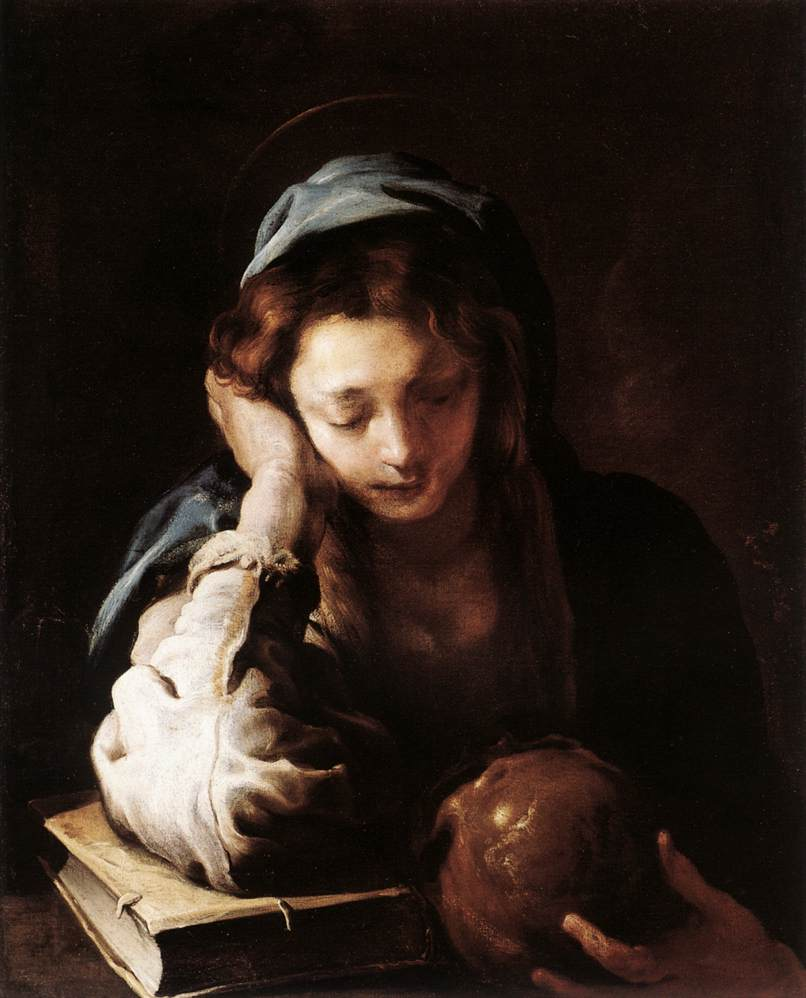
The Repentant St Mary Magdalene (c. 1617–1621)

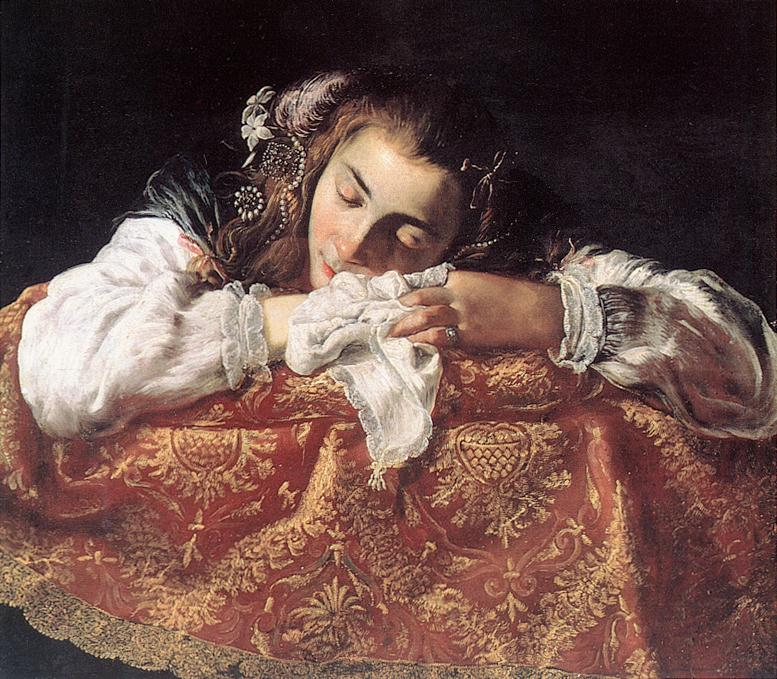
Sleeping Girl (c. 1615)

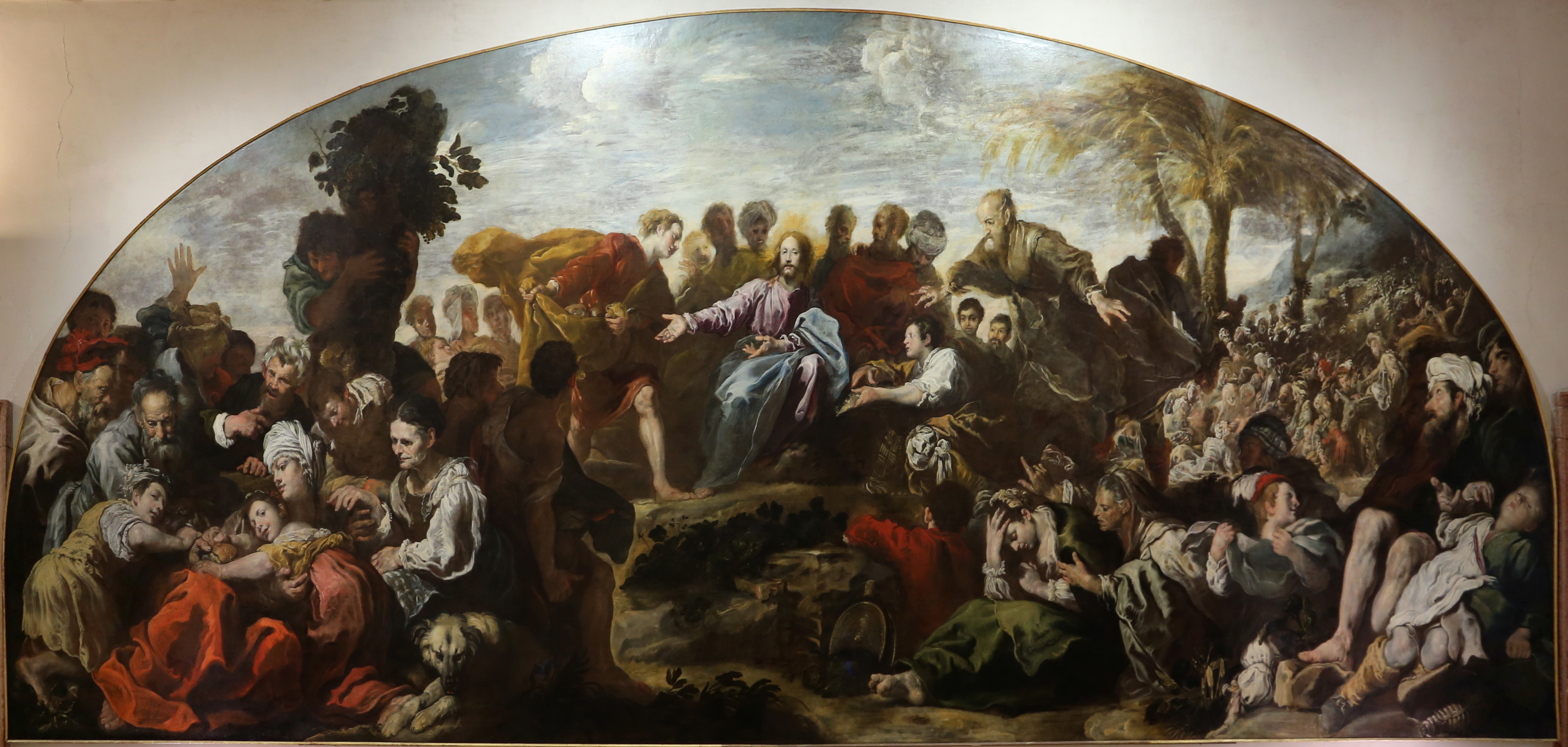
Multiplication of the Loaves and Fishes (c. 1620)

== Works ==
Fetti's works include:

- The Good Samaritan (Metropolitan Museum of Art, New York)
- Melancholy (Accademia, Venice)
- Emperor Domitian (Louvre)
- Eve and Laboring Adam (Louvre)
- Angel in the Garden (Louvre)
- Jacob's Dream (Kunsthistorisches Museum, Vienna)
- Portrait of an Actor (Hermitage Museum, St Petersburg)
- The Healing of Tobit (Hermitage Museum, St Petersburg)
