= Muselli =

Muselli is an Italian surname. Notable people with the surname include:

- Giacomo Muselli (1569–1641), Italian merchant, owner of the Muselli collection
- Vincent Muselli (1879–1956), French writer and poet

== See also ==
- Musella
