= Muselli collection =

Art collection in Italy

The Muselli collection was one of the most notable art collections in 18th-century Italy and—with the Gusti and Curtoni collections—a highlight of modern collecting in Verona.

== History ==
Giacomo Muselli (1569–1641) came from a family of merchants and enjoyed an exceptionally secure economic status. He lived in the Bra district of Verona and appeared in the 1614 census aged 45. In the 1616 assessment, he was rated in the top tax bracket. It is unclear when he began collecting, but in only a few decades he gathered around 150 high-quality small- and medium-sized works. He remained attached to his collection, refusing to sell it to Francesco I d'Este and adding a provision in his will banning his children from lending works or having copies made of them.

The collection included several works by Renaissance artists from Venice or of Venetian descent such as Veronese, Titian, Giovanni Bellini and Moretto da Brescia, along with works by 16th century German, Flemish, and Dutch artists such as Civetta and Lucas Cranach the Elder) and the 17th century Veronese school. Alessandro Turchi works on canvas, and touchstone was particularly strongly represented. It also included a small but important collection of drawings and prints, along with a bas-relief of The Judgement of Solomon by Giammaria Mosca (Louvre). The drawings included Man with a Pregnant Bitch by Parmigianino (a possible self-portrait) and Fall of Phaeton by Michelangelo (British Museum), acquired in Verona from the French banker and collector Pierre Crozat and on his death, passing to the major drawings expert Pierre-Jean Mariette.

The collection as a whole became an unmissable attraction for noblemen and artists who mentioned it in travel diaries and other works such as Maraviglie dell'arte (1648) by Carlo Ridolfi and Microcosmo della pittura (1657) by Francesco Scannelli. Giacomo Sr.'s two sons, Cristoforo and Giovan Francesco, kept the collection together in Verona in the face of much interest from potential Italian and foreign buyers such as Alfonso IV d'Este and his uncle Cesare d'Este (Francesco I's younger brother), perhaps more for its growing economic value than for family reasons or artistic appreciation.

Of Cristoforo's three sons, Girolamo, Giacomo, and Paolo, it would be Giacomo and Paolo who finally sold the collection in 1685–1687 to Jean-Baptiste Colbert, Marquess of Seignelay (1651–1690), eldest son of Louis XIV's controller of finances Jean-Baptiste Colbert, with the French merchant Louis Alvarez and the painter Jean-Baptiste Forest acting as middlemen. On arrival in Paris the collection was split up into small lots and resold to Parisian collections such as that of Pierre Crozat, before soon moving onto Russian, German, Dutch, and British collections. 17th-century Paris was an important market for the European art market in general and the dispersal of Veronese collections in particular.

== Selected works with current locations ==
- Titian, Noli me tangere, National Gallery, London
- Studio of Giovanni Bellini, Circumcision of Christ, National Gallery, London
- Giovanni Bellini, Madonna and Child with Saints Peter and Mark (?) and a donor, Birmingham Museums and Art Gallery
- Moretto da Brescia, Allegory of Faith, Hermitage Museum, Saint Petersburg
- Domenico Capriolo, Man in a Fur, Hermitage Museum, Saint Petersburg
- Domenico Fetti:
  - Assumption, Hermitage Museum, Saint Petersburg
  - The Healing of Tobit, Hermitage Museum, Saint Petersburg
- Paris Bordone:
  - Holy Family with Saint Catherine, Hermitage Museum, Saint Petersburg
  - Portrait of Gian Giacomo Caraglio, Wawel Castle, Krakov
- Alessandro Turchi:
  - Andromeda, Alte Meister, Kassel
  - Leda with Cupids, Alte Meister, Kassel
  - Madonna and Child with the Infant Saint John the Baptist, University of Kentucky Art Museum, Lexington
- Hans Rottenhammer and Jan Brueghel the Elder, Rest on the Flight into Egypt, Alte Pinakothek, Munich
- Hans Rottenhammer, The Wedding Feast at Cana, Alte Pinakothek, Munich
- Paolo Veronese, Portrait of a Man, Hermitage Museum, Saint Petersburg
- Paolo Veronese
  - Holy Family with the Infant Saint John the Baptist, Rijksmuseum, Amsterdam
  - Baptism of Christ, The J. Paul Getty Museum, Los Angeles
  - Rest on the Flight into Egypt, private collection
  - Supper at Emmaus, Museum Boijmans Van Beuningen, Rotterdam
  - Venus at a Mirror, Joslyn Art Museum, Omaha
  - Rebecca at the Well, Burghley House, Stamford
- Michelangelo Anselmi, Christ and the Samaritan Woman, Burghley House, Stamford

== Gallery ==
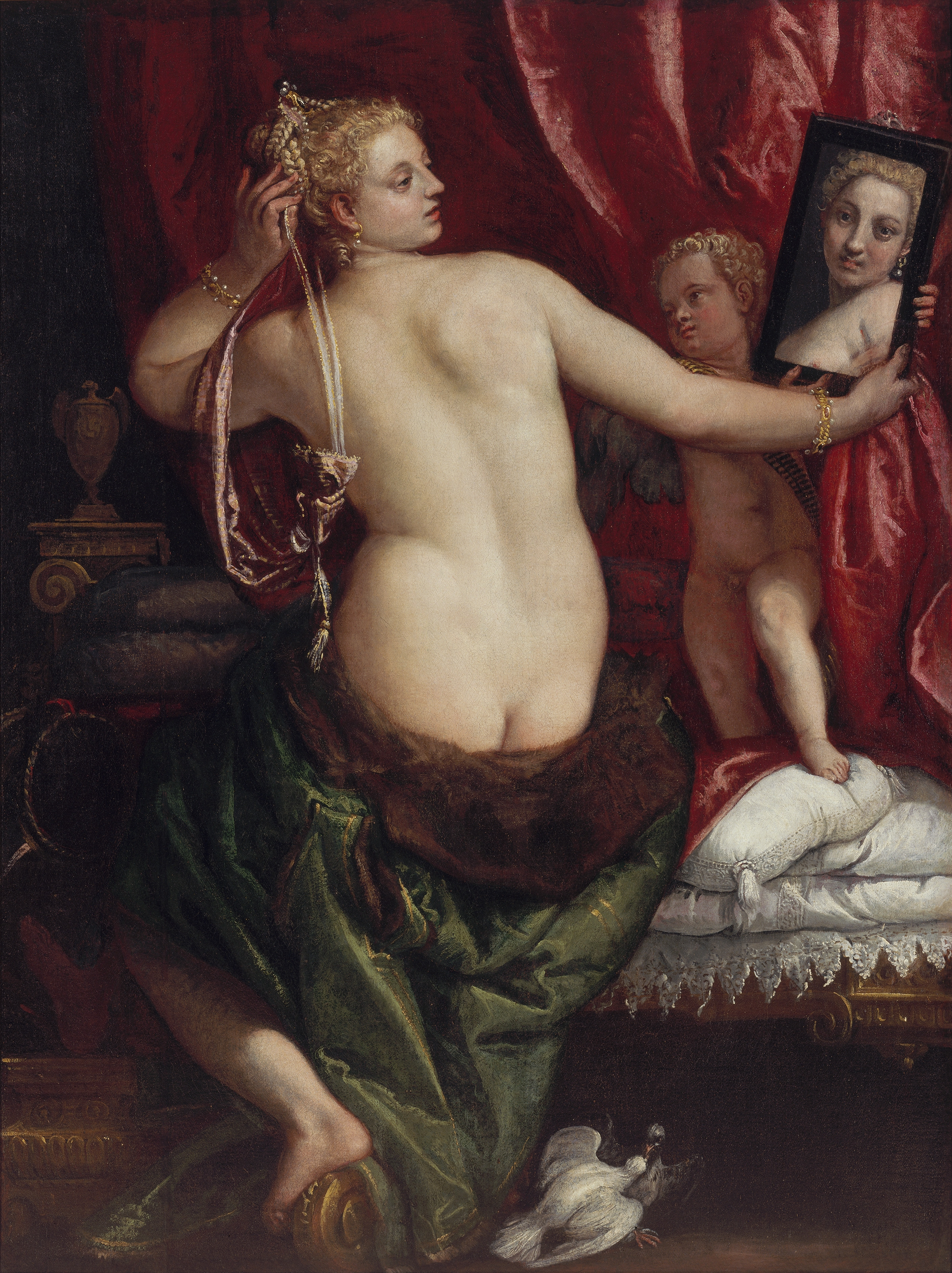
Paolo Veronese. Venus at a Mirror

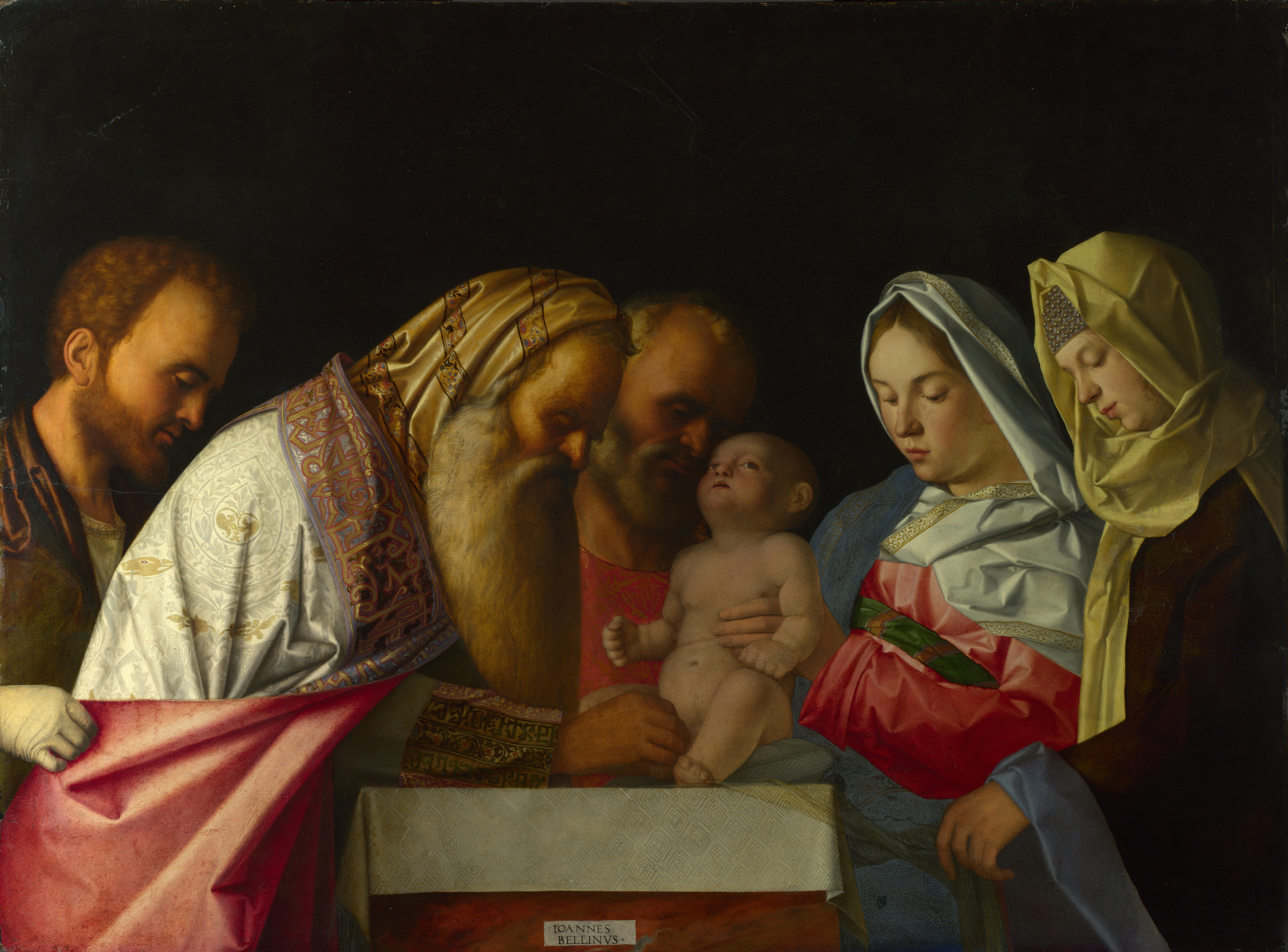
Giovanni Bellini (and studio). Circumcision of Christ

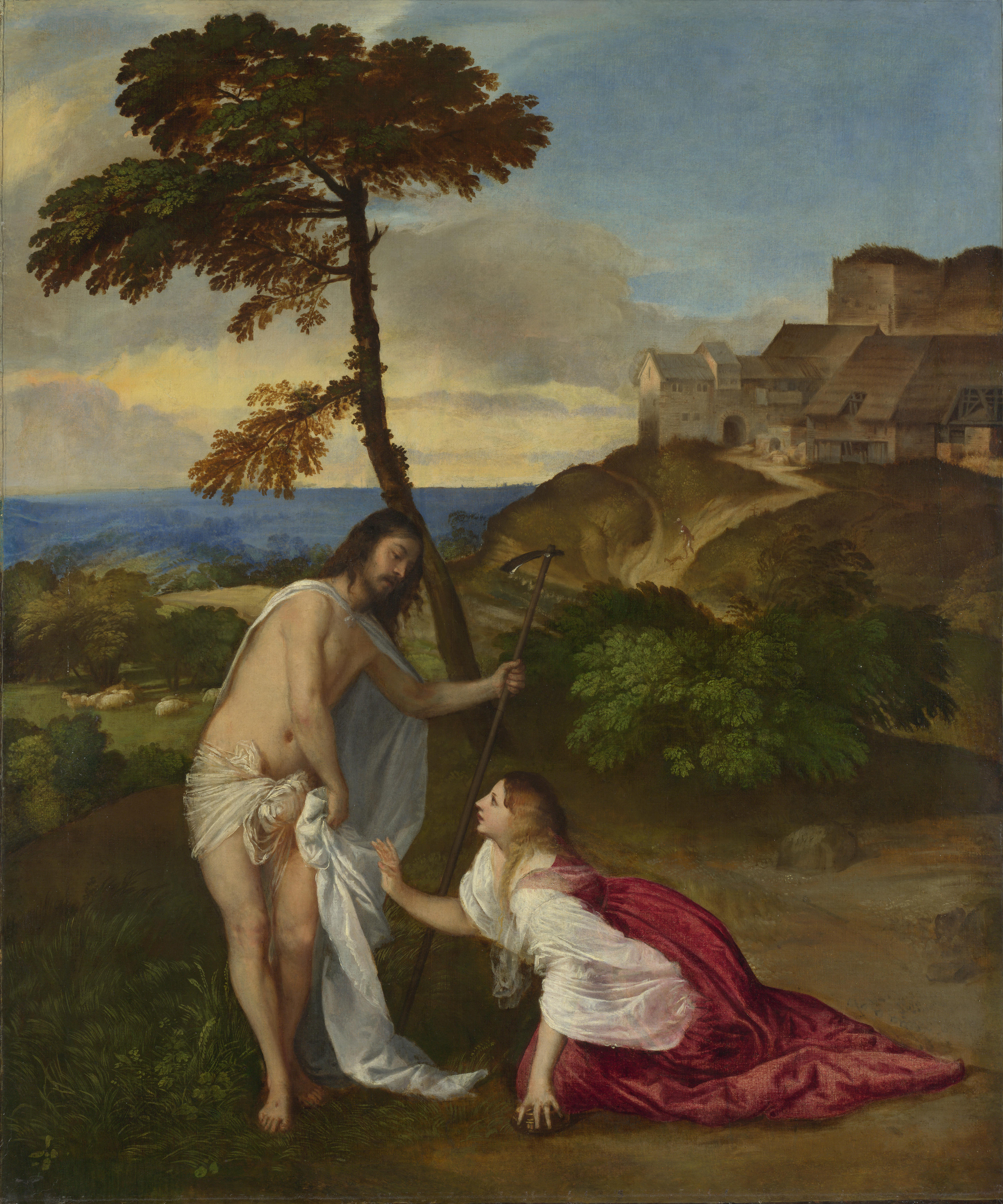
Titian. Noli me tangere

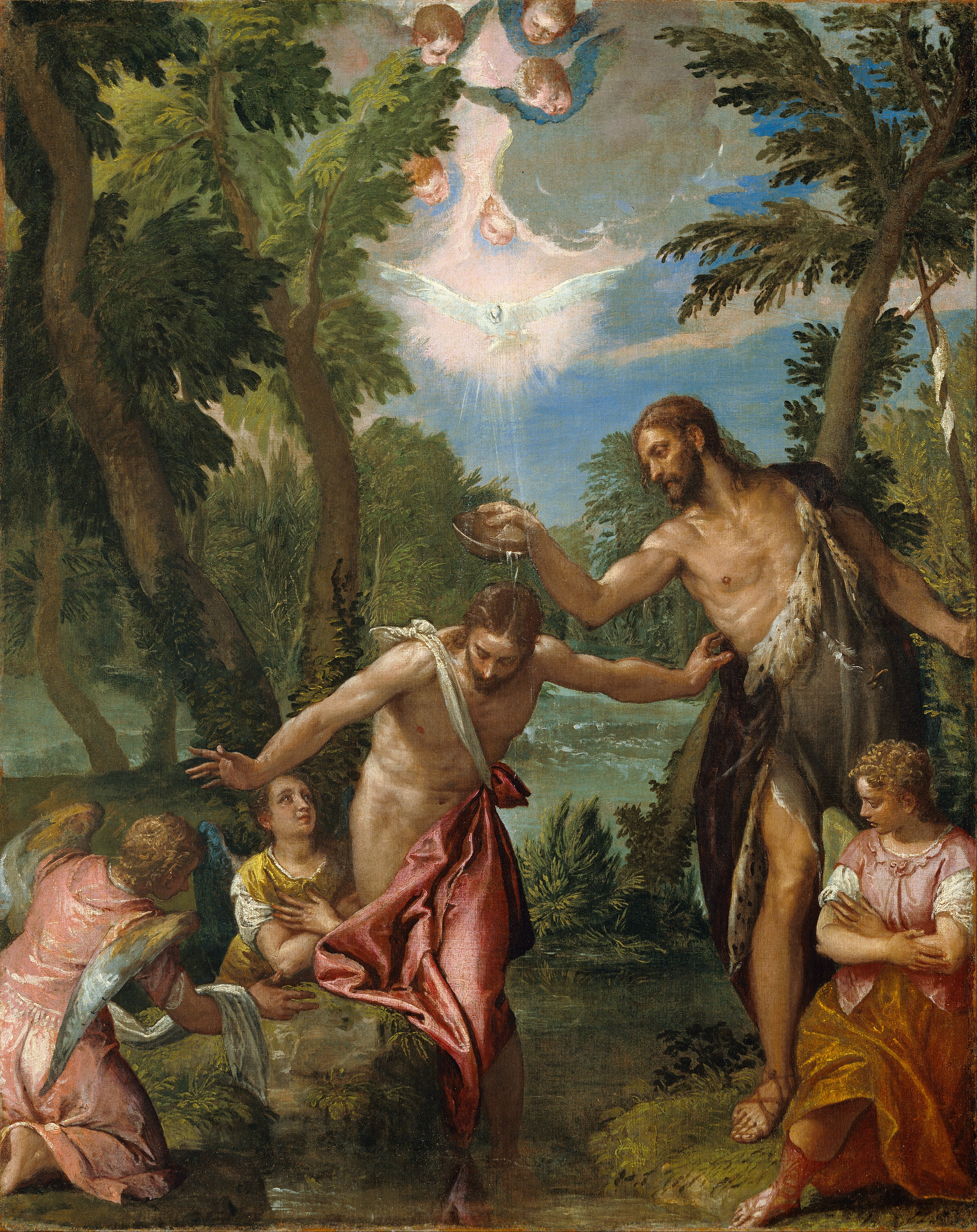
Paolo Veronese. Baptism of Christ

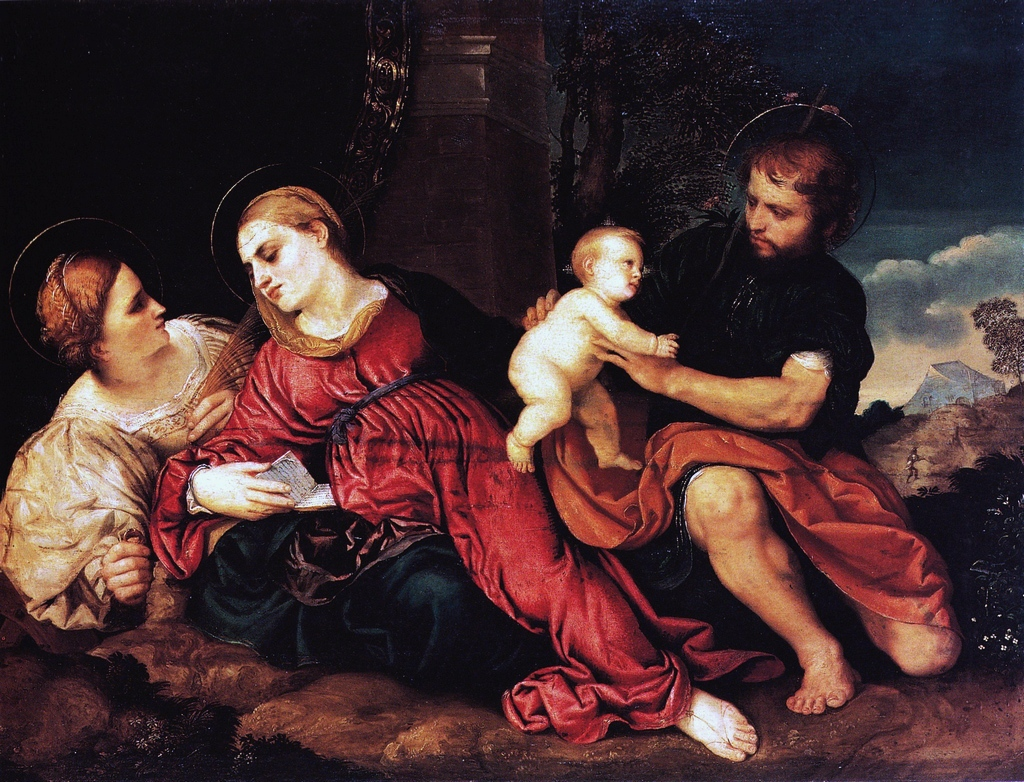
Paris Bordone. Holy Family with Saint Catherine

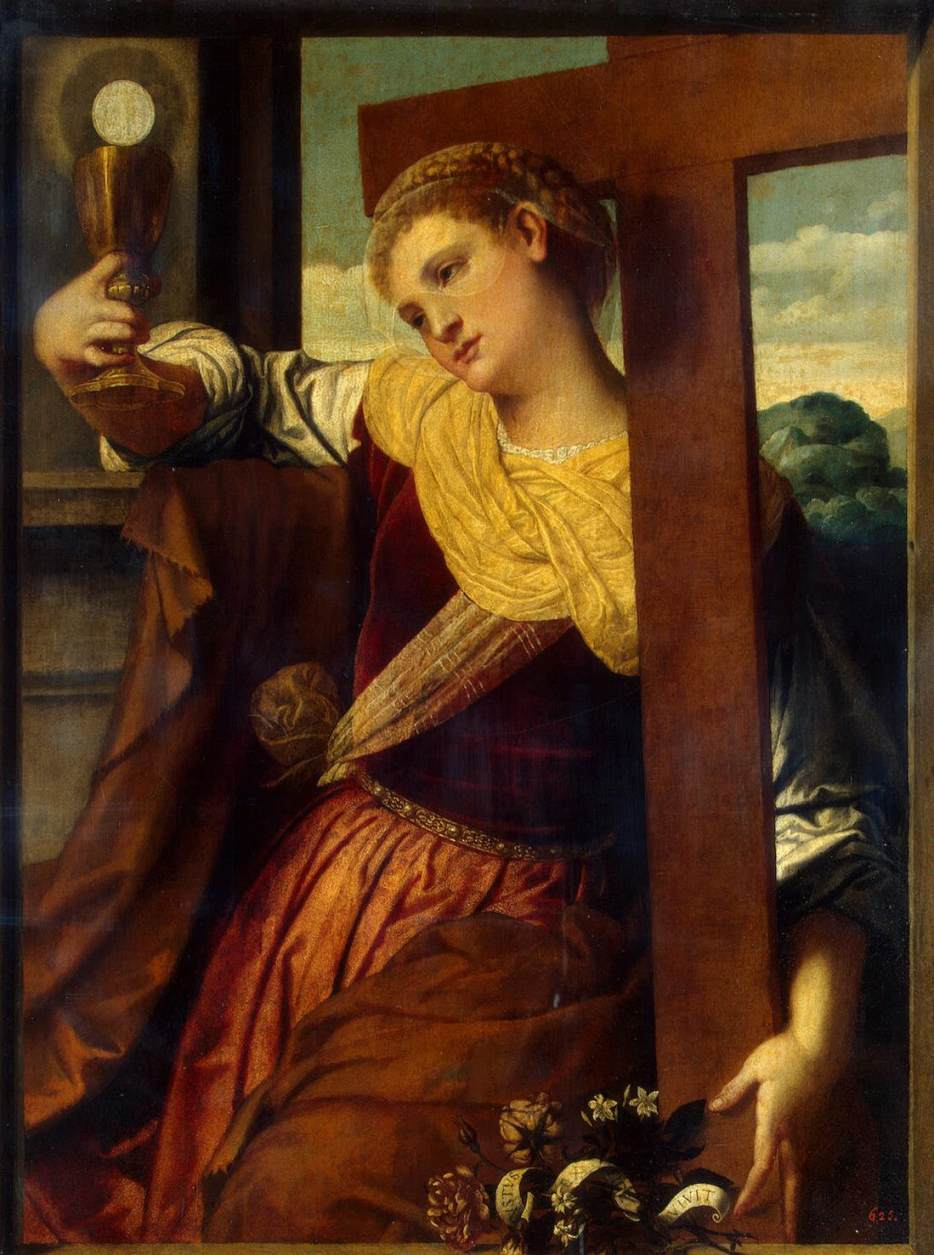
Moretto da Brescia. Allegory of Faith

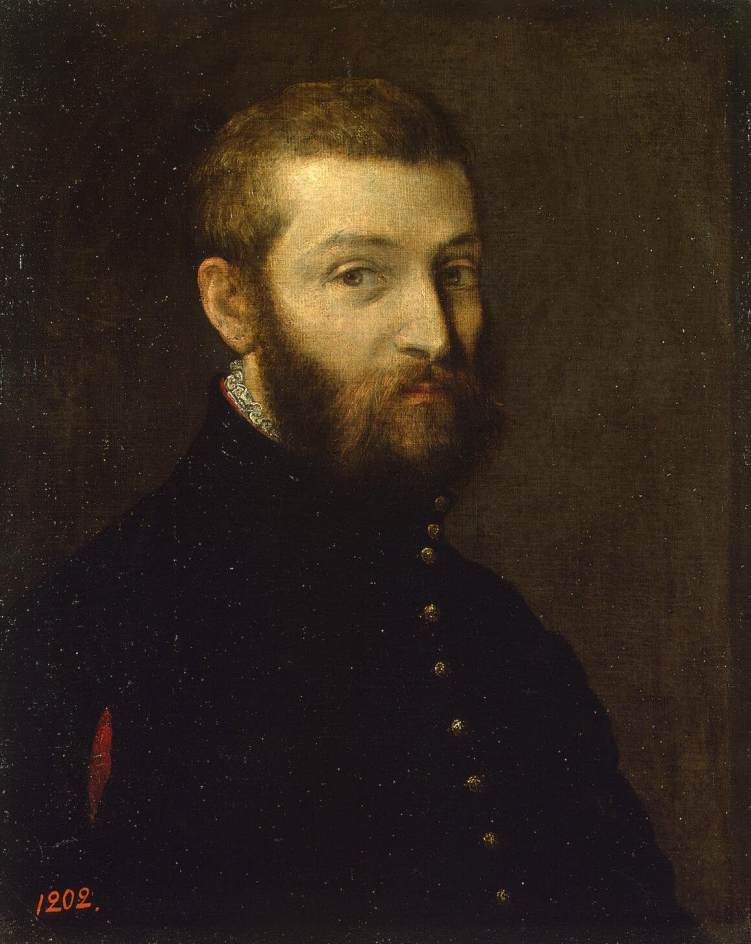
Paolo Veronese. Self-Portrait

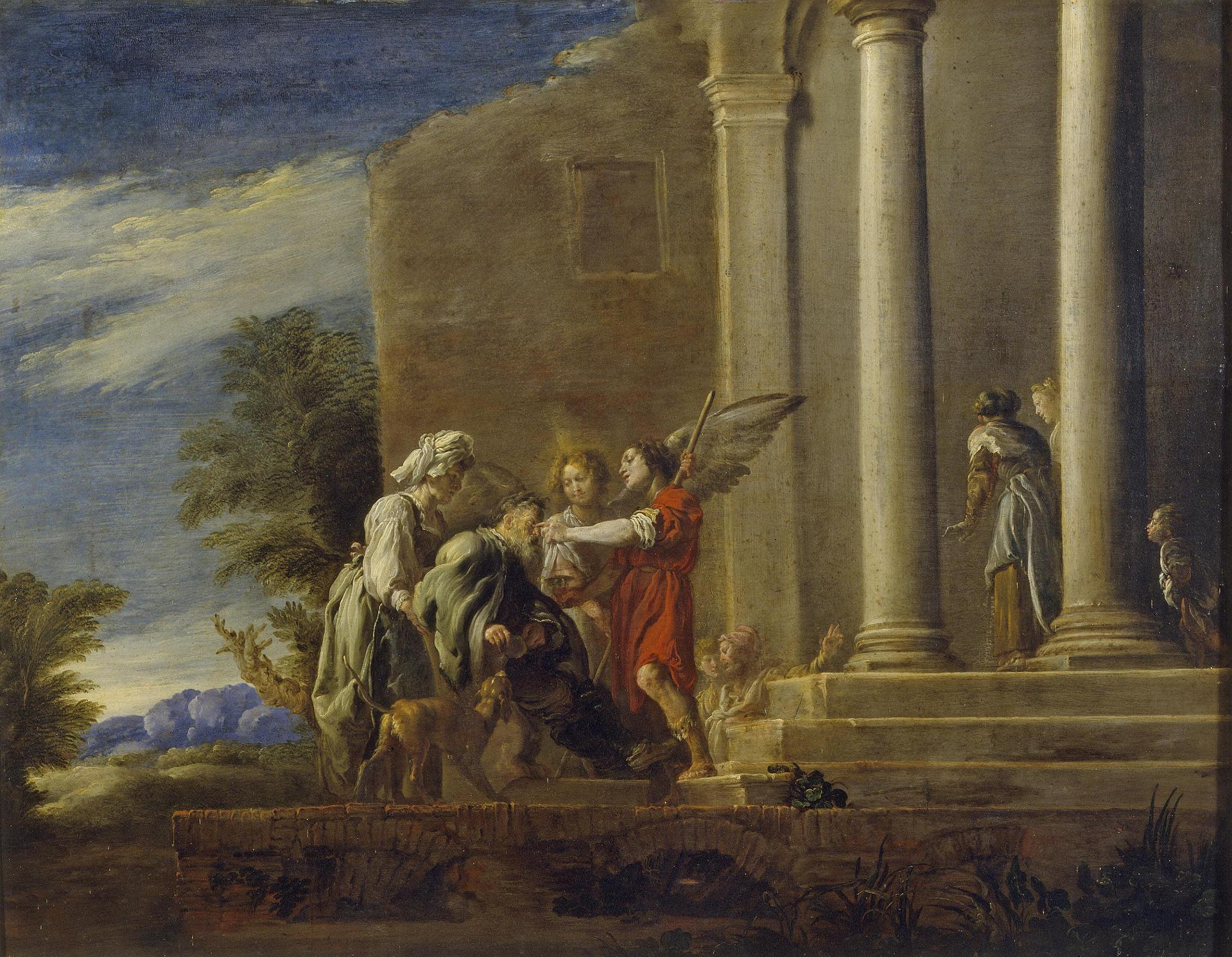
Domenico Fetti. The Healing of Tobit

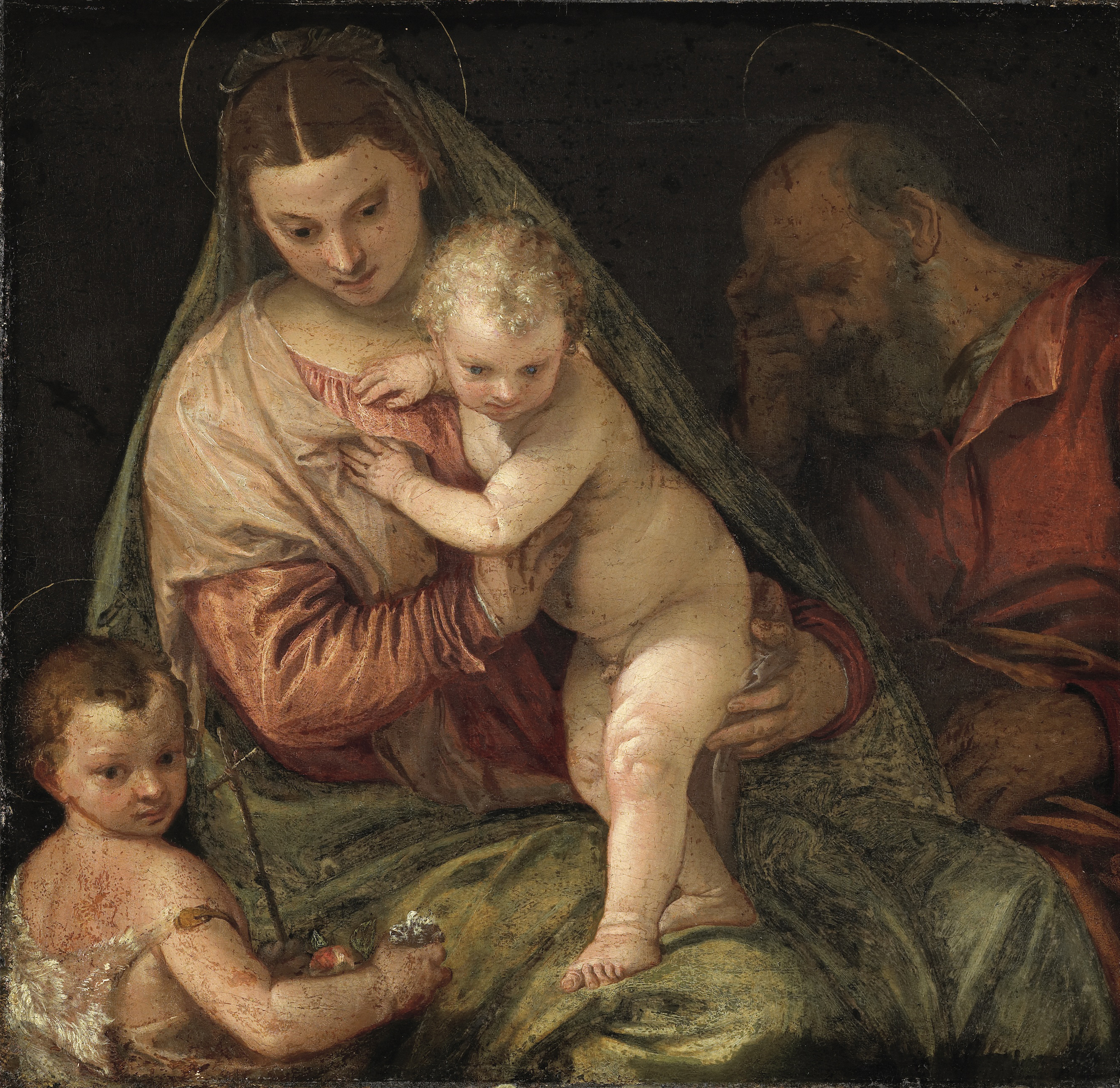
Paolo Veronese. Holy Family with Infant Saint John the Baptist

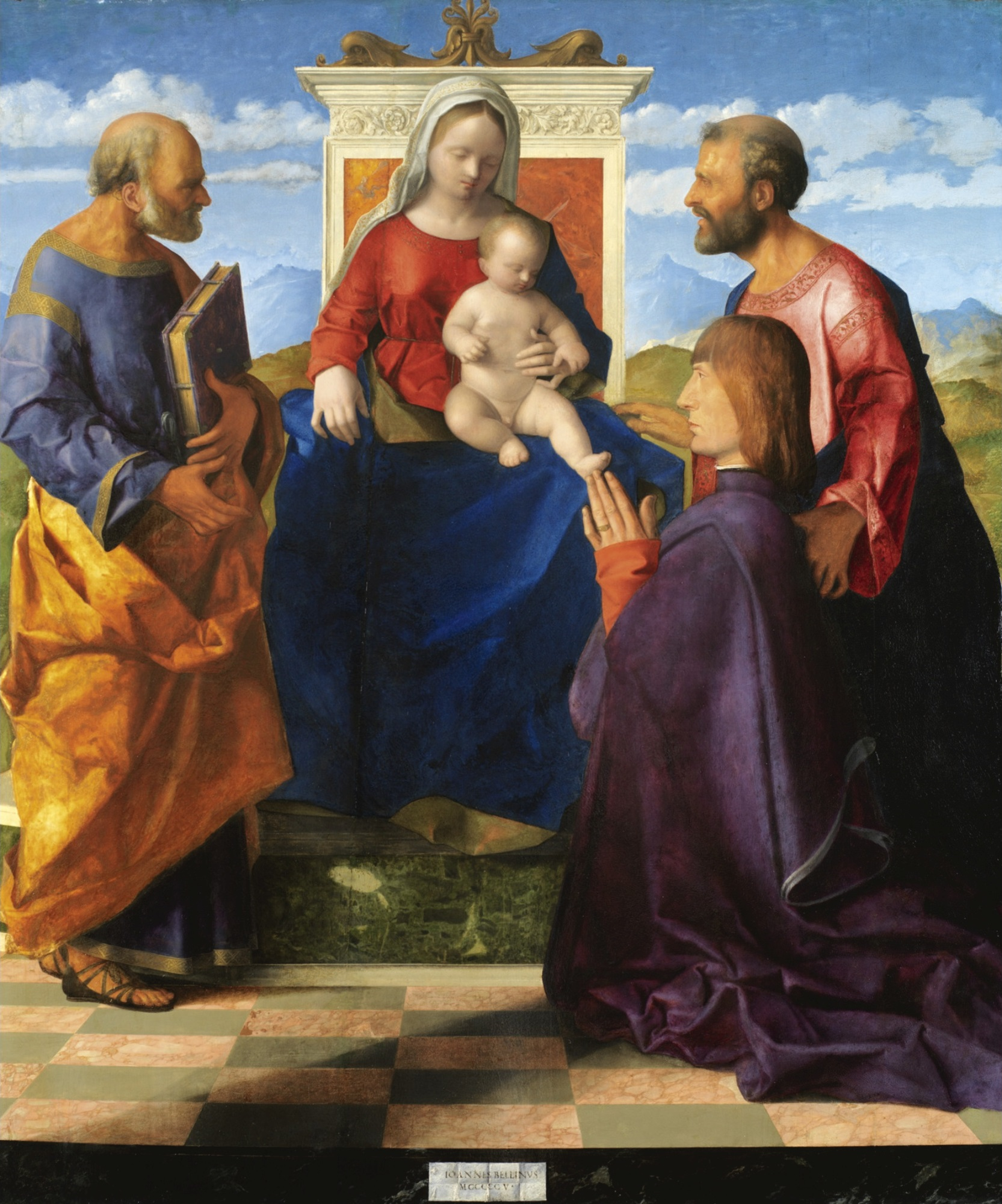
Giovanni Bellini. Madonna and Child with Saints Peter and Mark (?) and a Donor

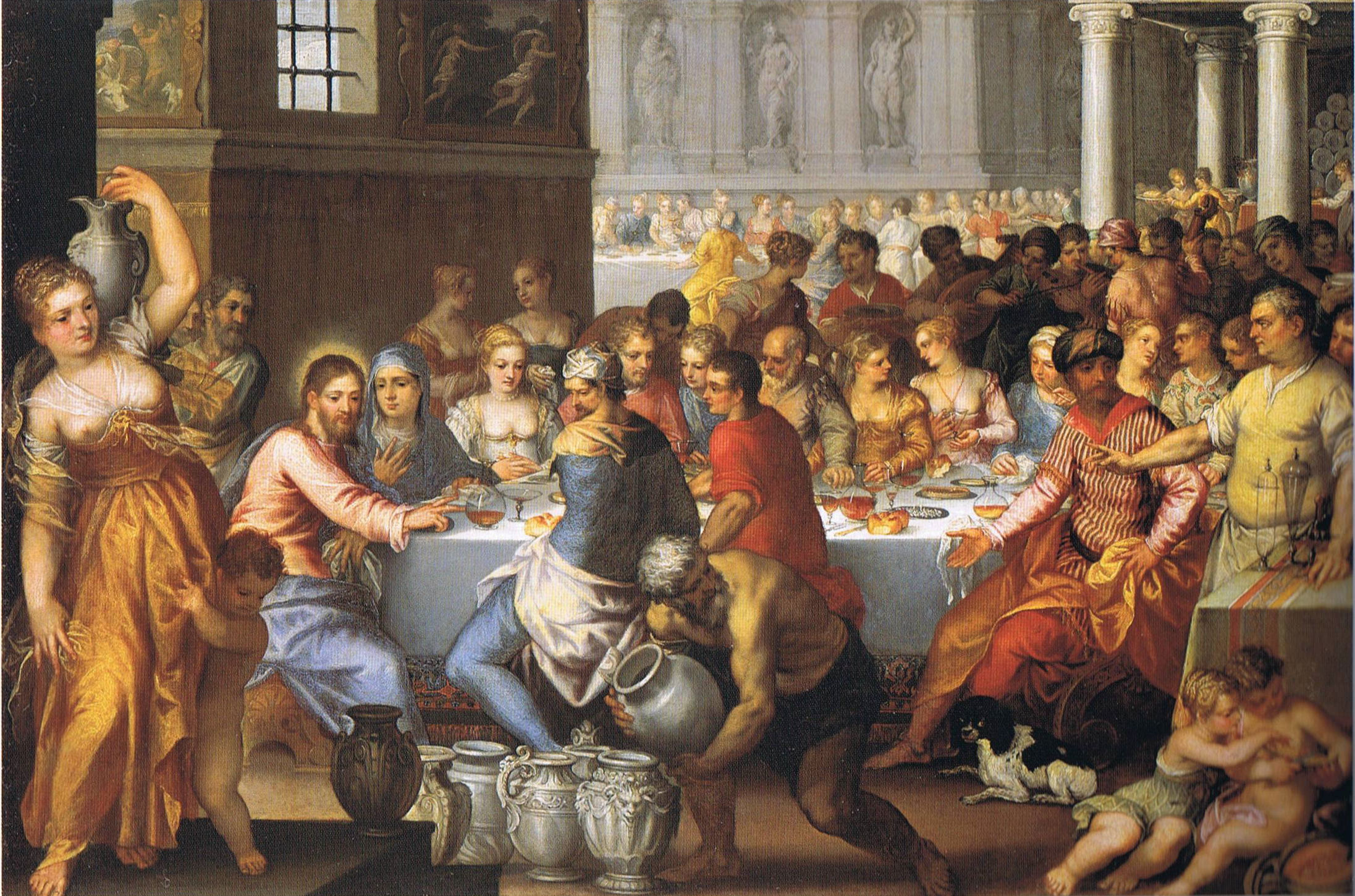
Hans Rottenhammer. Wedding Feast at Cana

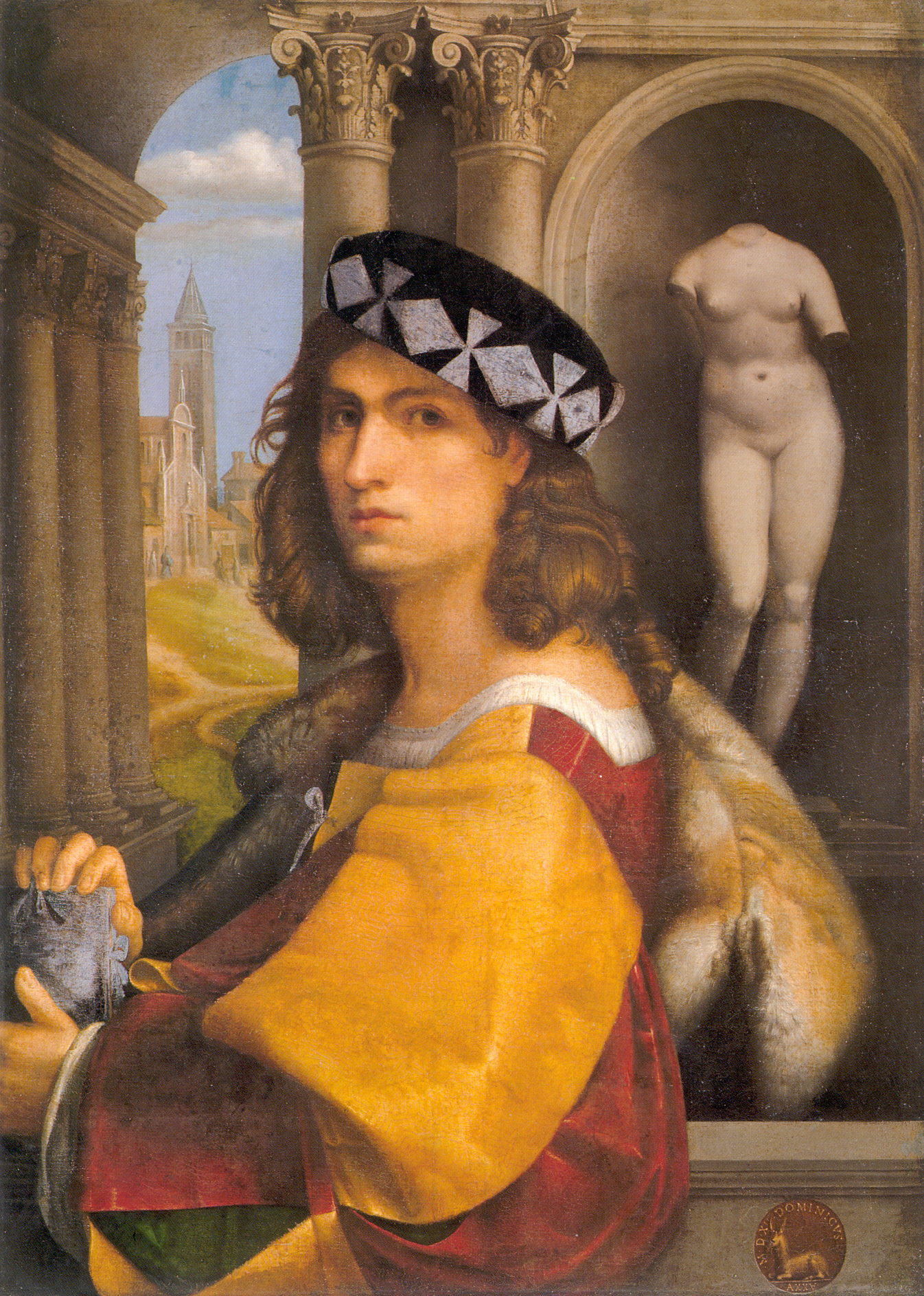
Domenico Capriolo. Man in a Fur

== Bibliography ==
- (in French) L. De Fuccia, Pour "la satisfaction tant attendue" et "les désirs passionnés" du marquis de Seignelay: une correspondance inédite sur le voyage d'Alvarez en Italie, in Revue de l'art, 152, 2006, pp. 37–52.
- (in Italian) D. Dossi, La collezione di Agostino e Gian Giacomo Giusti, in Verona Illustrata, 21, 2008, pp. 109–126.
- (in Italian) D. Dossi, I quadri già Muselli all'Ermitage: precisazioni su alcune provenienze, in Verona Illustrata, 26, 2013, pp. 49–66.
- (in Italian) D. Dossi, Alessandro Turchi nella Francia del Seicento: opere, mercato, commissioni, in ArtItalies, 19, 2013, pp. 10–21.
- (in Italian) D. Dossi, La Galleria Curtoni di Verona: la sua dispersione e qualche recupero, in Arte Veneta, 69, 2014, pp. 169–176.
- (in Italian) D. Dossi, La scultura moderna nelle collezioni veronesi fra Cinque e Seicento, in Arte Cristiana, 102, 2014, 883, pp. 311–316.
- (in Italian) D. Dossi, La collezione Muselli di Verona. La quadreria negli anni ottanta del Seicento, in Studi di Storia dell'Arte, 25, 2015, pp. 187–198.
- (in Italian) D. Dossi, Collezionare disegni a Verona nel Seicento: il caso Muselli, in Verona Illustrata, 28, 2015, pp. 115–132.
