= Musella =

Musella may refer to:

- Musella (plant), a flowering plant genus in the banana and plantain family, considered by some authorities to be a taxonomic synonym of the genus Ensete
- Musella, Georgia, an unincorporated community in the United States
- Lino Musella (born 1980), Italian actor
- Teddy Musella (born 2009), American racing driver

== See also ==
- Muselli
