= The Healing of Tobit (Domenico Fetti) =

Painting by Domenico Fetti

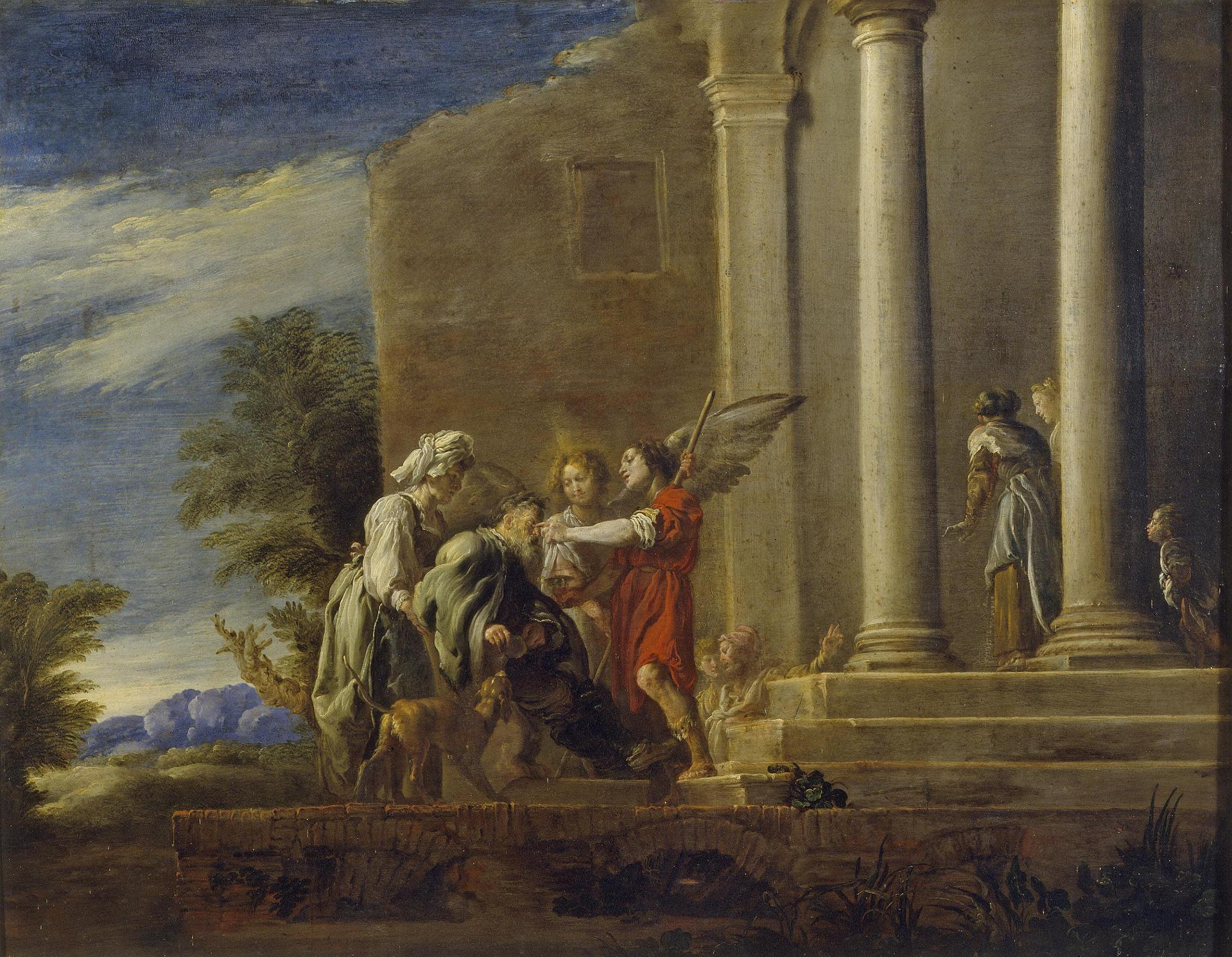
The Healing of Tobit (1621–1622) by Domenico Fetti

The Healing of Tobit or Tobias Healing His Father is a 1621–1622 oil-on-panel painting by Domenico Fetti, now in Room 232 (New Hermitage) of the Hermitage Museum. It shows a scene from the Book of Tobit (11: 10–14), with the archangel Raphael helping Tobias to heal his blind father Tobit. Several autograph and non-autograph copies of the work also survive, including an autograph in the Barbarigo family collection in Venice which entered the Hermitage in 1850 but was later sold, probably to P V Delarov, after whose death it was auctioned at Georges Petit in Paris in 1914.

The work was listed in an inventory of Cristoforo and Francesco Muselli's collection in Verona in 1662. In 1685 Cristoforo Muselli's heirs sold the whole family art collection to Louis Alvarez, a merchant in France, with Healing ending up in the Orleans Collection and later Julien's collection. In 1767 Julien's whole collection was auctioned off in Paris, with Dmitri Alekseyevich Gallitzin acquiring Healing for Catherine the Great.
