= Circumcision of Christ (Bellini) =

Painting by the studio of Giovanni Bellini

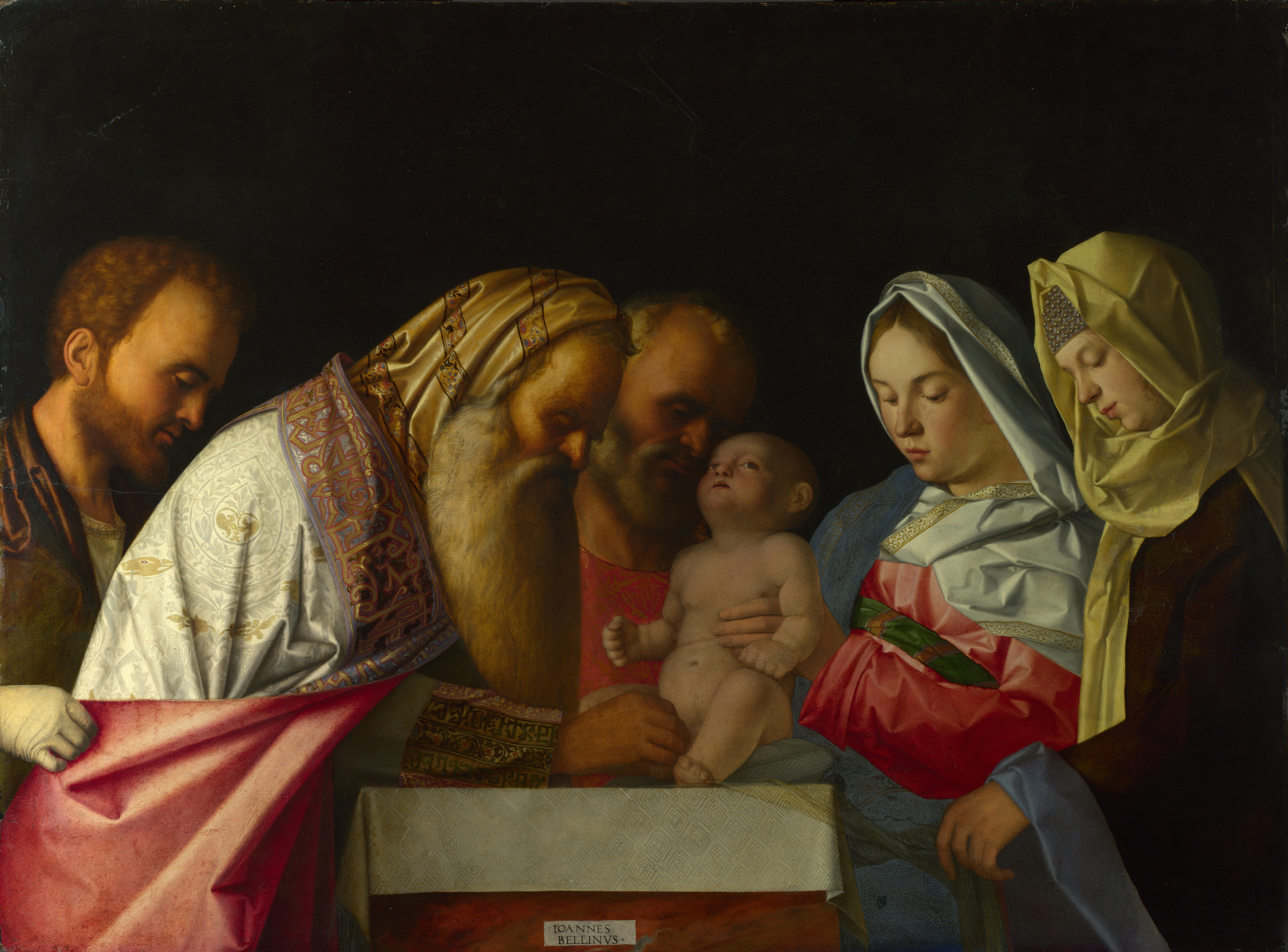
- Artist: Studio of Giovanni Bellini
- Year: c.1500
- Medium: oil on panel
- Dimensions: 74.9 cm × 102.2 cm (29.5 in × 40.2 in)
- Location: National Gallery, London
- Website: Catalogue entry

Circumcision of Christ is a c.1500 oil-on-panel painting by the studio of the Italian Renaissance artist Giovanni Bellini. It is now in the National Gallery, London, to which it was presented by George Howard, 9th Earl of Carlisle in 1895. It shows the Circumcision of Christ, a common subject in 16th and 17th century Venetian painting. It is attributed to Bellini's studio although it bears his signature on a cartouche on the base of the altar. Several later painters used the composition as a model.

== See also ==
- List of works by Giovanni Bellini
