= Hoplitimyia mutabilis =

Scientific classification
- Kingdom: Animalia
- Phylum: Arthropoda
- Class: Insecta
- Order: Diptera
- Family: Stratiomyidae
- Subfamily: Stratiomyinae
- Tribe: Stratiomyini
- Genus: Hoplitimyia
- Species: H. mutabilis

Binomial name
- Hoplitimyia mutabilis (Fabricius, 1787)

Synonyms
- Stratiomys mutabilis Fabricius, 1787; Musca variabilis Gmelin, 1790; Stratiomys sericeiventris Róndani, 1848

Species of fly

Hoplitimyia mutabilis is a species of soldier fly in the family Stratiomyidae.

== Distribution ==
United States, Argentina, Brazil, Costa Rica, El Salvador, French Guiana, Honduras, Mexico, Nicaragua, Panama.
