= Hedriodiscus varipes =

Scientific classification
- Kingdom: Animalia
- Phylum: Arthropoda
- Class: Insecta
- Order: Diptera
- Family: Stratiomyidae
- Subfamily: Stratiomyinae
- Tribe: Stratiomyini
- Genus: Hedriodiscus
- Species: H. varipes

Binomial name
- Hedriodiscus varipes (Loew, 1866)

Synonyms
- Odontomyia varipes Loew, 1866; Odontomyia alberta Curran, 1923

Species of fly

Hedriodiscus varipes is a species of soldier fly in the family Stratiomyidae.

== Distribution ==
Canada, United States.
