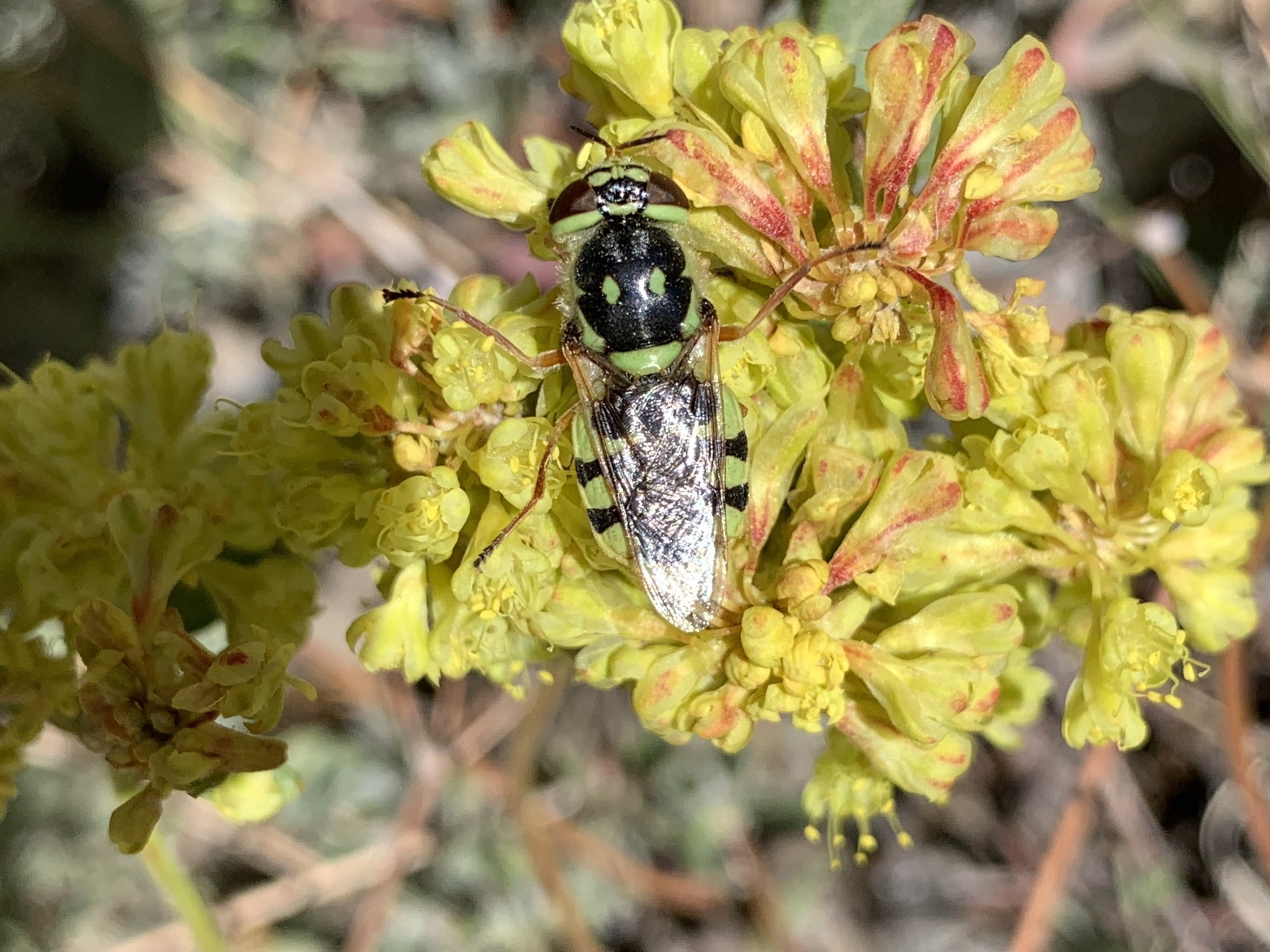

Scientific classification
- Kingdom: Animalia
- Phylum: Arthropoda
- Class: Insecta
- Order: Diptera
- Family: Stratiomyidae
- Subfamily: Stratiomyinae
- Tribe: Stratiomyini
- Genus: Hedriodiscus
- Species: H. binotatus

Binomial name
- Hedriodiscus binotatus (Loew, 1866)

Synonyms
- Odontomyia binotata Loew, 1866; Odonotmyia bicolor Day, 1882; Odontomyia innotata Curran, 1927; Odontomyia truquii var. innotata Curran, 1927

= Hedriodiscus binotatus =

Species of fly

Hedriodiscus binotatus is a species of soldier fly in the family Stratiomyidae.

== Distribution ==
Canada, United States, Mexico.
