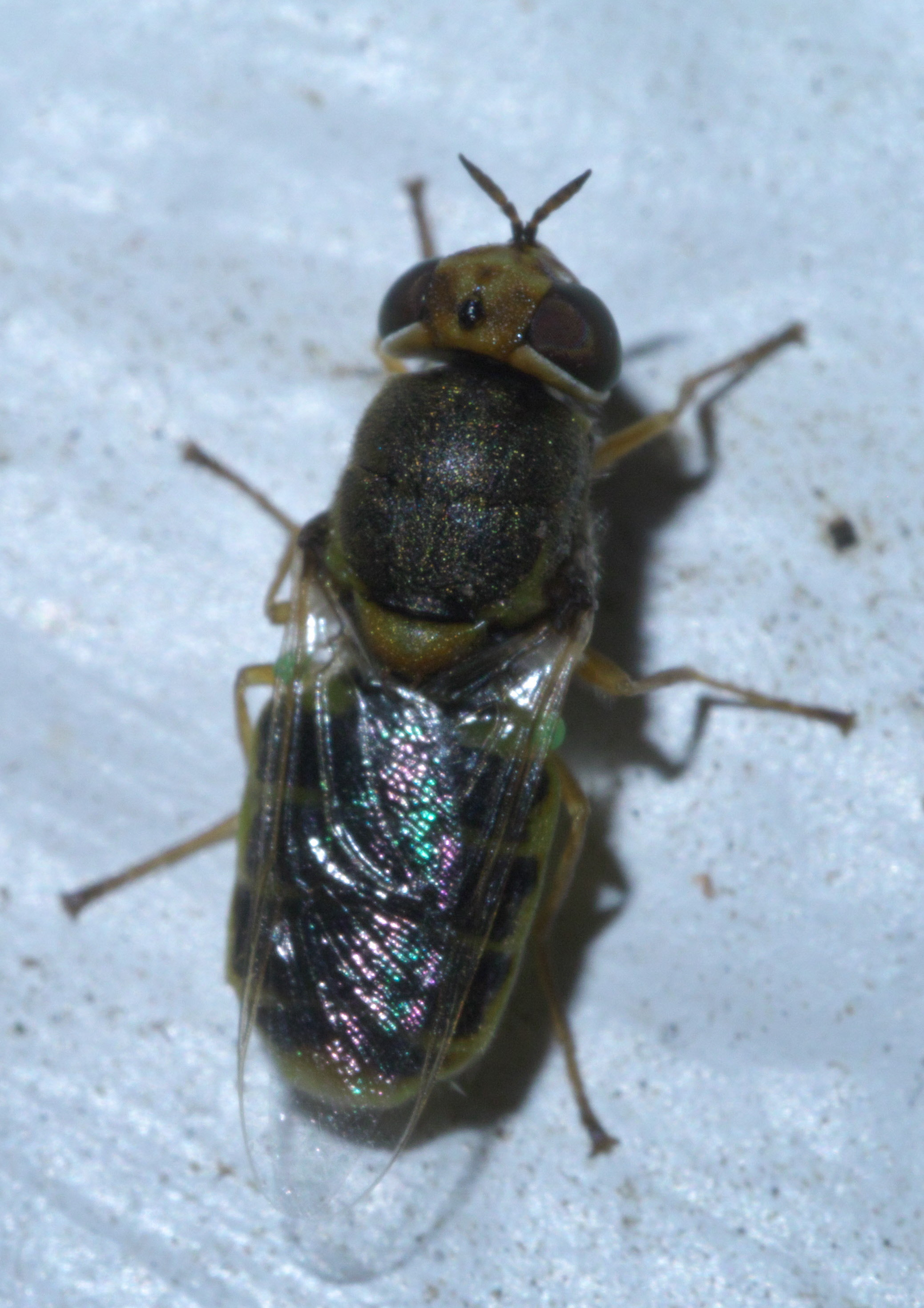

Scientific classification
- Kingdom: Animalia
- Phylum: Arthropoda
- Class: Insecta
- Order: Diptera
- Family: Stratiomyidae
- Subfamily: Stratiomyinae
- Tribe: Stratiomyini
- Genus: Hedriodiscus
- Species: H. vertebratus

Binomial name
- Hedriodiscus vertebratus (Say, 1824)

Synonyms
- Odontomyia vertebrata Say, 1824; Odontomyia willistoni Day, 1882

= Hedriodiscus vertebratus =

Species of fly

Hedriodiscus vertebratus is a species of soldier fly in the family Stratiomyidae.

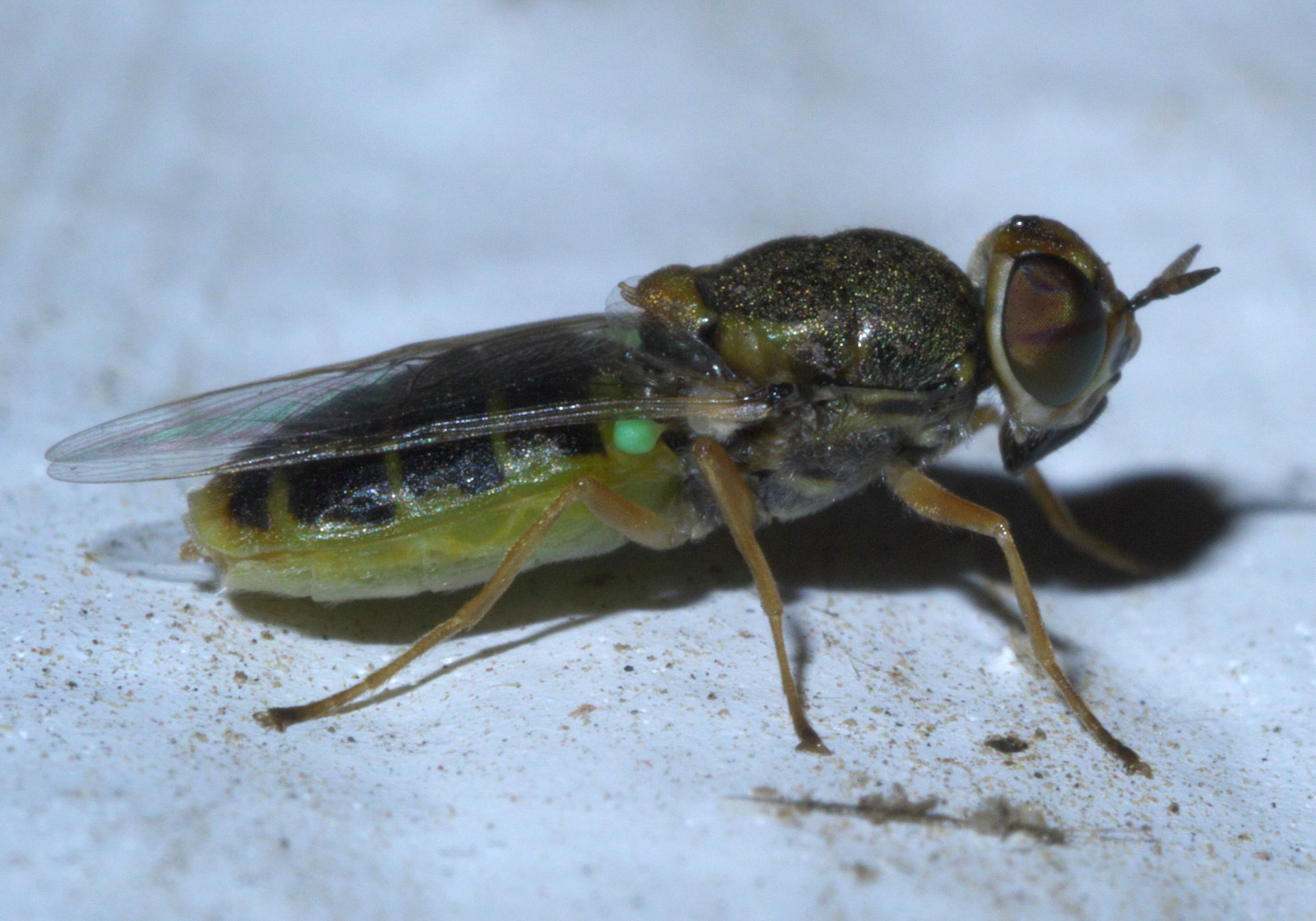

== Distribution ==
Canada, United States, Mexico.
