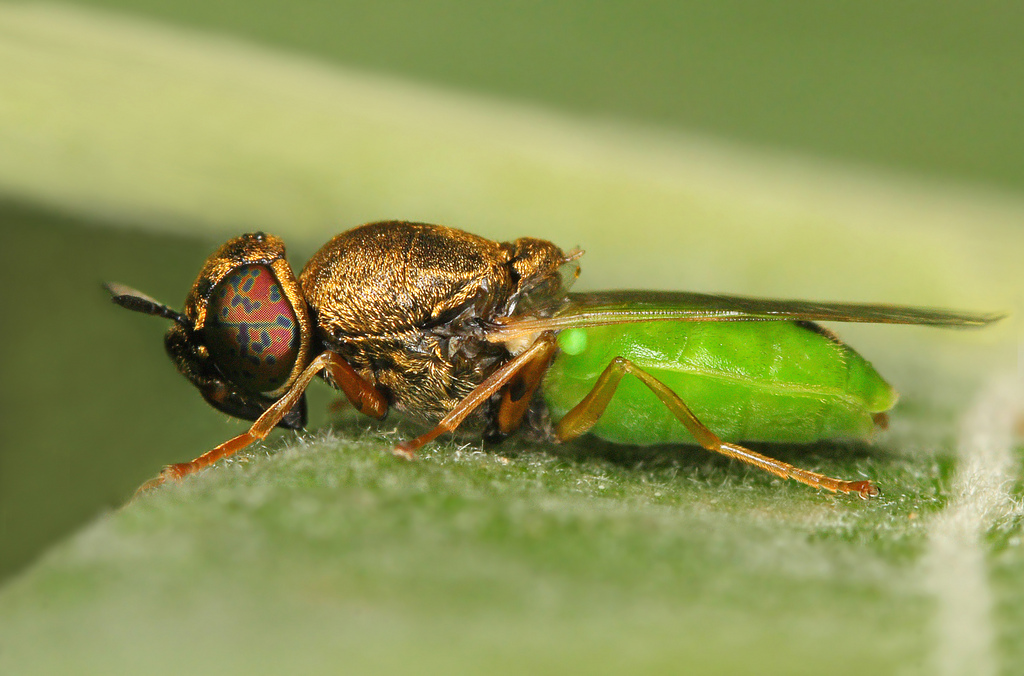

Scientific classification
- Kingdom: Animalia
- Phylum: Arthropoda
- Clade: Pancrustacea
- Class: Insecta
- Order: Diptera
- Family: Stratiomyidae
- Subfamily: Stratiomyinae
- Tribe: Stratiomyini
- Genus: Oplodontha
- Species: O. viridula

Binomial name
- Oplodontha viridula (Fabricius, 1775)

Synonyms
- Stratiomys viridula Fabricius, 1775; Musca microleon Harris, 1776; Oplodontha microleon (Harris, 1776); Oplodontha subvittata (Meigen, 1822); Stratiomys subvittata Meigen, 1822; Musca viridata Villers, 1789; Stratiomys canina Panzer, 1798; Stratiomys jejuna Schrank, 1803; Odontomyia dentata Meigen, 1804; Odontomyia holosericea Olivier, 1811; Odontomyia lunulata]] Macquart, 1826; Musca jejuna Schrank, 1837; Odontomyia personata Loew, 1846; Odontomyia interrupta Loew, 1846; Odontomyia subvitata Schiner, 1855; Odontomyia heydenii Jaennicke, 1866; Odontomyia caniina Brunetti, 1889; Odontomyia atrata Verrall, 1909

= Oplodontha viridula =

Species of fly

Oplodontha viridula, the common green colonel, is a European species of soldier fly.

== Description ==
Body length 6–8 mm. Purple eyes in life with bands and spots. Thorax brilliant black, coarsely punctured and with short dull yellow pubescence. Scutellum entirely black with two yellow spines. Yellowish legs (female). Abdomen whitish, yellow or leaf green with all intermediate ranges; black longitudinal dorsal median band also variable in shape and extent than the background pastel color. The larva is light or dark brownish with different longitudinal stripes or markings: on the dorsal side it has short, depressed hairs, on the ventral side the middle space of the segments have somewhat longish hairs. The length is 16 mm.

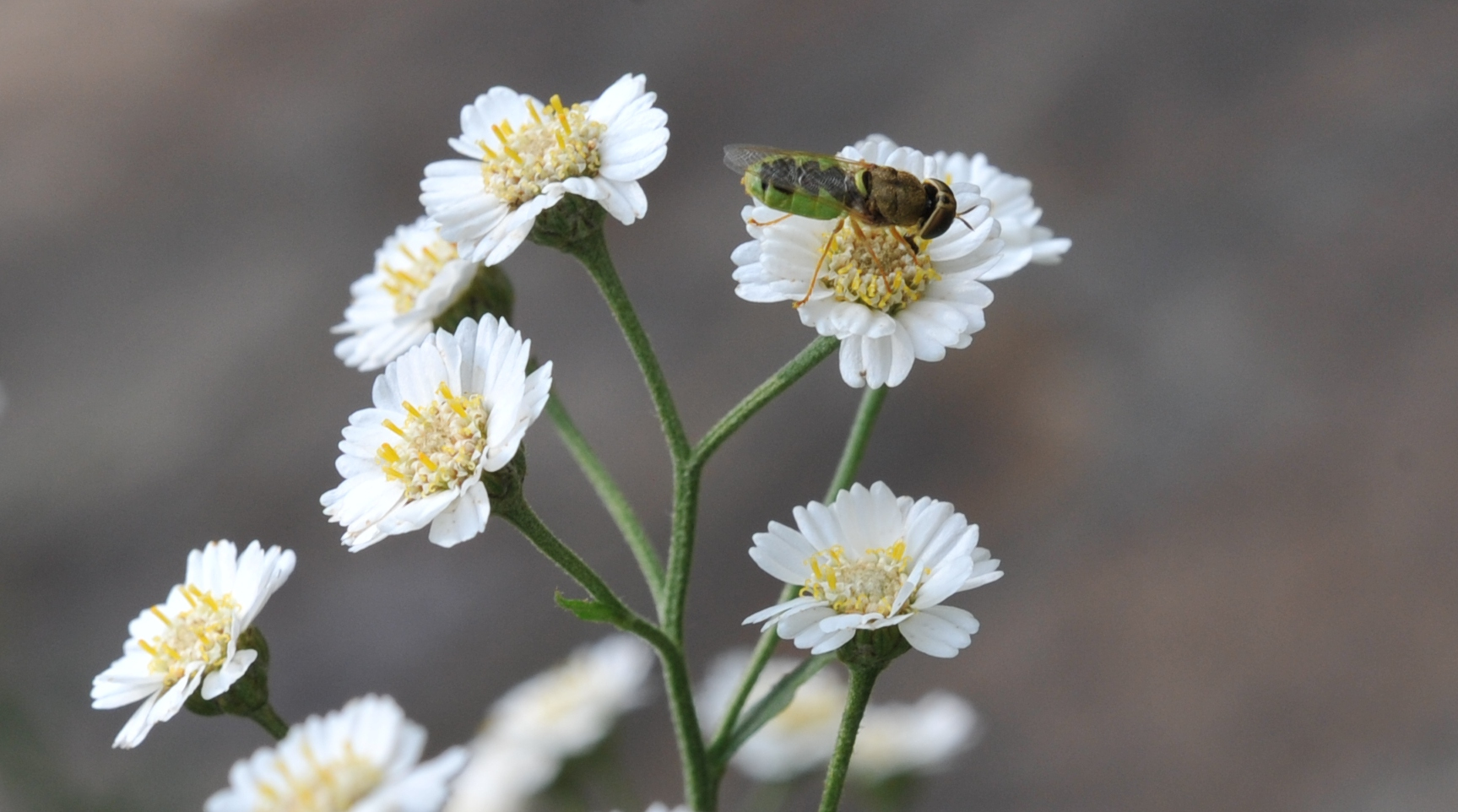
flower feeding

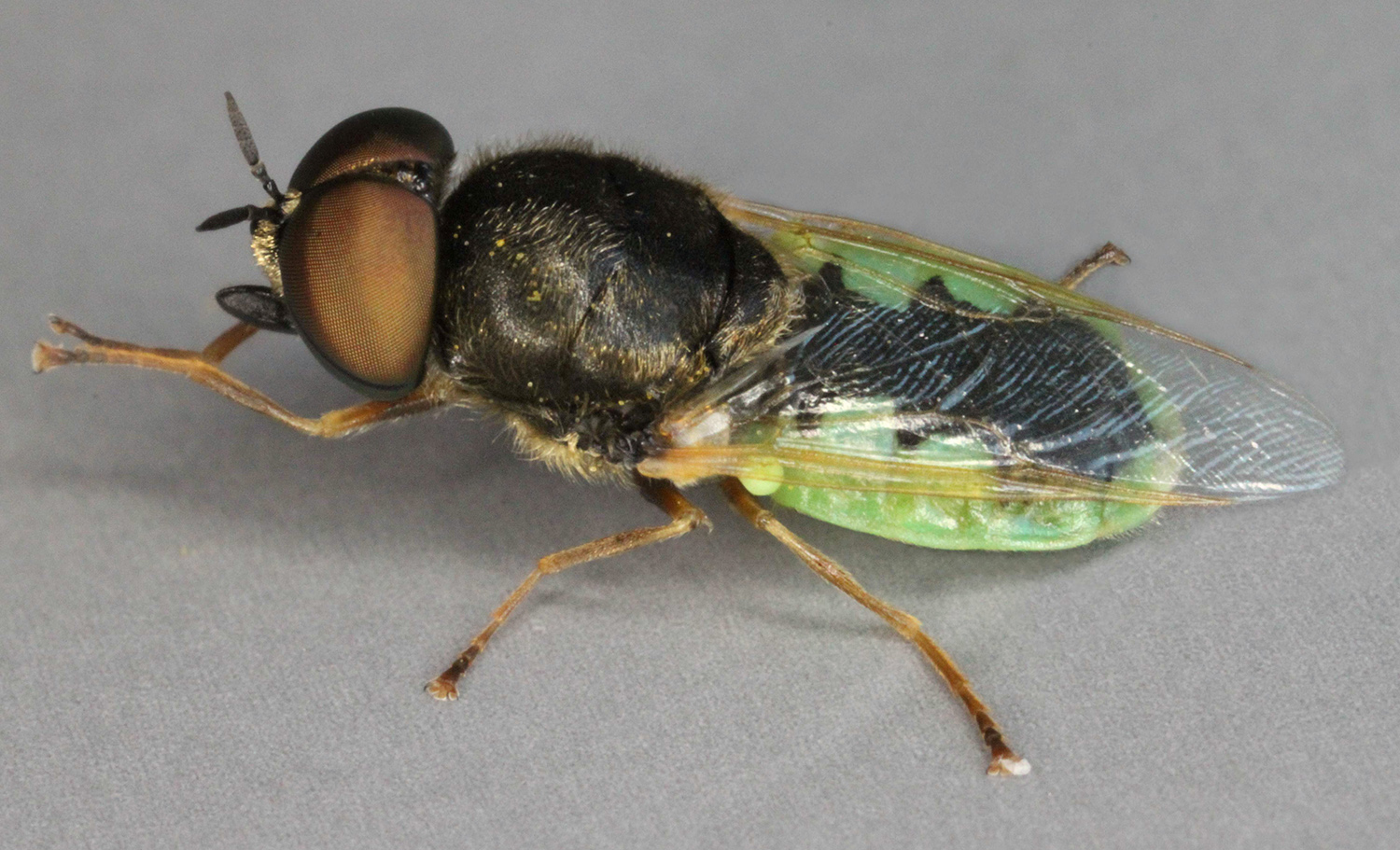
dorsal view

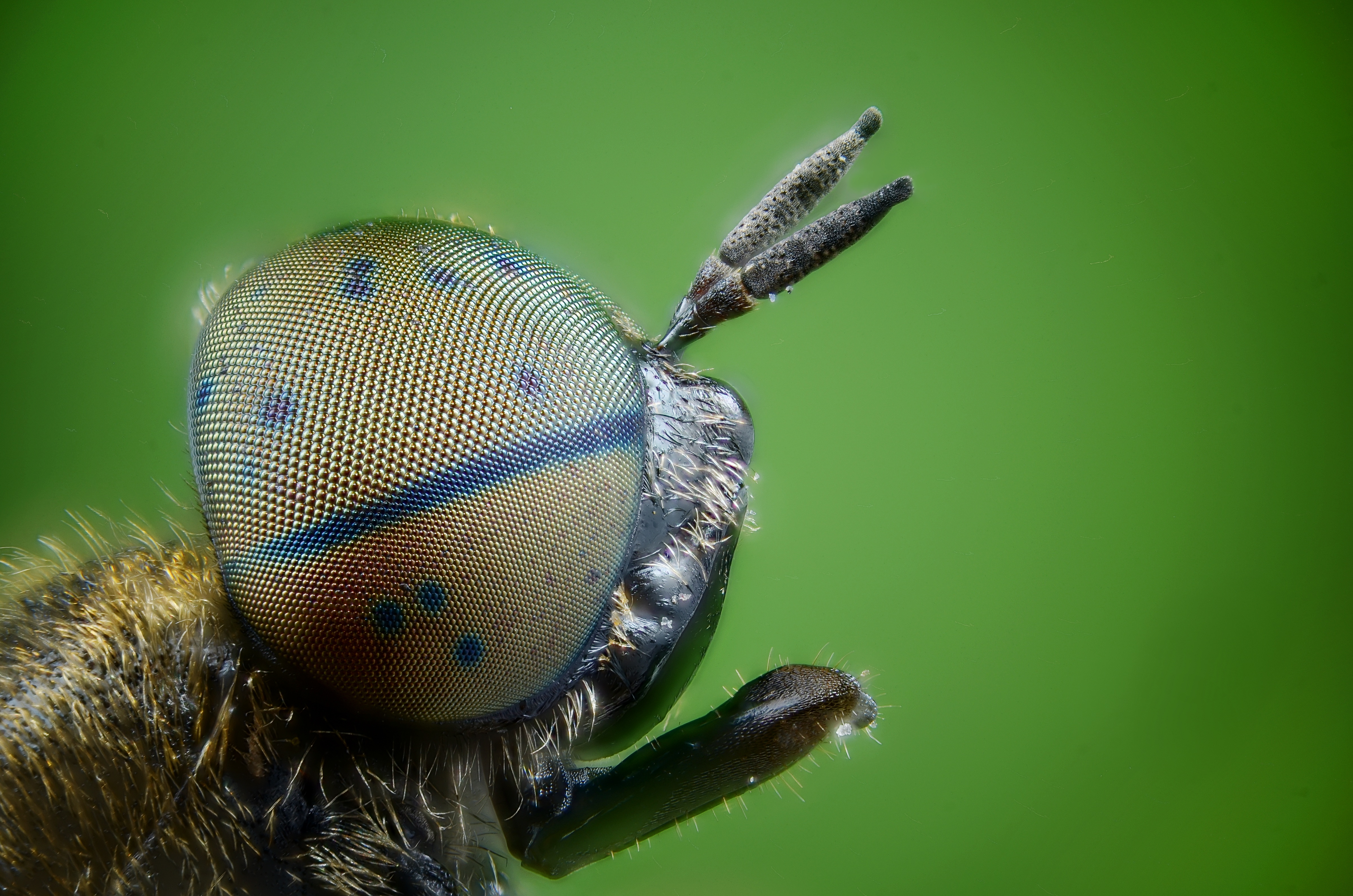
head

larva in a pool

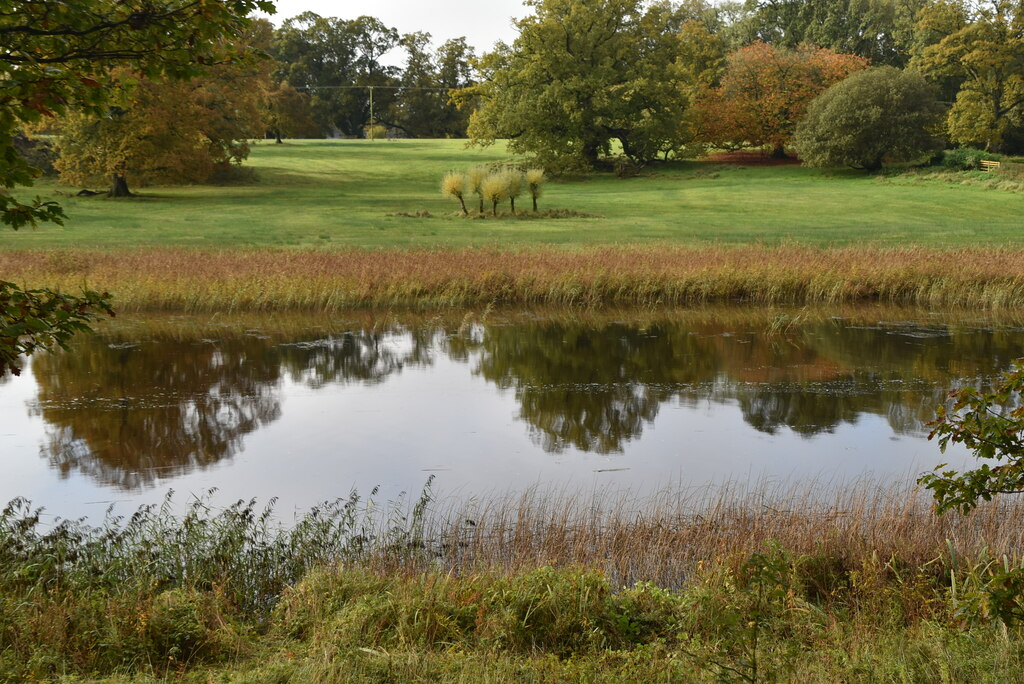
habitat Ireland

== Biology ==
The habitat is wetland biotope, such as marshes, meadows with locks, salt marshes and river valleys- in humid places, on herbs, Phragmites, Cnicus Adults are found from the end of April to the beginning of October. Adults feed on pollen and nectar of Achillea millefolium ........

== Distribution ==
Throughout the Palearctic.
