= Psellidotus comma =

Scientific classification
- Kingdom: Animalia
- Phylum: Arthropoda
- Class: Insecta
- Order: Diptera
- Family: Stratiomyidae
- Subfamily: Stratiomyinae
- Tribe: Stratiomyini
- Genus: Psellidotus
- Species: P. comma

Binomial name
- Psellidotus comma (Williston, 1900)

Synonyms
- Odontomyia comma Williston, 1900

Species of soldier fly

Psellidotus comma is a species of soldier fly in the family Stratiomyidae.

== Distribution ==
Mexico.
