= Hedriodiscus leucogaster =

Scientific classification
- Kingdom: Animalia
- Phylum: Arthropoda
- Class: Insecta
- Order: Diptera
- Family: Stratiomyidae
- Subfamily: Stratiomyinae
- Tribe: Stratiomyini
- Genus: Hedriodiscus
- Species: H. leucogaster

Binomial name
- Hedriodiscus leucogaster (James, 1933)

Synonyms
- Odontomyia leucogaster James, 1933

Species of fly

Hedriodiscus leucogaster is a species of soldier fly in the family Stratiomyidae.

== Distribution ==
The species is primarily sound in United States, Colombia, and Mexico.
