= Hoplitimyia aleus =

Scientific classification
- Kingdom: Animalia
- Phylum: Arthropoda
- Class: Insecta
- Order: Diptera
- Family: Stratiomyidae
- Subfamily: Stratiomyinae
- Tribe: Stratiomyini
- Genus: Hoplitimyia
- Species: H. aleus

Binomial name
- Hoplitimyia aleus (Walker, 1849)

Synonyms
- Acrochaeta aleus Norman E. Woodley

Species of fly

Hoplitimyia aleus is a species of soldier fly in the family Stratiomyidae.

== Distribution ==
Brazil.
