= Psellidotus defectus =

Scientific classification
- Kingdom: Animalia
- Phylum: Arthropoda
- Class: Insecta
- Order: Diptera
- Family: Stratiomyidae
- Subfamily: Stratiomyinae
- Tribe: Stratiomyini
- Genus: Psellidotus
- Species: P. defectus

Binomial name
- Psellidotus defectus (James, 1952)

Synonyms
- Labostigmina defecta James, 1952

Species of soldier fly

Psellidotus defectus is a species of soldier fly in the family Stratiomyidae.

== Distribution ==
United States.
