= Psellidotus annamariae =

Scientific classification
- Kingdom: Animalia
- Phylum: Arthropoda
- Class: Insecta
- Order: Diptera
- Family: Stratiomyidae
- Subfamily: Stratiomyinae
- Tribe: Stratiomyini
- Genus: Psellidotus
- Species: P. annamariae

Binomial name
- Psellidotus annamariae (Brimley, 1925)

Synonyms
- Odontomyia annamariae Brimley, 1925

Species of soldier fly

Psellidotus annamariae is a species of soldier fly in the family Stratiomyidae.

== Distribution ==
United States.
