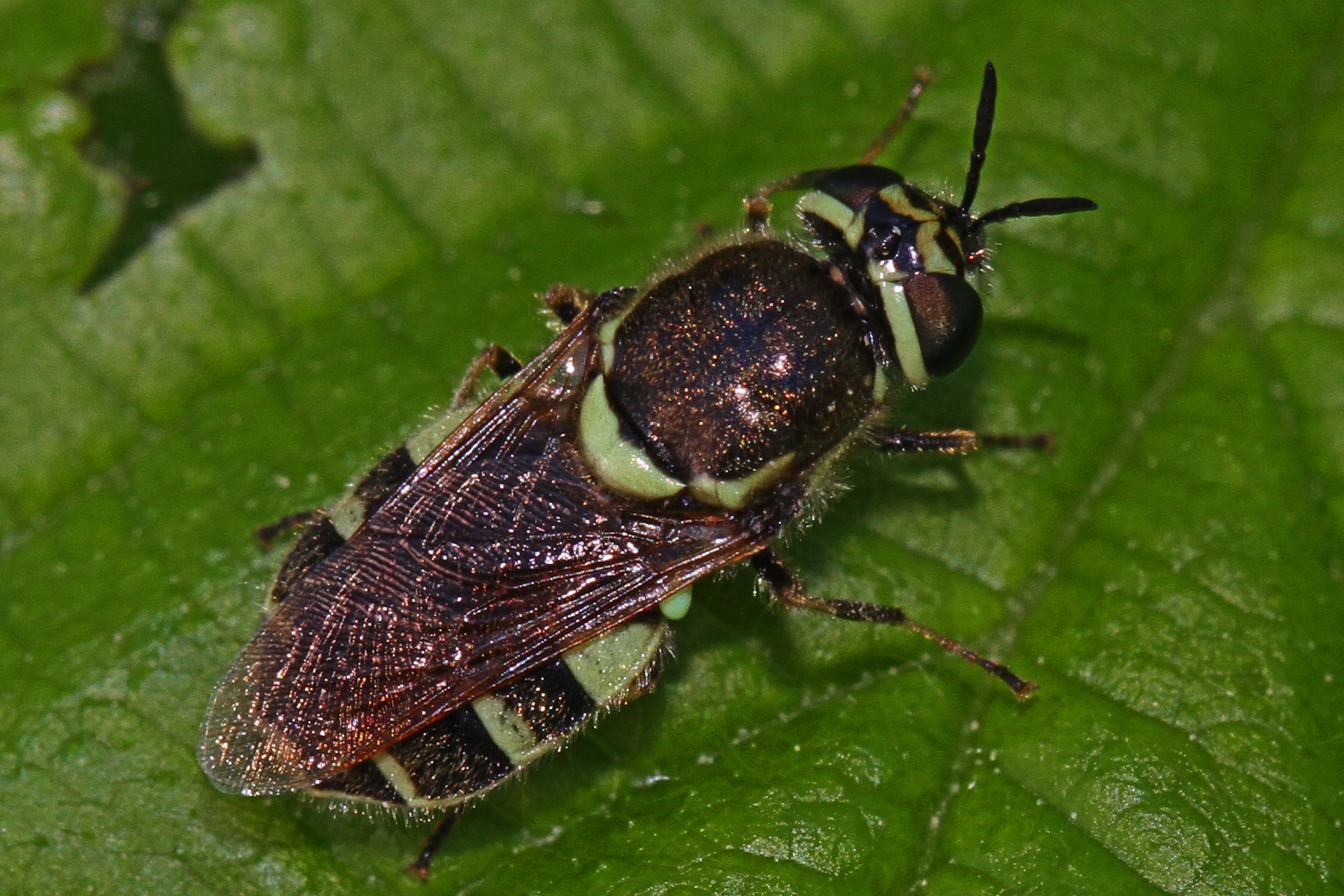

Scientific classification
- Kingdom: Animalia
- Phylum: Arthropoda
- Class: Insecta
- Order: Diptera
- Family: Stratiomyidae
- Subfamily: Stratiomyinae
- Tribe: Stratiomyini
- Genus: Psellidotus
- Species: P. hieroglyphicus

Binomial name
- Psellidotus hieroglyphicus (Olivier, 1811)

Synonyms
- Odontomyia hieroglyphica Olivier, 1811; Odontomyia fallax Johnson, 1895; Odontomyia johnsoni Curran, 1925

= Psellidotus hieroglyphicus =

Species of fly

Psellidotus hieroglyphicus is a species of soldier fly in the family Stratiomyidae.

== Distribution ==
United States.
