= Hoplitimyia costalis =

Scientific classification
- Kingdom: Animalia
- Phylum: Arthropoda
- Class: Insecta
- Order: Diptera
- Family: Stratiomyidae
- Subfamily: Stratiomyinae
- Tribe: Stratiomyini
- Genus: Hoplitimyia
- Species: H. costalis

Binomial name
- Hoplitimyia costalis (Walker, 1836)

Synonyms
- Cyphomyia costalis Walker, 1836

Species of fly

Hoplitimyia costalis is a species of soldier fly in the family Stratiomyidae.

== Distribution ==
Brazil.
