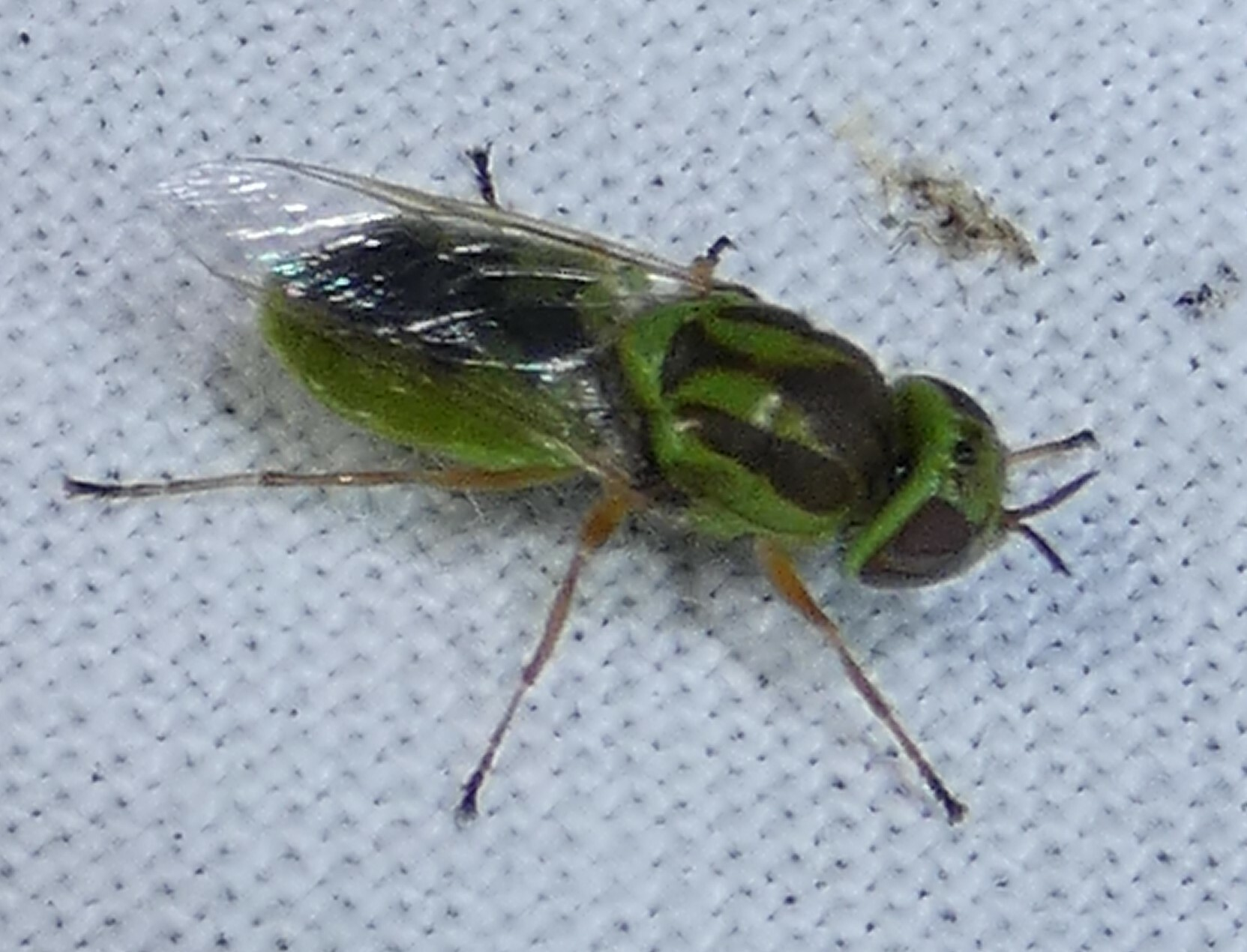

Scientific classification
- Kingdom: Animalia
- Phylum: Arthropoda
- Class: Insecta
- Order: Diptera
- Family: Stratiomyidae
- Subfamily: Stratiomyinae
- Tribe: Stratiomyini
- Genus: Hedriodiscus
- Species: H. trivittatus

Binomial name
- Hedriodiscus trivittatus (Say, 1829)

Synonyms
- Odontomyia tritaeniata Bellardi, 1859; Stratiomys trivittata Say, 1829; Odontomyia tritoeniata Giglio-Tos, 1893

= Hedriodiscus trivittatus =

Species of fly

Hedriodiscus trivittatus is a species of soldier fly in the family Stratiomyidae.

== Distribution ==
United States, Colombia, Dominican Republic, El Salvador, Guatemala, Mexico.
