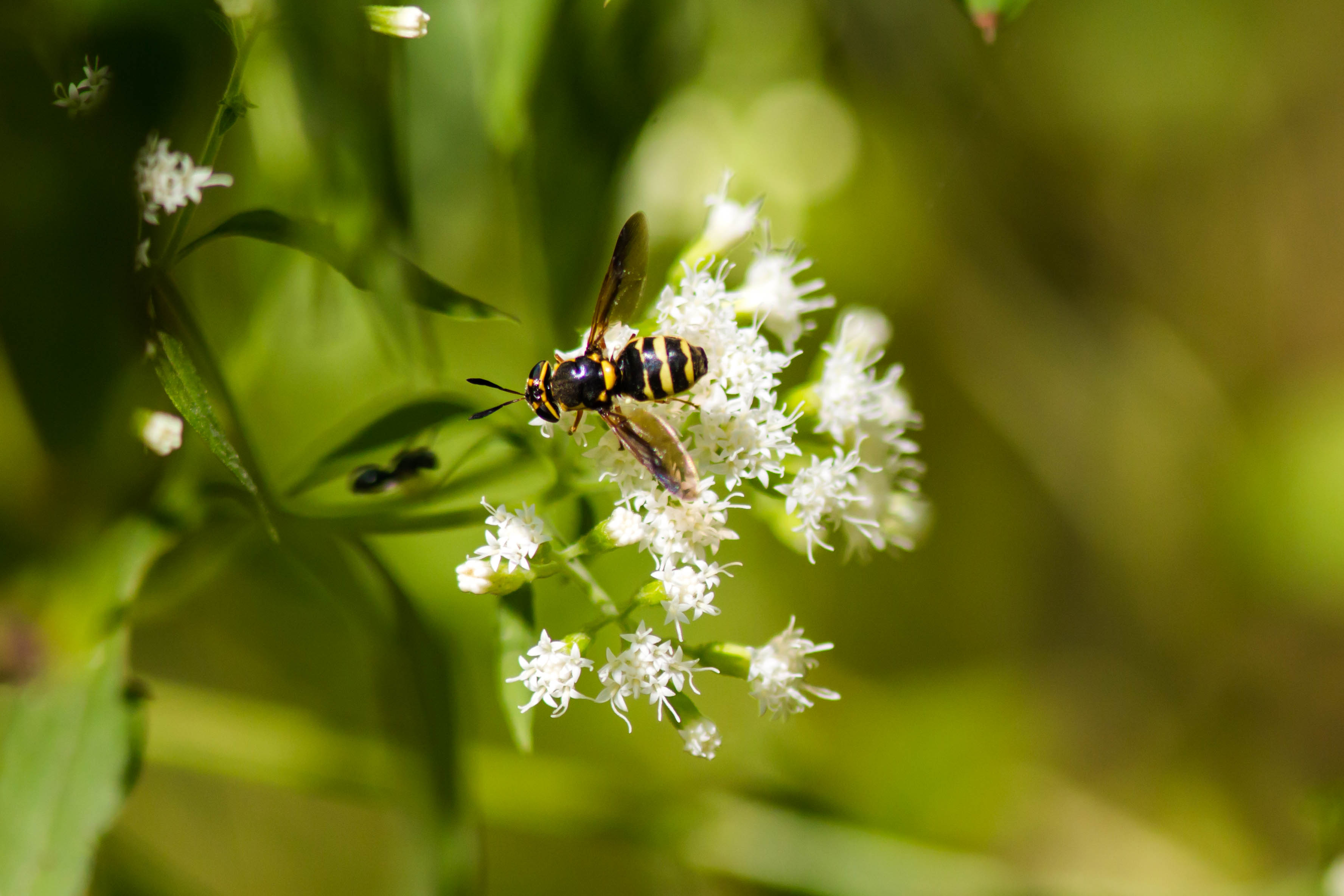
- Hoplitimyia constans

Scientific classification
- Kingdom: Animalia
- Phylum: Arthropoda
- Class: Insecta
- Order: Diptera
- Family: Stratiomyidae
- Subfamily: Stratiomyinae
- Tribe: Stratiomyini
- Genus: Hoplitimyia
- Species: H. constans

Binomial name
- Hoplitimyia constans Loew, 1872

Synonyms
- Stratiomyia constans Loew, 1872

= Hoplitimyia constans =

Species of fly

Hoplitimyia constans is a species of soldier fly in the family Stratiomyidae.

== Distribution ==
United States.
