= Psellidotus snowi =

Scientific classification
- Kingdom: Animalia
- Phylum: Arthropoda
- Clade: Pancrustacea
- Class: Insecta
- Order: Diptera
- Family: Stratiomyidae
- Subfamily: Stratiomyinae
- Tribe: Stratiomyini
- Genus: Psellidotus
- Species: P. snowi

Binomial name
- Psellidotus snowi (Hart, 1896)

Synonyms
- Odontomyia snowi Hart, 1896

Species of soldier fly

Psellidotus snowi is a species of soldier fly in the family Stratiomyidae.

== Distribution ==
United States.
