= Hedriodiscus truquii =

Scientific classification
- Kingdom: Animalia
- Phylum: Arthropoda
- Class: Insecta
- Order: Diptera
- Family: Stratiomyidae
- Subfamily: Stratiomyinae
- Tribe: Stratiomyini
- Genus: Hedriodiscus
- Species: H. truquii

Binomial name
- Hedriodiscus truquii (Bellardi, 1859)

Synonyms
- Odonthomyia truquii Bellardi, 1859; Odonthomyia truquii var. currani James, 1932

Species of fly

Hedriodiscus truquii is a species of soldier fly in the family Stratiomyidae.

== Distribution ==
United States, El Salvador, Mexico.
