= Caloparyphus flaviventris =

Scientific classification
- Kingdom: Animalia
- Phylum: Arthropoda
- Class: Insecta
- Order: Diptera
- Family: Stratiomyidae
- Subfamily: Stratiomyinae
- Tribe: Oxycerini
- Genus: Caloparyphus
- Species: C. flaviventris

Binomial name
- Caloparyphus flaviventris (James, 1936)

Synonyms
- Euparyphus flaviventris James, 1936

Species of fly

Caloparyphus flaviventris is a species of soldier fly in the family Stratiomyidae.

== Distribution ==
Canada, United States.
