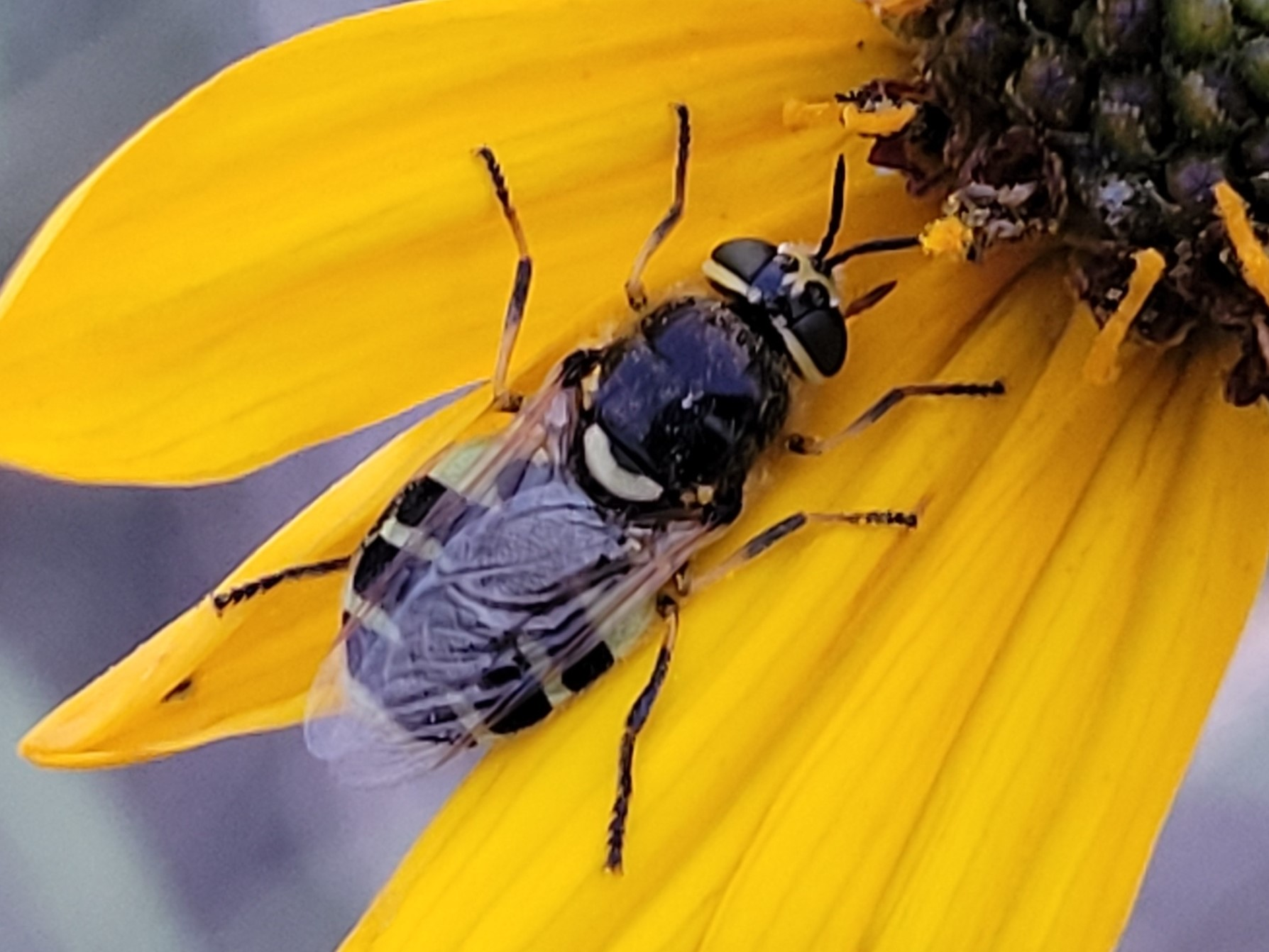

Scientific classification
- Kingdom: Animalia
- Phylum: Arthropoda
- Class: Insecta
- Order: Diptera
- Family: Stratiomyidae
- Tribe: Stratiomyini
- Genus: Anoplodonta
- Species: A. nigrirostris

Binomial name
- Anoplodonta nigrirostris (Loew, 1866)

Synonyms
- Odontomyia nigrirostris Loew, 1866; Odontomyia nuda James, 1932

= Anoplodonta nigrirostris =

Species of fly

Anoplodonta nigrirostris is a species of soldier fly in the family Stratiomyidae.

== Distribution ==
Canada, United States, Mexico.
