= Euparyphus elegans =

Scientific classification
- Kingdom: Animalia
- Phylum: Arthropoda
- Class: Insecta
- Order: Diptera
- Family: Stratiomyidae
- Subfamily: Stratiomyinae
- Tribe: Oxycerini
- Genus: Euparyphus
- Species: E. elegans

Binomial name
- Euparyphus elegans (Wiedemann, 1830)

Synonyms
- Cyphomyia elegans Wiedemann, 1830

Species of fly

Euparyphus elegans is a species of soldier flies in the tribe Oxycerini.

== Distribution ==
Mexico.
