= Caloparyphus tetraspilus =

Scientific classification
- Kingdom: Animalia
- Phylum: Arthropoda
- Class: Insecta
- Order: Diptera
- Family: Stratiomyidae
- Subfamily: Stratiomyinae
- Tribe: Oxycerini
- Genus: Caloparyphus
- Species: C. tetraspilus

Binomial name
- Caloparyphus tetraspilus (Loew, 1866)

Synonyms
- Euparyphus bellus Loew, 1866; Euparyphus tetraspilus Loew, 1866; Stratyomys quadripunctata Johnson, 1925

Species of fly

Caloparyphus tetraspilus is a species of soldier fly in the family Stratiomyidae.

== Distribution ==
Canada, United States.
