= Euparyphus patagius =

Scientific classification
- Kingdom: Animalia
- Phylum: Arthropoda
- Class: Insecta
- Order: Diptera
- Family: Stratiomyidae
- Subfamily: Stratiomyinae
- Tribe: Oxycerini
- Genus: Euparyphus
- Species: E. patagius

Binomial name
- Euparyphus patagius Quist, 1973

Synonyms
- Euparyphus (Nigriparyphus) patagius Quist, 1973

Species of fly

Euparyphus patagius is a species of soldier fly in the family Stratiomyidae.

== Distribution ==
Mexico.
