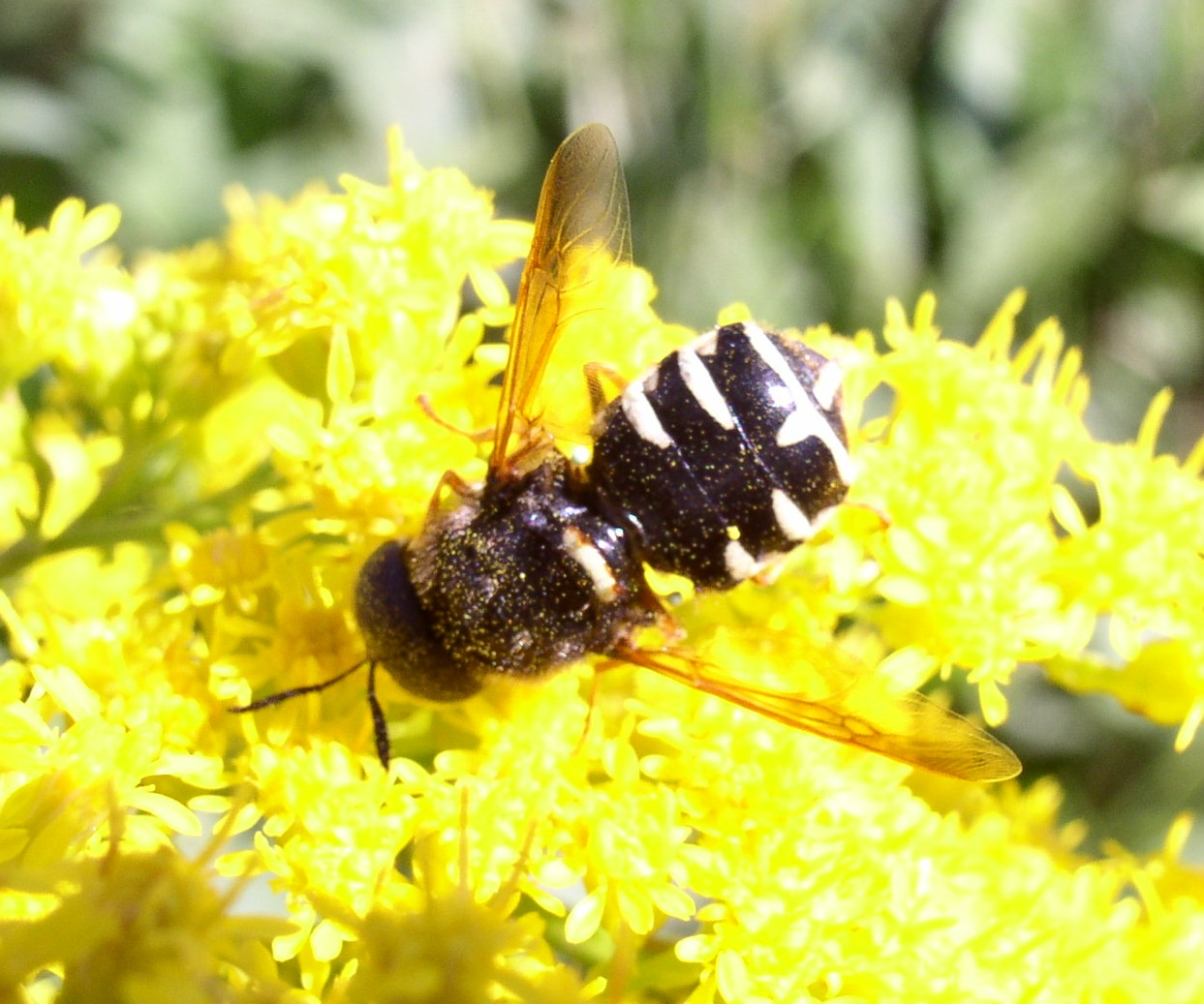
- S. normula on Goldenrod

Scientific classification
- Kingdom: Animalia
- Phylum: Arthropoda
- Class: Insecta
- Order: Diptera
- Family: Stratiomyidae
- Subfamily: Stratiomyinae
- Tribe: Stratiomyini
- Genus: Stratiomys
- Species: S. normula

Binomial name
- Stratiomys normula (Loew, 1866)

Synonyms
- Stratyomys ischiaca Harris, 1835; Stratiomyia apicula Loew, 1866; Stratiomyia normula Loew, 1866; Stratiomyia notata Loew, 1866; Stratiomyia quaternaria Loew, 1866; Stratiomyia senaria Loew, 1866; Stratiomyia unilimbata Loew, 1866; Stratiomys angulicincta James, 1932; Stratiomys jonesi James, 1932; Stratiomys wyomingensis James, 1932

= Stratiomys normula =

Species of fly

Stratiomys normula is a species of soldier fly in the family Stratiomyidae.

== Distribution ==
Canada, United States.
