= Euparyphus bistriatus =

Scientific classification
- Kingdom: Animalia
- Phylum: Arthropoda
- Class: Insecta
- Order: Diptera
- Family: Stratiomyidae
- Subfamily: Stratiomyinae
- Tribe: Oxycerini
- Genus: Euparyphus
- Species: E. bistriatus

Binomial name
- Euparyphus bistriatus Williston, 1896

Species of fly

Euparyphus bistriatus is a species of soldier flies in the tribe Oxycerini.

== Distribution ==
St. Vincent.
