= Caloparyphus decemmaculatus =

Scientific classification
- Kingdom: Animalia
- Phylum: Arthropoda
- Class: Insecta
- Order: Diptera
- Family: Stratiomyidae
- Subfamily: Stratiomyinae
- Tribe: Oxycerini
- Genus: Caloparyphus
- Species: C. decemmaculatus

Binomial name
- Caloparyphus decemmaculatus (Osten Sacken, 1886)

Synonyms
- Euparhyphus decemmaculatus Osten Sacken, 1886

Species of fly

Caloparyphus decemmaculatus is a species of soldier fly in the family Stratiomyidae.

== Distribution ==
United States, Mexico.
