= Vanoyia tenuicornis =

Scientific classification
- Kingdom: Animalia
- Phylum: Arthropoda
- Clade: Pancrustacea
- Class: Insecta
- Order: Diptera
- Family: Stratiomyidae
- Subfamily: Stratiomyinae
- Tribe: Oxycerini
- Genus: Vanoyia
- Species: V. tenuicornis

Binomial name
- Vanoyia tenuicornis (Macquart, 1834)

Synonyms
- Oxycera nigra Macquart, 1834; Oxycera tenuicornis Macquart, 1834; Oxycera longicornis Dale, 1842; Oxycera longicornis Walker, 1851; Vanoyia scutellata Villeneuve, 1908; Vanoyea separata Kertész, 1921

Species of fly

Vanoyia tenuicornis, the long-horned soldier, is a European species of soldier fly.

== Description ==
Vanoyia tenuicornis is strongly sexually dimorphic. The male has a black thorax and black abdomen, and no yellow pattern except on the notopleural suture and postalar callus. Legs mostly black. The female has an extensively yellow mesopleuron, and a yellow scutellum. Legs of the female are mainly orange. A remarkable species with long antenna; which apparently have no terminal style. The genus is distinguished from Oxycera solely "by the structure of the antenna. The third segment retains five clearly marked annuli, terminated by a sixth annulus which is blunt and hairy ie.it lacks the spine-like tip to the flagellum that is characteristic of Oxycera. Instead, t

== Distribution ==
Belgium, Britain, Ireland, France, Italy, Spain, North Africa
