= Caloparyphus crotchi =

Scientific classification
- Kingdom: Animalia
- Phylum: Arthropoda
- Class: Insecta
- Order: Diptera
- Family: Stratiomyidae
- Subfamily: Stratiomyinae
- Tribe: Oxycerini
- Genus: Caloparyphus
- Species: C. crotchi

Binomial name
- Caloparyphus crotchi (Osten Sacken, 1877)

Synonyms
- Oxycera crotchi Osten Sacken, 1877; Euparyphus septemmaculatus Adams, 1903

Species of fly

Caloparyphus crotchi is a species of soldier fly in the family Stratiomyidae.

== Distribution ==
Canada, United States.
