= Euparyphus tricolor =

Scientific classification
- Kingdom: Animalia
- Phylum: Arthropoda
- Class: Insecta
- Order: Diptera
- Family: Stratiomyidae
- Subfamily: Stratiomyinae
- Tribe: Oxycerini
- Genus: Euparyphus
- Species: E. tricolor

Binomial name
- Euparyphus tricolor Osten Sacken, 1886

Synonyms
- Euparhyphus tricolor Osten Sacken, 1886

Species of fly

Euparyphus tricolor is a species in the family Stratiomyidae ("soldier flies"), in the order Diptera.

== Distribution ==
United States, Mexico.
