= Metabasis =

Scientific classification
- Kingdom: Animalia
- Phylum: Arthropoda
- Class: Insecta
- Order: Diptera
- Family: Stratiomyidae
- Subfamily: Stratiomyinae
- Tribe: Stratiomyini
- Genus: Metabasis; Walker, 1851

Type species
- Metabasis rostratus Walker, 1851

Genus of flies

Metabasis is a genus of flies in the family Stratiomyidae.

== Species ==
- Metabasis rostratus Walker, 1851
