= Scapanocnema =

Scientific classification
- Kingdom: Animalia
- Phylum: Arthropoda
- Clade: Pancrustacea
- Class: Insecta
- Order: Diptera
- Family: Stratiomyidae
- Subfamily: Stratiomyinae
- Tribe: Stratiomyini
- Genus: Scapanocnema; Enderlein, 1914

Type species
- Scapanocnema spathulipes Enderlein, 1914

Genus of flies

Scapanocnema is a genus of flies in the family Stratiomyidae.

== Species ==
- Scapanocnema spathulipes Enderlein, 1914
