= Zulumyia =

Scientific classification
- Kingdom: Animalia
- Phylum: Arthropoda
- Class: Insecta
- Order: Diptera
- Family: Stratiomyidae
- Subfamily: Stratiomyinae
- Tribe: Stratiomyini
- Genus: Zulumyia; Lindner, 1952

Type species
- Zulumyia rugifrons Lindner, 1952

Genus of flies

Zulumyia is a genus of flies in the family Stratiomyidae.

== Species ==
- Zulumyia dissimilis (Brunetti, 1926)
- Zulumyia expansa James, 1957
- Zulumyia signifera James, 1957
