= Cyphoprosopa =

Scientific classification
- Kingdom: Animalia
- Phylum: Arthropoda
- Class: Insecta
- Order: Diptera
- Family: Stratiomyidae
- Subfamily: Stratiomyinae
- Tribe: Prosopochrysini
- Genus: Cyphoprosopa; James, 1975

Type species
- Cyphoprosopa lindneri James, 1975

Genus of flies

Cyphoprosopa is a genus of flies in the family Stratiomyidae.

== Species ==
- Cyphoprosopa lindneri James, 1975
