= Hoplistopsis =

Scientific classification
- Kingdom: Animalia
- Phylum: Arthropoda
- Class: Insecta
- Order: Diptera
- Family: Stratiomyidae
- Subfamily: Stratiomyinae
- Tribe: Prosopochrysini
- Genus: Hoplistopsis; James, 1950

Type species
- Hoplistopsis geminatus James, 1950

Genus of flies

Hoplistopsis is a genus of flies in the family Stratiomyidae.

== Species ==
- Hoplistopsis geminatus James, 1950
