= Rhaphiocerina =

Scientific classification
- Kingdom: Animalia
- Phylum: Arthropoda
- Class: Insecta
- Order: Diptera
- Family: Stratiomyidae
- Subfamily: Stratiomyinae
- Tribe: Prosopochrysini
- Genus: Rhaphiocerina; Lindner, 1936

Type species
- Rhaphiocerina hakiensis Matsumura, 1916

Synonyms
- Rhaphicerina Hua, 2006

Genus of flies

Rhaphiocerina is a genus of flies in the family Stratiomyidae.

== Species ==
- Rhaphiocerina chinensis Li, Yang & Zhang, 2016
- Rhaphiocerina hakiensis Matsumura, 1916
