= Anopisthocrania =

Scientific classification
- Kingdom: Animalia
- Phylum: Arthropoda
- Class: Insecta
- Order: Diptera
- Family: Stratiomyidae
- Subfamily: Stratiomyinae
- Tribe: Stratiomyini
- Genus: Anopisthocrania; Lindner, 1935

Type species
- Anopisthocrania zonata Lindner, 1935

Genus of flies

Anopisthocrania is a genus of flies in the family Stratiomyidae.

== Species ==
- Anopisthocrania zonata Lindner, 1935
