= Euparyphus brevicornis =

Scientific classification
- Kingdom: Animalia
- Phylum: Arthropoda
- Class: Insecta
- Order: Diptera
- Family: Stratiomyidae
- Tribe: Oxycerini
- Genus: Euparyphus
- Species: E. brevicornis

Binomial name
- Euparyphus brevicornis Loew, 1866

Synonyms
- Euparyphus brucensis Steyskal, 1951

Species of fly

Euparyphus brevicornis is a species of soldier fly in the family Stratiomyidae.

== Distribution ==
Canada, United States.
