= Exochostoma =

Scientific classification
- Kingdom: Animalia
- Phylum: Arthropoda
- Class: Insecta
- Order: Diptera
- Family: Stratiomyidae
- Subfamily: Stratiomyinae
- Tribe: Prosopochrysini
- Genus: Exochostoma; Macquart, 1842

Type species
- Exochostoma nitida Macquart, 1842

Synonyms
- Exchostoma Johnson, 1895; Exostoma Enderlein, 1914

Genus of flies

Exochostoma is a genus of flies in the family Stratiomyidae.

== Species ==
- Exochostoma nitidum Macquart, 1842
- Exochostoma ornatum Lindner, 1974
- Exochostoma osellai Mason, 1995
