= Anoplodonta =

Scientific classification
- Kingdom: Animalia
- Phylum: Arthropoda
- Class: Insecta
- Order: Diptera
- Family: Stratiomyidae
- Subfamily: Stratiomyinae
- Tribe: Stratiomyini
- Genus: Anoplodonta; James, 1936

Type species
- Odontomyia nigrirostris Loew, 1866

Genus of flies

Anoplodonta is a genus of soldier flies in the family Stratiomyidae.

== Species ==
- Anoplodonta fratella (Williston, 1900)
- Anoplodonta nigrirostris (Loew, 1866)
