= Euparyphus =

Scientific classification
- Kingdom: Animalia
- Phylum: Arthropoda
- Class: Insecta
- Order: Diptera
- Family: Stratiomyidae
- Subfamily: Stratiomyinae
- Tribe: Oxycerini
- Genus: Euparyphus; Gerstaecker, 1857

Type species
- Cyphomyia elegans (Wiedemann, 1830)

Genus of flies

Euparyphus is a genus of flies in the family Stratiomyidae.

== Species ==
- Euparyphus albipilosus Adams, 1903
- Euparyphus apicalis Coquillett, 1902
- Euparyphus arizonae James, 1973
- Euparyphus ater James, 1973
- Euparyphus bistriatus Williston, 1896
- Euparyphus brasiliensis Lindner, 1949
- Euparyphus brevicornis Loew, 1866
- Euparyphus carbonarius Giglio-Tos, 1891
- Euparyphus cataractus Quist, 1973
- Euparyphus cinctus Osten Sacken, 1886
- Euparyphus elegans (Wiedemann, 1830)
- Euparyphus elongatulus Williston, 1900
- Euparyphus facialis James, 1973
- Euparyphus hamifer James, 1940
- Euparyphus lagunae Cole, 1912
- Euparyphus limbrocutris Adams, 1903
- Euparyphus monensis James, 1973
- Euparyphus mutabilis Adams, 1903
- Euparyphus nebulosus James, 1973
- Euparyphus ornatus Williston, 1885
- Euparyphus pardalinus James, 1936
- Euparyphus patagius Quist, 1973
- Euparyphus peruvianus Lindner, 1941
- Euparyphus pygmaea James, 1973
- Euparyphus rothi James, 1973
- Euparyphus sabroskyi James, 1936
- Euparyphus stigmaticalis Loew, 1866
- Euparyphus tricolor Osten Sacken, 1886
- Euparyphus umbrulus Quist, 1973
