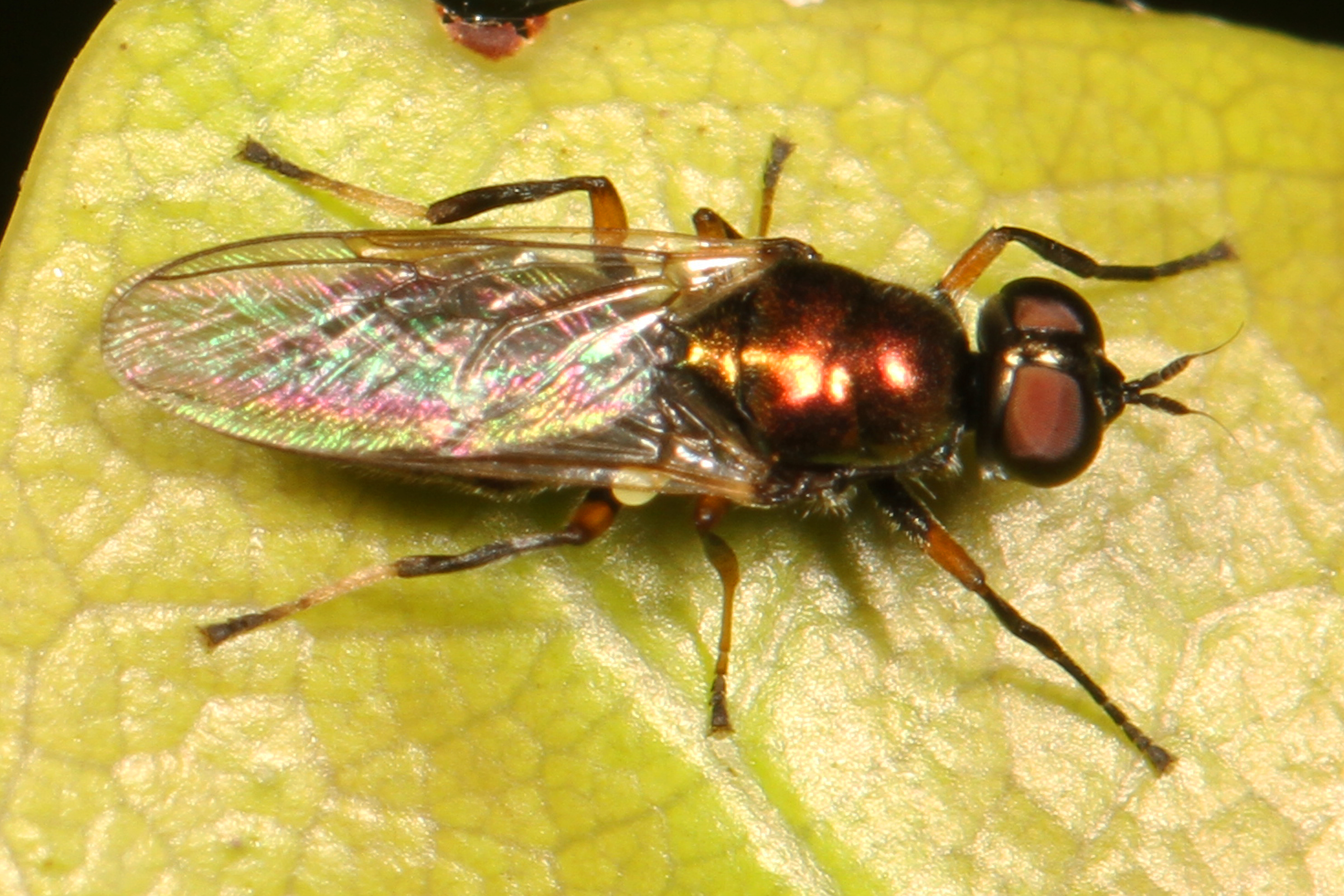
- Nothomyia calopus

Scientific classification
- Kingdom: Animalia
- Phylum: Arthropoda
- Class: Insecta
- Order: Diptera
- Family: Stratiomyidae
- Subfamily: Stratiomyinae
- Tribe: Prosopochrysini; Enderlein, 1914

= Prosopochrysini =

Tribe of flies

Prosopochrysini is a tribe of soldier flies in the family Stratiomyidae.

== Genera ==
- Acanthasargus White, 1914
- Brianmyia Woodley, 2012
- Cyphoprosopa James, 1975
- Exochostoma Macquart, 1842
- Hoplistopsis James, 1950
- Melanoichroa Brauer, 1882
- Myxosargus Brauer, 1882
- Nothomyia Loew, 1869
- Prosopochrysa Meijere, 1907
- Rhaphiocerina Lindner, 1936
