= Alliocera =

Scientific classification
- Kingdom: Animalia
- Phylum: Arthropoda
- Clade: Pancrustacea
- Class: Insecta
- Order: Diptera
- Family: Stratiomyidae
- Subfamily: Stratiomyinae
- Tribe: Stratiomyini
- Genus: Alliocera; Saunders, 1845

Type species
- Alliocera graeca Saunders, 1845

Synonyms
- Ailiocera Schiner, 1855

Genus of flies

Alliocera is a genus of flies in the family Stratiomyidae.

== Species ==
- Alliocera graeca Saunders, 1845
