= Promeranisa =

Scientific classification
- Kingdom: Animalia
- Phylum: Arthropoda
- Class: Insecta
- Order: Diptera
- Family: Stratiomyidae
- Subfamily: Stratiomyinae
- Tribe: Stratiomyini
- Genus: Promeranisa; Walker, 1854

Type species
- Promeranisa vittata Walker, 1854

Synonyms
- Promerisana Williston, 1888

Genus of flies

Promeranisa is a genus of flies in the family Stratiomyidae.

== Species ==
- Promeranisa cylindricornis Williston, 1888
- Promeranisa nasuta (Macquart, 1850)
- Promeranisa varipes James, 1979
- Promeranisa vittata Walker, 1856
