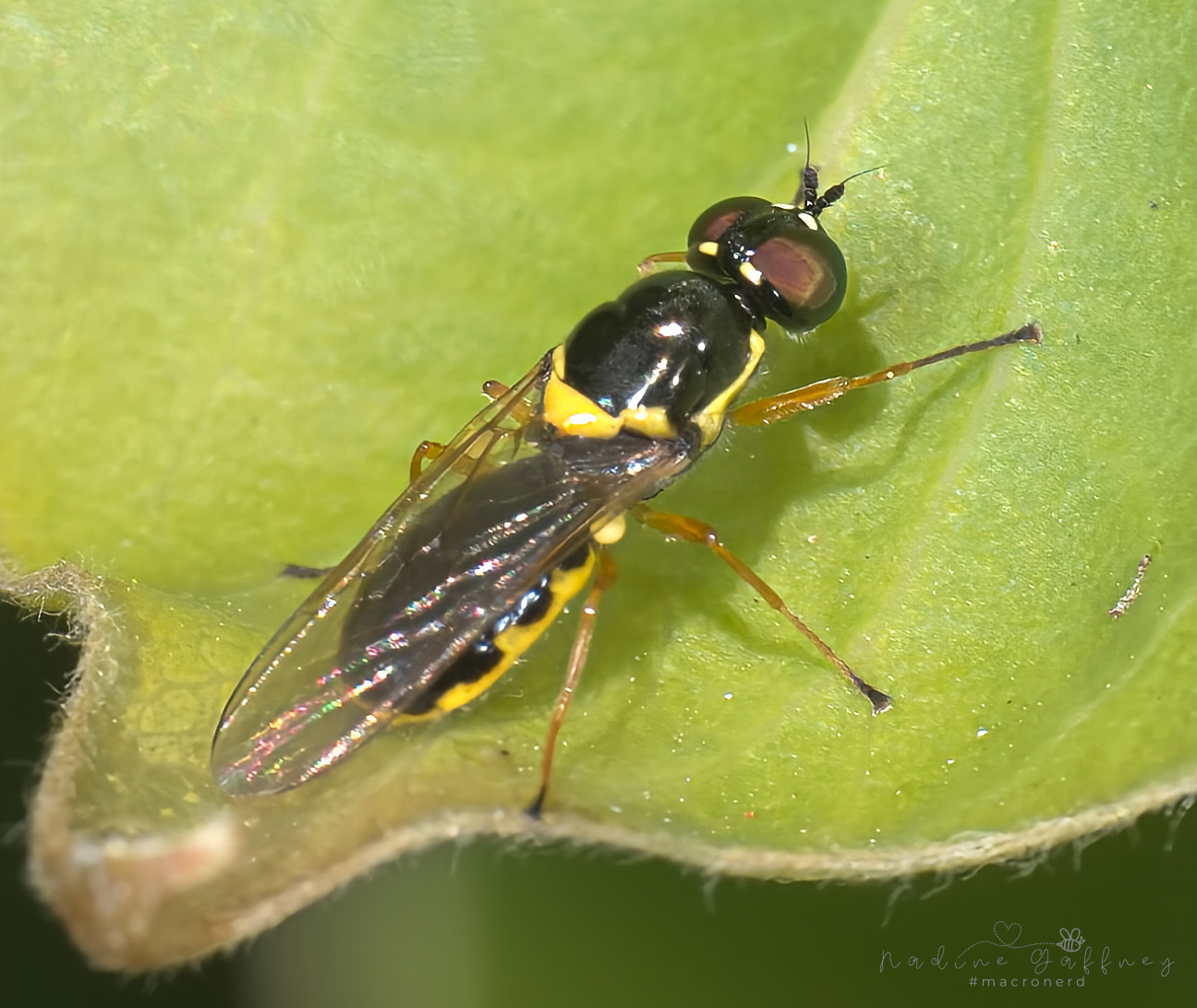
- Acanthasargus flavipes

Scientific classification
- Kingdom: Animalia
- Phylum: Arthropoda
- Clade: Pancrustacea
- Class: Insecta
- Order: Diptera
- Family: Stratiomyidae
- Subfamily: Stratiomyinae
- Tribe: Prosopochrysini
- Genus: Acanthasargus; White, 1914

Type species
- Acanthasargus palustris White, 1914

Synonyms
- Acanthosargus James, 1950; Timorimyia Frey, 1934

= Acanthasargus =

Genus of flies

Acanthasargus is a genus of flies in the family Stratiomyidae.

== Species ==
- Acanthasargus bidentatus (Frey, 1934)
- Acanthasargus flavipes Hardy, 1932
- Acanthasargus gracilis White, 1916
- Acanthasargus inflatus James, 1950
- Acanthasargus palustris White, 1914
- Acanthasargus varipes Hardy, 1932
