= Gongroneurina =

Scientific classification
- Kingdom: Animalia
- Phylum: Arthropoda
- Clade: Pancrustacea
- Class: Insecta
- Order: Diptera
- Family: Stratiomyidae
- Subfamily: Stratiomyinae
- Tribe: Stratiomyini
- Genus: Gongroneurina; Enderlein, 1934

Type species
- Gongroneura apidina Enderlein, 1914

Synonyms
- Gongroneura Enderlein, 1914

Genus of flies

Gongroneurina is a genus of flies in the family Stratiomyidae.

== Species ==
- Gongroneurina apidina (Enderlein, 1914)
