= Brianmyia =

Scientific classification
- Kingdom: Animalia
- Phylum: Arthropoda
- Class: Insecta
- Order: Diptera
- Family: Stratiomyidae
- Subfamily: Stratiomyinae
- Tribe: Prosopochrysini
- Genus: Brianmyia; Woodley, 2012

Type species
- Brianmyia stuckenbergi Woodley, 2012

Genus of flies

Brianmyia is a genus of flies in the family Stratiomyidae.

== Species ==
- Brianmyia stuckenbergi Woodley, 2012
