= Nyassamyia =

Scientific classification
- Kingdom: Animalia
- Phylum: Arthropoda
- Class: Insecta
- Order: Diptera
- Family: Stratiomyidae
- Subfamily: Stratiomyinae
- Tribe: Stratiomyini
- Genus: Nyassamyia; Lindner, 1980

Type species
- Nyassa andreniformis Lindner, 1935

Synonyms
- Nyassa Lindner, 1935

Genus of flies

Nyassamyia is a genus of flies in the family Stratiomyidae.

== Species ==
- Nyassamyia andreniformis (Lindner, 1935)
- Nyassamyia deceptor (Curran, 1928)
