= Melanoichroa =

Scientific classification
- Kingdom: Animalia
- Phylum: Arthropoda
- Class: Insecta
- Order: Diptera
- Family: Stratiomyidae
- Subfamily: Stratiomyinae
- Tribe: Prosopochrysini
- Genus: Melanoichroa; Brauer, 1882

Type species
- Melanoichroa dubia Brauer, 1882

Genus of flies

Melanoichroa is a genus of flies in the family Stratiomyidae.

== Species ==
- Melanoichroa dubia Brauer, 1882
