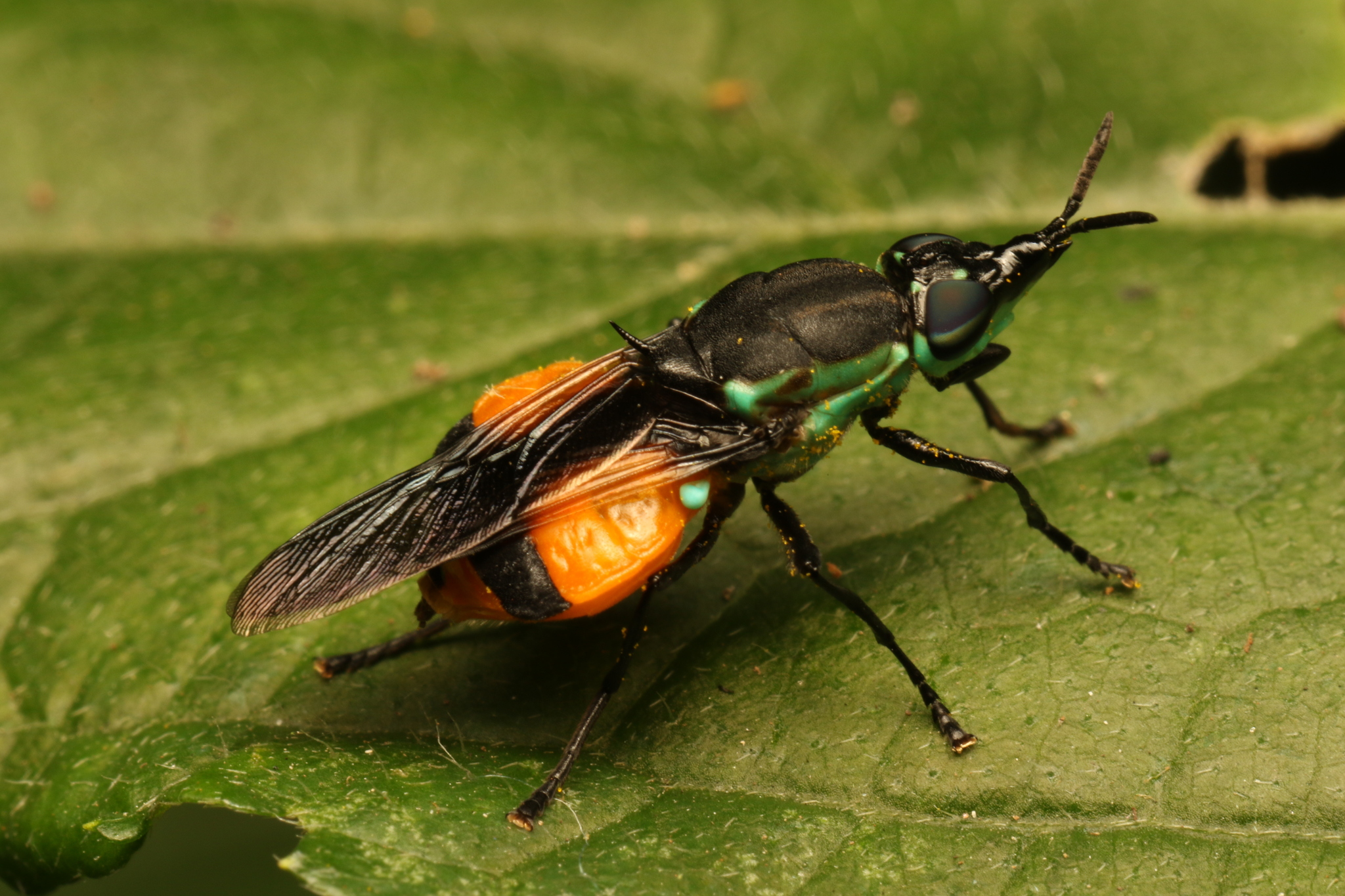
- Rhingiopsis tau

Scientific classification
- Kingdom: Animalia
- Phylum: Arthropoda
- Class: Insecta
- Order: Diptera
- Family: Stratiomyidae
- Subfamily: Stratiomyinae
- Tribe: Stratiomyini
- Genus: Rhingiopsis; Röder, 1886

Type species
- Rhingiopsis tau Röder, 1886

= Rhingiopsis =

Genus of flies

Rhingiopsis is a genus of flies in the family Stratiomyidae.

== Species ==
- Rhingiopsis enderleini Lindner, 1928
- Rhingiopsis jamesi Barretto, 1947
- Rhingiopsis lanei Barretto, 1947
- Rhingiopsis nasuta Enderlein, 1914
- Rhingiopsis priscula (Cockerell, 1910)
- Rhingiopsis rostrata (Wiedemann, 1830)
- Rhingiopsis tau Röder, 1886
