= Vanoyia =

Scientific classification
- Kingdom: Animalia
- Phylum: Arthropoda
- Class: Insecta
- Order: Diptera
- Family: Stratiomyidae
- Subfamily: Stratiomyinae
- Tribe: Oxycerini
- Genus: Vanoyia; Villeneuve, 1908

Type species
- Vanoyia scutellata Villeneuve, 1908

Synonyms
- Vanoyea Enderlein, 1914; Vanoyea Pleske, 1924; Vonoyea Enderlein, 1914

Genus of flies

Vanoyia is a genus of flies in the family Stratiomyidae.

== Species ==
- Vanoyia tenuicornis (Macquart, 1834)
