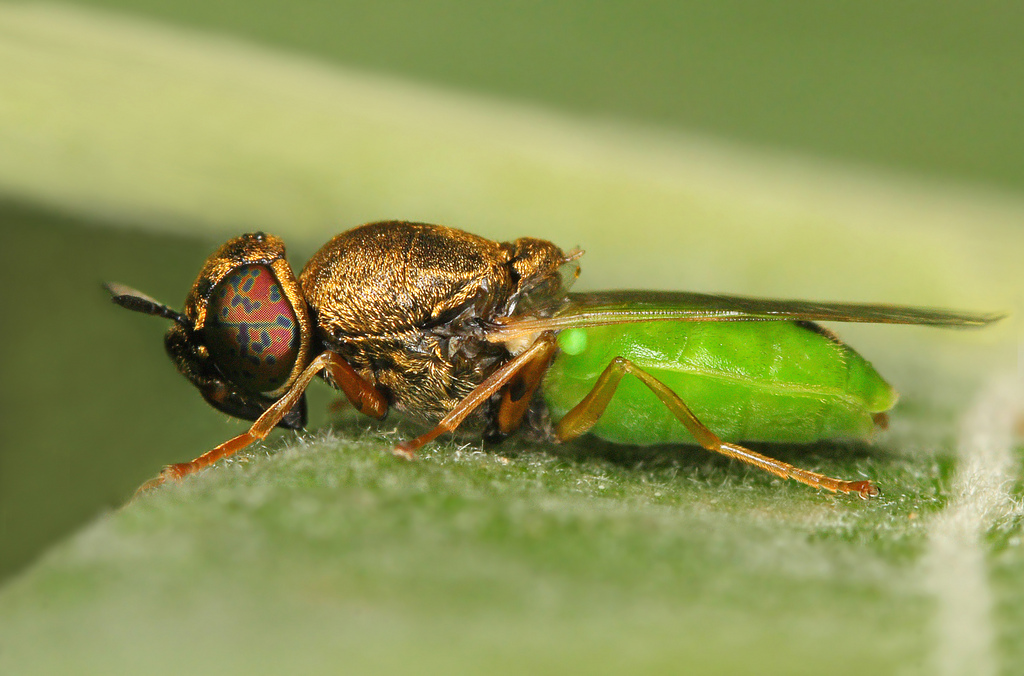
- Oplodontha viridula

Scientific classification
- Kingdom: Animalia
- Phylum: Arthropoda
- Clade: Pancrustacea
- Class: Insecta
- Order: Diptera
- Family: Stratiomyidae
- Subfamily: Stratiomyinae
- Tribe: Stratiomyini
- Genus: Oplodontha; Rondani, 1863

Synonyms
- Haplodonta Frey, 1934; Hoplodonta James, 1940; Hoplodonta Scudder, 1882; Oplodonta Brauer, 1882

= Oplodontha =

Genus of flies

Oplodontha is a genus of flies in the family Stratiomyidae.

== Species ==
- Oplodontha africana (Enderlein, 1917)
- Oplodontha albipennis (Macquart, 1838)
- Oplodontha anodonta (Macquart, 1846)
- Oplodontha circumscripta Bezzi, 1908
- Oplodontha decellei Lindner, 1965
- Oplodontha dispar (Macquart, 1838)
- Oplodontha elongata Zhang, Li & Yang, 2009
- Oplodontha facinigra Zhang, Li & Yang, 2009
- Oplodontha guerinii (Macquart, 1838)
- Oplodontha lindneri James, 1980
- Oplodontha luzonensis James, 1947
- Oplodontha minuta (Fabricius, 1794)
- Oplodontha pulchriceps (Loew, 1858)
- Oplodontha punctifacies (Brunetti, 1923)
- Oplodontha rubrithorax (Macquart, 1838)
- Oplodontha sinensis Zhang, Li & Yang, 2009
- Oplodontha viridula (Fabricius, 1775)
