= Pinaleus =

Scientific classification
- Kingdom: Animalia
- Phylum: Arthropoda
- Clade: Pancrustacea
- Class: Insecta
- Order: Diptera
- Family: Stratiomyidae
- Subfamily: Stratiomyinae
- Tribe: Stratiomyini
- Genus: Pinaleus; Bezzi, 1928

Type species
- Pinaleus bivittatus Bezzi, 1928

Genus of flies

Pinaleus is a genus of flies in the family Stratiomyidae.

== Species ==
- Pinaleus bivittatus Bezzi, 1928
- Pinaleus conformis Bezzi, 1928
- Pinaleus rostrifer Bezzi, 1928
