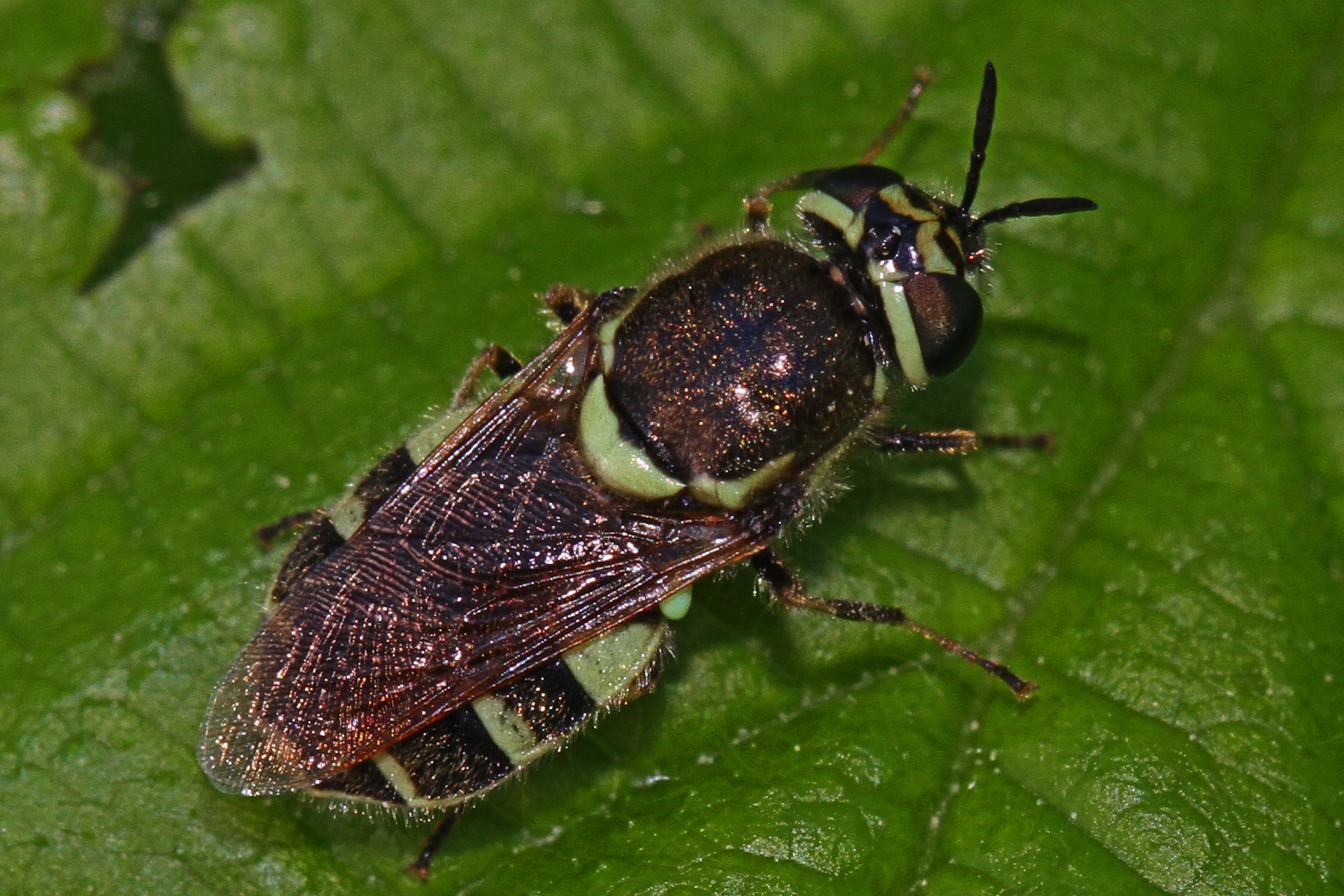
- Psellidotus hieroglyphicus

Scientific classification
- Kingdom: Animalia
- Phylum: Arthropoda
- Clade: Pancrustacea
- Class: Insecta
- Order: Diptera
- Family: Stratiomyidae
- Subfamily: Stratiomyinae
- Tribe: Stratiomyini
- Genus: Psellidotus; Rondani, 1863

Type species
- Odontomyia elegans Macquart, 1838

Synonyms
- Labostigmina Enderlein, 1930; Udamacantha Enderlein, 1914

= Psellidotus =

Genus of flies

Psellidotus is a genus of flies in the family Stratiomyidae.

== Species ==
- Psellidotus abditus (Lindner, 1949)
- Psellidotus annamariae (Brimley, 1925)
- Psellidotus atrifacies (James, 1970)
- Psellidotus atriventris (James, 1979)
- Psellidotus auripes (James, 1979)
- Psellidotus aztecanus (James, 1979)
- Psellidotus bonariensis (Brèthes, 1922)
- Psellidotus caloceps (Bigot, 1879)
- Psellidotus comma (Williston, 1900)
- Psellidotus concinnatus (Williston, 1900)
- Psellidotus dasyops (James, 1979)
- Psellidotus defectus (James, 1952)
- Psellidotus elegans (Macquart, 1838)
- Psellidotus fascifrons (Macquart, 1850)
- Psellidotus fenestratus (Thomson, 1869)
- Psellidotus flavicornis (Olivier, 1811)
- Psellidotus formosus (James, 1979)
- Psellidotus fulvicornis (Curran, 1927)
- Psellidotus gagatigaster (Steyskal, 1949)
- Psellidotus goniophorus (Say, 1829)
- Psellidotus hieroglyphicus (Olivier, 1811)
- Psellidotus hypomelas (James, 1952)
- Psellidotus inermis (Wiedemann, 1830)
- Psellidotus inflatus (James, 1979)
- Psellidotus lucens (James, 1979)
- Psellidotus macalpini (James, 1979)
- Psellidotus maculifrons (Walker, 1849)
- Psellidotus meganticus (Curran, 1925)
- Psellidotus micheneri (James, 1952)
- Psellidotus nasifer (James, 1979)
- Psellidotus novellus (Steyskal, 1938)
- Psellidotus obscurus (Olivier, 1811)
- Psellidotus occipitalis (Johnson, 1895)
- Psellidotus panamensis (James, 1979)
- Psellidotus pictifrons (James, 1979)
- Psellidotus pictus (James, 1979)
- Psellidotus protrudens (James, 1939)
- Psellidotus robustus (James, 1979)
- Psellidotus rubricornis (Macquart, 1846)
- Psellidotus rufipennis (James, 1952)
- Psellidotus similis (Johnson, 1895)
- Psellidotus snowi (Hart, 1896)
- Psellidotus stonei (James, 1977)
- Psellidotus texasianus (Johnson, 1895)
- Psellidotus viridis (Bellardi, 1859)
