= Stratiomyella =

Scientific classification
- Kingdom: Animalia
- Phylum: Arthropoda
- Class: Insecta
- Order: Diptera
- Family: Stratiomyidae
- Subfamily: Stratiomyinae
- Tribe: Stratiomyini
- Genus: Stratiomyella; James, 1953

Type species
- Stratiomyella nana James, 1953

Genus of flies

Stratiomyella is a genus of flies in the family Stratiomyidae.

== Species ==
- Stratiomyella nana James, 1953
