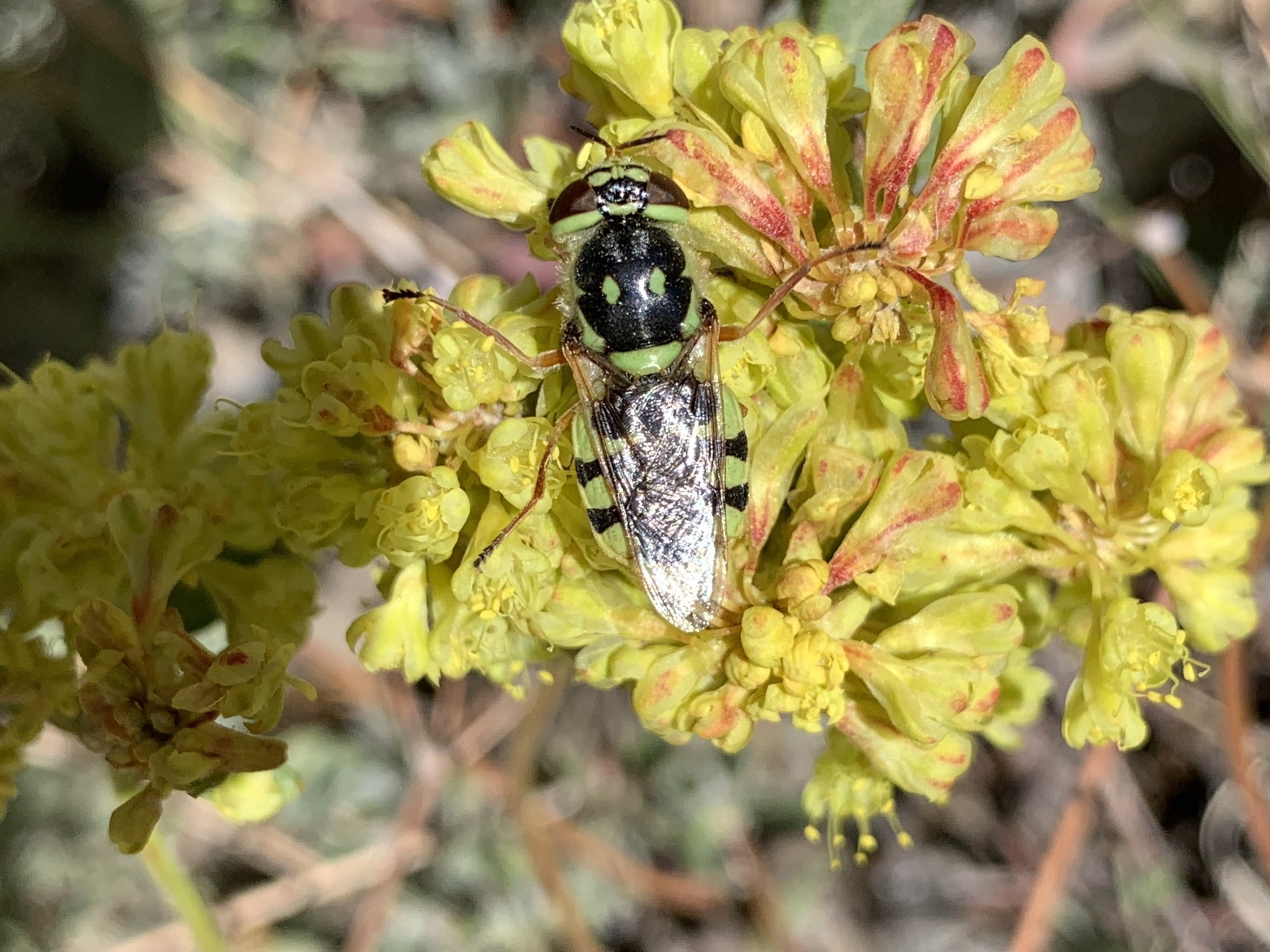
- Hedriodiscus binotatus

Scientific classification
- Kingdom: Animalia
- Phylum: Arthropoda
- Clade: Pancrustacea
- Class: Insecta
- Order: Diptera
- Family: Stratiomyidae
- Subfamily: Stratiomyinae
- Tribe: Stratiomyini
- Genus: Hedriodiscus; Enderlein, 1914

Type species
- Odontomyia brevifacies

Synonyms
- Hedriodiscina Enderlein, 1914

= Hedriodiscus =

Genus of flies

Hedriodiscus is a genus of flies in the family Stratiomyidae.

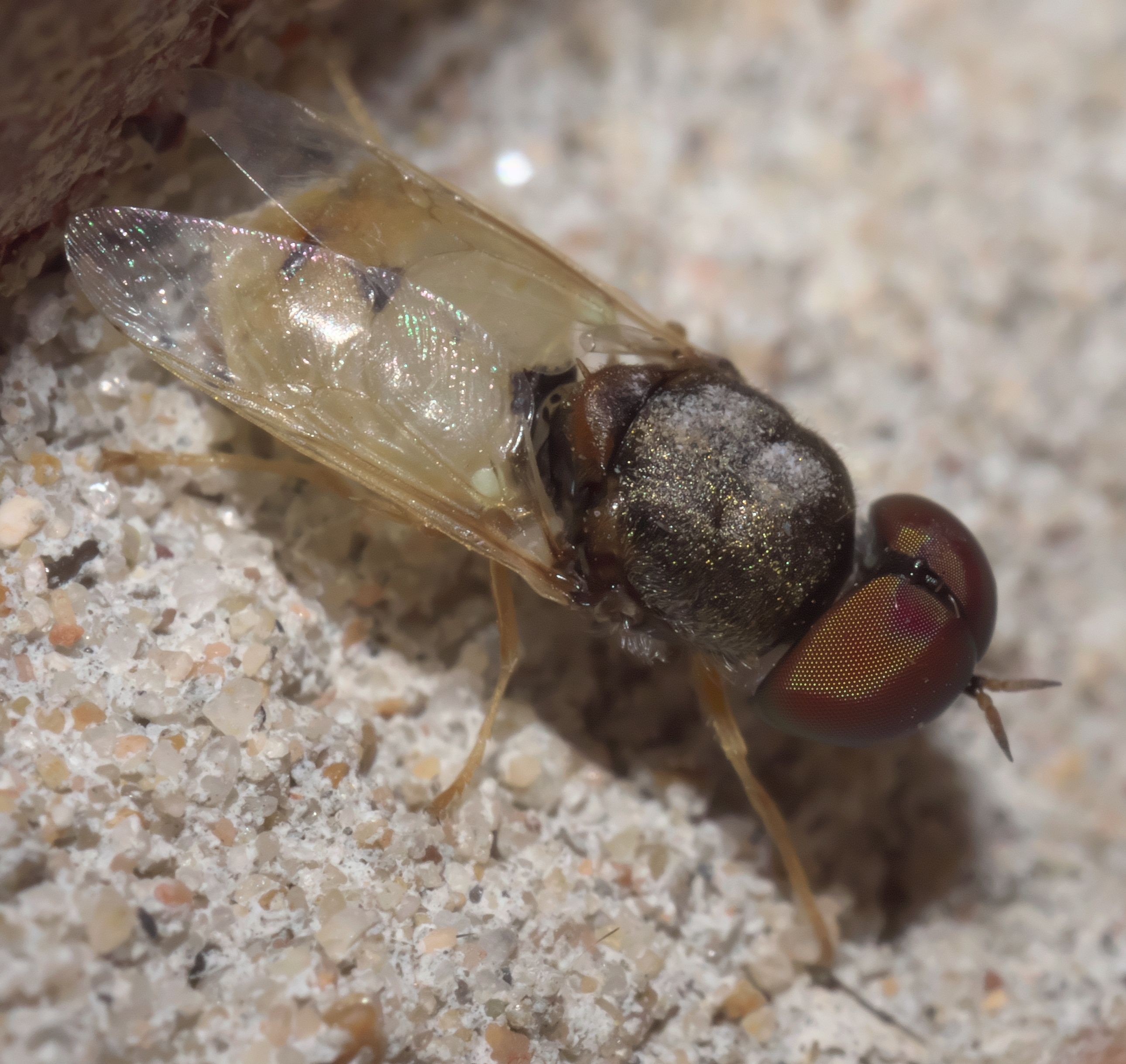

== Species ==
- Hedriodiscus binotatus (Loew, 1866)
- Hedriodiscus chloraspis (Wiedemann, 1830)
- Hedriodiscus clypeatus (Bigot, 1879)
- Hedriodiscus dorsalis (Fabricius, 1805)
- Hedriodiscus euchlorus (Gerstaecker, 1857)
- Hedriodiscus humilis (Lindner, 1929)
- Hedriodiscus hydrolupus (Lindner, 1949)
- Hedriodiscus infrapallidus (Lindner, 1951)
- Hedriodiscus jacarellus (Lindner, 1949)
- Hedriodiscus lefebvrei (Macquart, 1838)
- Hedriodiscus leucogaster (James, 1933)
- Hedriodiscus lineatus (Fabricius, 1805)
- Hedriodiscus nudifrons James, 1953
- Hedriodiscus pallidiventris (Macquart, 1846)
- Hedriodiscus prasinus (Jaennicke, 1867)
- Hedriodiscus pulcher (Wiedemann, 1824)
- Hedriodiscus punctifer (Bigot, 1879)
- Hedriodiscus quadrilineatus (Macquart, 1834)
- Hedriodiscus subcupratus (Walker, 1854)
- Hedriodiscus superpictus (Lindner, 1949)
- Hedriodiscus tortugellus (Lindner, 1949)
- Hedriodiscus trivittatus (Say, 1829)
- Hedriodiscus truquii (Bellardi, 1859)
- Hedriodiscus turacellus (Lindner, 1949)
- Hedriodiscus varipes (Loew, 1866)
- Hedriodiscus vertebratus (Say, 1824)
