= Catatasis =

Scientific classification
- Kingdom: Animalia
- Phylum: Arthropoda
- Class: Insecta
- Order: Diptera
- Family: Stratiomyidae
- Subfamily: Stratiomyinae
- Tribe: Stratiomyini
- Genus: Catatasis; Kertész, 1912

Type species
- Catatasis clypeata Kertész, 1912

Genus of flies

Catatasis is a genus of flies in the family Stratiomyidae.

== Species ==
- Catatasis clypeata Kertész, 1912
- Catatasis congoensis Lindner, 1955
