= Prosopochrysa =

Scientific classification
- Kingdom: Animalia
- Phylum: Arthropoda
- Class: Insecta
- Order: Diptera
- Family: Stratiomyidae
- Subfamily: Stratiomyinae
- Tribe: Prosopochrysini
- Genus: Prosopochrysa; Meijere, 1907

Type species
- Chrysochlora vitripennis Doleschall, 1856

Synonyms
- Procoschrysa Ôuchi, 1940; Prosochrysa Ôuchi, 1940; Prosophochrysa James, 1975

Genus of flies

Prosopochrysa is a genus of flies in the family Stratiomyidae.

== Species ==
- Prosopochrysa azurea (Lindner, 1951)
- Prosopochrysa chusanensis Ôuchi, 1938
- Prosopochrysa lemannae Woodley & Lessard, 2019
- Prosopochrysa sinensis Lindner, 1940
- Prosopochrysa vitripennis (Doleschall, 1856)
