= Caloparyphus mariposa =

Scientific classification
- Kingdom: Animalia
- Phylum: Arthropoda
- Class: Insecta
- Order: Diptera
- Family: Stratiomyidae
- Tribe: Oxycerini
- Genus: Caloparyphus
- Species: C. mariposa

Binomial name
- Caloparyphus mariposa (James, 1939)

Synonyms
- Euparyphus mariposa James, 1939

Species of fly

Caloparyphus mariposa is a species of soldier fly in the family Stratiomyidae.

== Distribution ==
Canada, United States.
