= Dischizocera =

- Dischizocera zumpti

Scientific classification
- Kingdom: Animalia
- Phylum: Arthropoda
- Clade: Pancrustacea
- Class: Insecta
- Order: Diptera
- Family: Stratiomyidae
- Subfamily: Stratiomyinae
- Tribe: Stratiomyini
- Genus: Dischizocera; James, 1957

Type species
- Dischizocera zumpti Lindner, 1952

Genus of flies

Dischizocera is a genus of flies in the family Stratiomyidae.

== Species ==
- Dischizocera brunneinervis James, 1957
- Dischizocera huzuana Lindner, 1965
- Dischizocera nigronotum James, 1957
- Dischizocera vasta Lindner, 1952
- Dischizocera zumpti Lindner, 1952
