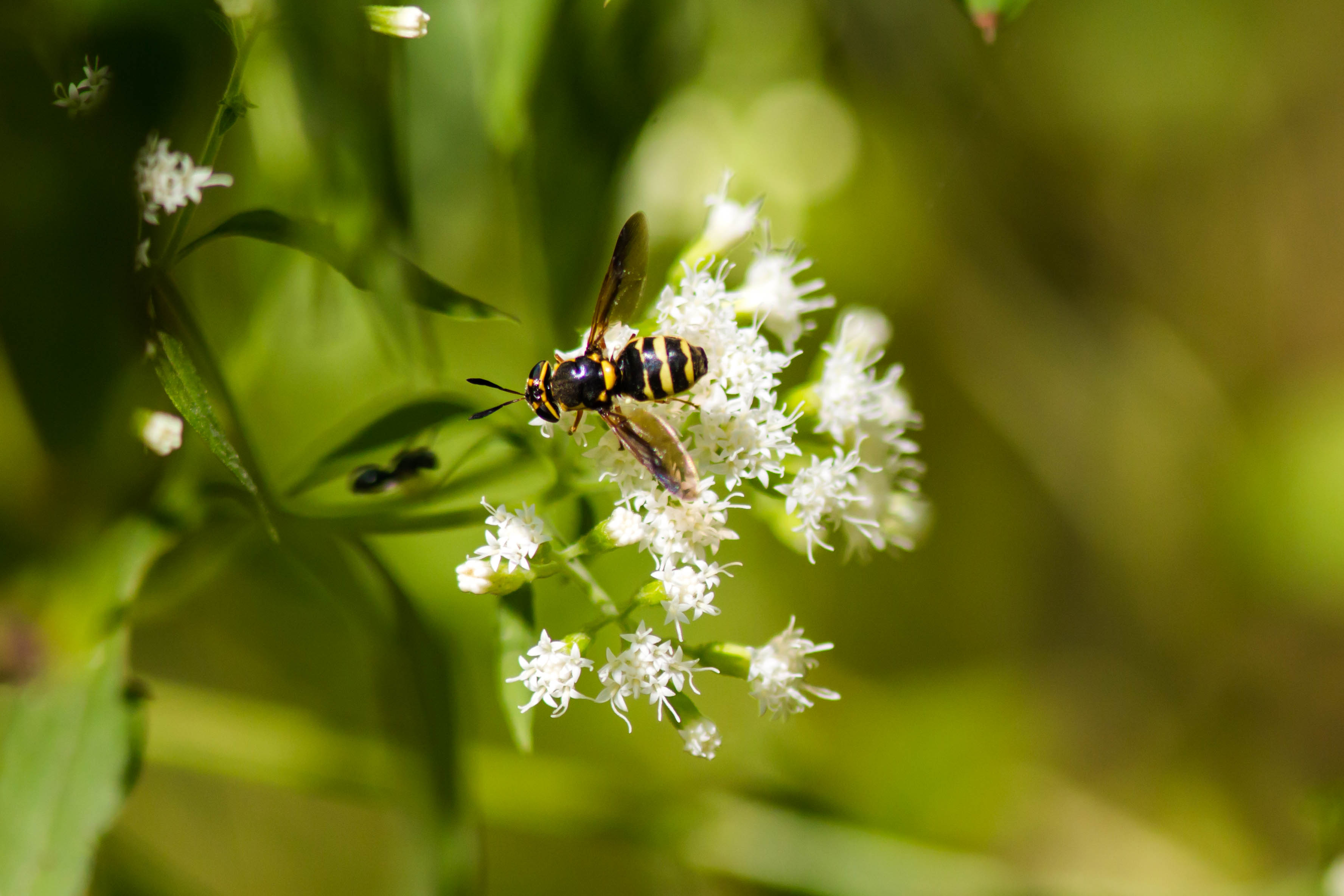
- Hoplitimyia constans

Scientific classification
- Kingdom: Animalia
- Phylum: Arthropoda
- Class: Insecta
- Order: Diptera
- Family: Stratiomyidae
- Subfamily: Stratiomyinae
- Tribe: Stratiomyini
- Genus: Hoplitimyia; James, 1934

Type species
- Stratiomys constans Loew, 1872

Synonyms
- Himantomyia James, 1939

= Hoplitimyia =

Genus of flies

Hoplitimyia is a genus of flies in the family Stratiomyidae.

== Species ==
- Hoplitimyia aleus (Walker, 1849)
- Hoplitimyia bellardii Woodley, 2001
- Hoplitimyia clavata James, 1939
- Hoplitimyia constans (Loew, 1872)
- Hoplitimyia costalis (Walker, 1836)
- Hoplitimyia inbioensis Woodley, 2008
- Hoplitimyia mutabilis (Fabricius, 1787)
- Hoplitimyia panamensis James, 1979
- Hoplitimyia semiluna James, 1939
- Hoplitimyia taurina James, 1979
