= Chloromelas =

Scientific classification
- Kingdom: Animalia
- Phylum: Arthropoda
- Class: Insecta
- Order: Diptera
- Family: Stratiomyidae
- Subfamily: Stratiomyinae
- Tribe: Stratiomyini
- Genus: Chloromelas; Enderlein, 1914

Type species
- Odontomyia heteronevra Macquart, 1838

Genus of flies

Chloromelas is a genus of flies in the family Stratiomyidae.

== Species ==
- Chloromelas barbata Lindner, 1935
- Chloromelas brunneipicta James, 1953
- Chloromelas coati Lindner, 1951
- Chloromelas cordobaensis (Lindner, 1951)
- Chloromelas cuprina (Wiedemann, 1830)
- Chloromelas virgata Lindner, 1969
