= Caloparyphus =

Scientific classification
- Kingdom: Animalia
- Phylum: Arthropoda
- Clade: Pancrustacea
- Class: Insecta
- Order: Diptera
- Family: Stratiomyidae
- Subfamily: Stratiomyinae
- Tribe: Oxycerini
- Genus: Caloparyphus; James, 1939

Type species
- Oxycera crotchi Osten Sacken, 1877

Synonyms
- Caloparypus James, 1973

Genus of flies

Caloparyphus is a genus of flies in the family Stratiomyidae.

== Species ==
- Caloparyphus amplus (Coquillett, 1902)
- Caloparyphus atriventris (Coquillett, 1902)
- Caloparyphus crotchi (Osten Sacken, 1877)
- Caloparyphus crucigerus (Coquillett, 1902)
- Caloparyphus currani (James, 1939)
- Caloparyphus decemmaculatus (Osten Sacken, 1886)
- Caloparyphus flaviventris (James, 1936)
- Caloparyphus greylockensis (Johnson, 1912)
- Caloparyphus major (Hine, 1901)
- Caloparyphus mariposa (James, 1939)
- Caloparyphus palaearcticus Rozkošný, Hauser & Gelhaus, 2016
- Caloparyphus pretiosus (Banks, 1920)
- Caloparyphus tetraspilus (Loew, 1866)
