= Zuerchermyia =

Scientific classification
- Kingdom: Animalia
- Phylum: Arthropoda
- Class: Insecta
- Order: Diptera
- Family: Stratiomyidae
- Subfamily: Stratiomyinae
- Tribe: Stratiomyini
- Genus: Zuerchermyia; Woodley, 2001

Type species
- Zuercheria malachitis Lindner, 1928

Synonyms
- Zuercheria Lindner, 1928

Genus of flies

Zuerchermyia is a genus of flies in the family Stratiomyidae.

== Species ==
- Zuerchermyia bequaerti (Curran, 1932)
- Zuerchermyia festiva (Walker, 1854)
- Zuerchermyia malachitis (Lindner, 1928)
- Zuerchermyia princeps (Gerstaecker, 1857)
- Zuerchermyia pustulosa (James, 1938)
