= Afrodontomyia =

Scientific classification
- Kingdom: Animalia
- Phylum: Arthropoda
- Class: Insecta
- Order: Diptera
- Family: Stratiomyidae
- Subfamily: Stratiomyinae
- Tribe: Stratiomyini
- Genus: Afrodontomyia; James, 1940

Type species
- Odontomyia seminuda Curran, 1928

Genus of flies

Afrodontomyia is a genus of flies in the family Stratiomyidae.

== Species ==
- Afrodontomyia apicalis James, 1952
- Afrodontomyia erecta (Brunetti, 1926)
- Afrodontomyia flammiventris (Brunetti, 1926)
- Afrodontomyia gigas (Brunetti, 1926)
- Afrodontomyia gracilis (Curran, 1928)
- Afrodontomyia rufiventris (Curran, 1928)
- Afrodontomyia rufoabdominalis (Brunetti, 1913)
- Afrodontomyia seminuda (Curran, 1928)
- Afrodontomyia titan James, 1952
