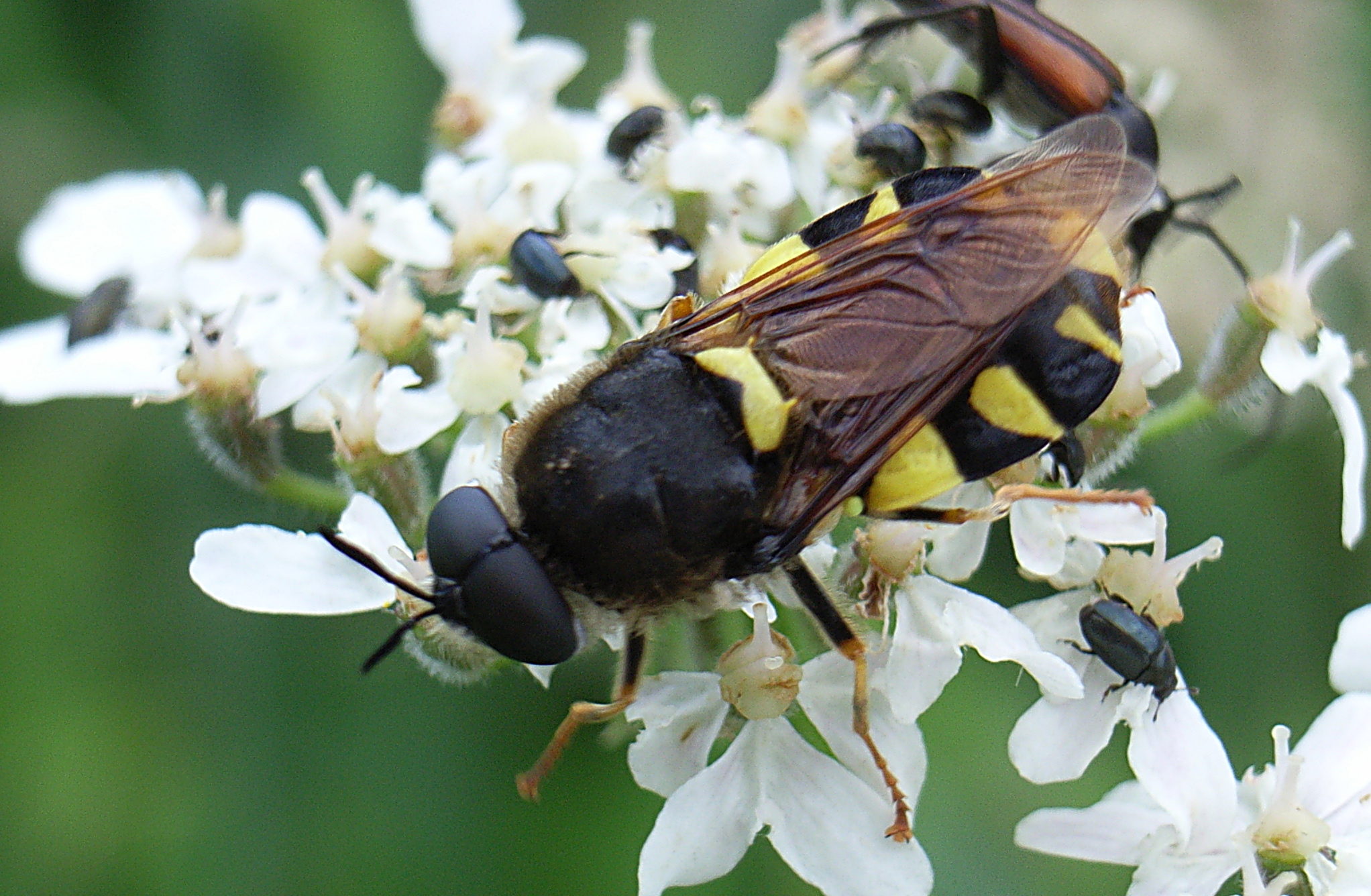
- Stratiomys chamaeleon

Scientific classification
- Kingdom: Animalia
- Phylum: Arthropoda
- Clade: Pancrustacea
- Class: Insecta
- Order: Diptera
- Family: Stratiomyidae
- Subfamily: Stratiomyinae
- Tribe: Stratiomyini; Latrielle, 1802

= Stratiomyini =

Tribe of flies

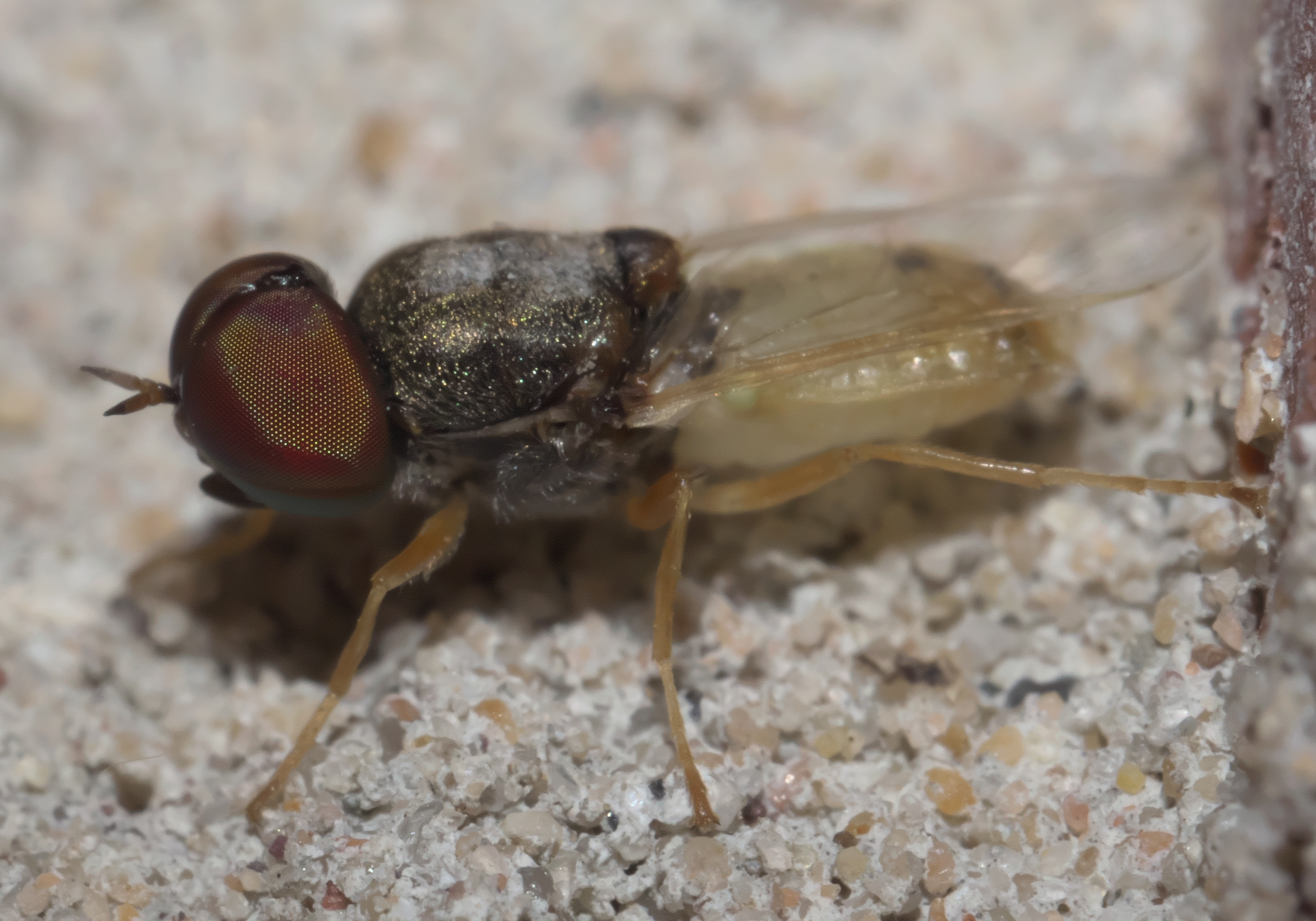
Hedriodiscus

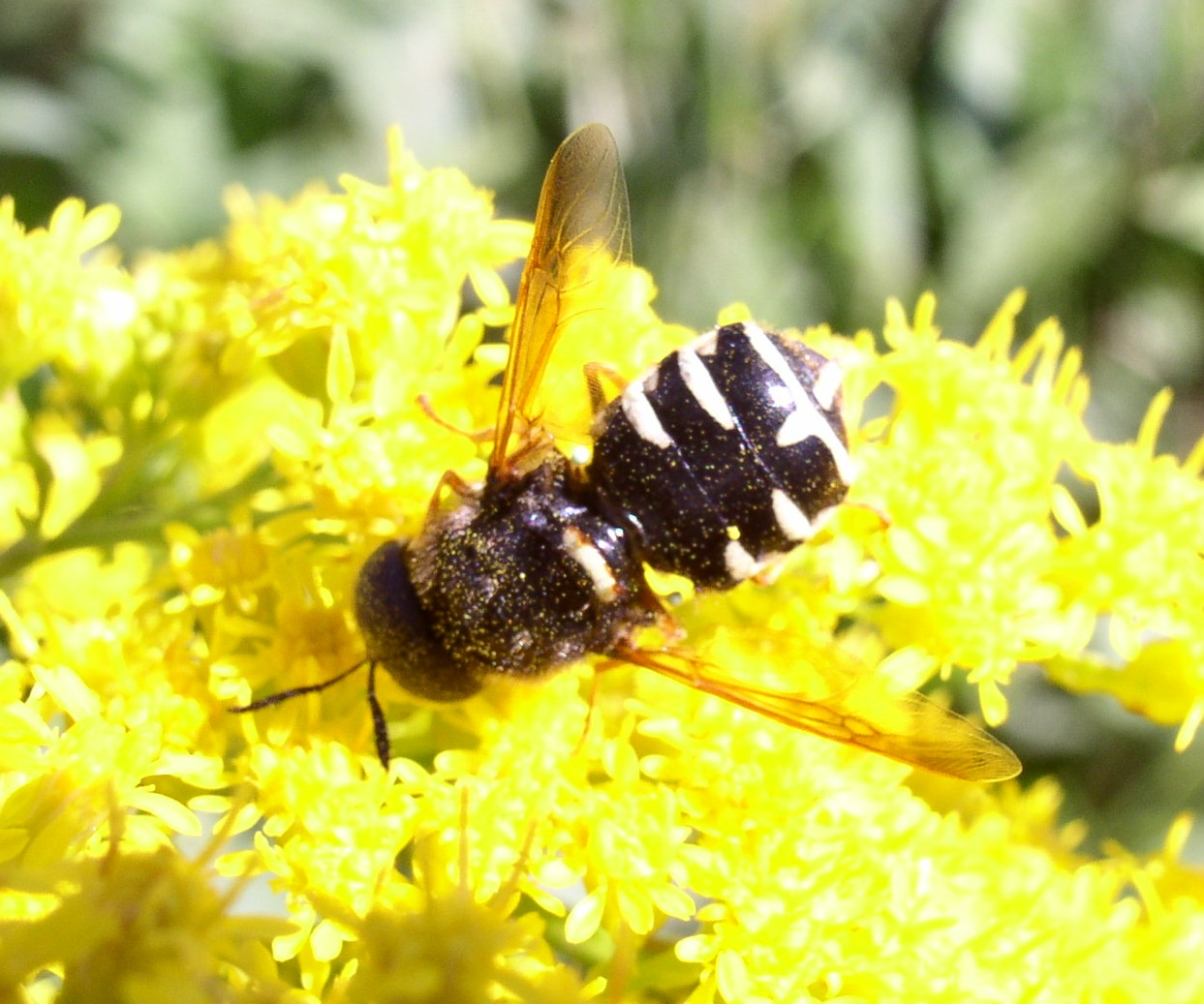
Stratiomys normula

Stratiomyini is a tribe of flies in the family Stratiomyidae.

== Genera ==
- Afrodontomyia James, 1940
- Alliocera Saunders, 1845
- Anopisthocrania Lindner, 1935
- Anoplodonta James, 1936
- Catatasis Kertész, 1912
- Chloromelas Enderlein, 1914
- Crocutasis Lindner, 1935
- Dischizocera James, 1957
- Gongroneurina Enderlein, 1933
- Hedriodiscus Enderlein, 1914
- Hoplitimyia James, 1934
- Metabasis Walker, 1851
- Nyassamyia Lindner, 1980
- Odontomyia Meigen, 1803
- Oplodontha Rondani, 1863
- Pinaleus Bezzi, 1928
- Promeranisa Walker, 1854
- Psellidotus Rondani, 1864
- Rhingiopsis Röder, 1886
- Scapanocnema Enderlein, 1914
- Stratiomyella James, 1953
- Stratiomys Geoffroy, 1762
- Systegnum Enderlein, 1917
- Zuerchermyia Woodley, 2001
- Zulumyia Lindner, 1952
