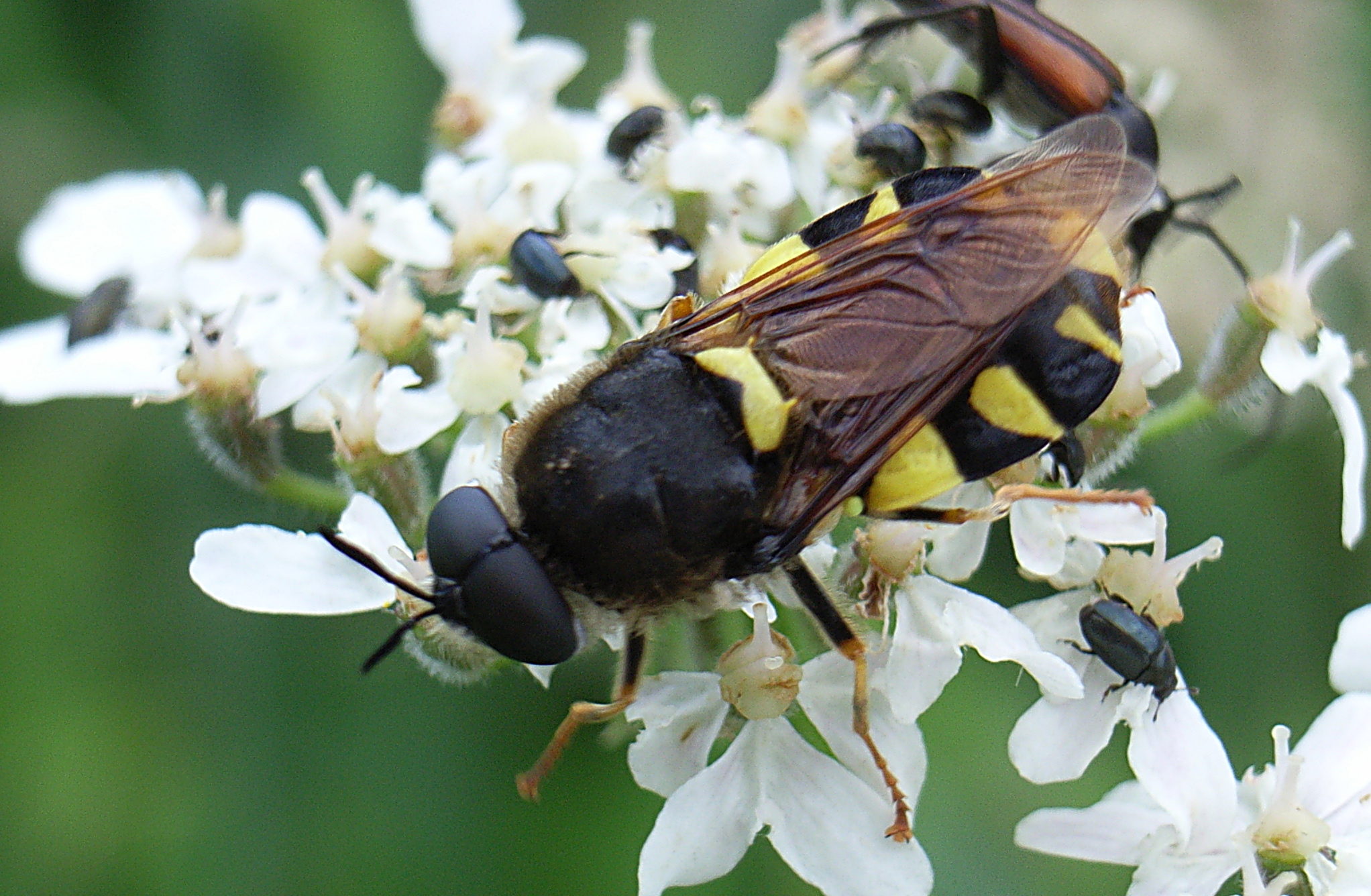
- Stratiomys chamaeleon

Scientific classification
- Kingdom: Animalia
- Phylum: Arthropoda
- Clade: Pancrustacea
- Class: Insecta
- Order: Diptera
- Family: Stratiomyidae
- Subfamily: Stratiomyinae; Latreille, 1802

Tribes
- Oxycerini; Prosopochrysini; Stratiomyini

= Stratiomyinae =

Subfamily of flies

Stratiomyinae is a subfamily of flies in the family Stratiomyidae.

== Genera ==
- Tribe Oxycerini
  - Caloparyphus James, 1939
  - Euparyphus Gerstaecker, 1857
  - Oxycera Meigen, 1803
  - Oxycerina Rozkošný & Woodley, 2010
  - Vanoyia Villeneuve, 1908
- Tribe Prosopochrysini
  - Acanthasargus White, 1914
  - Brianmyia Woodley, 2012
  - Cyphoprosopa James, 1975
  - Exochostoma Macquart, 1842
  - Hoplistopsis James, 1950
  - Melanoichroa Brauer, 1882
  - Myxosargus Brauer, 1882
  - Nothomyia Loew, 1869
  - Prosopochrysa Meijere, 1907
  - Rhaphiocerina Lindner, 1936
- Tribe Stratiomyini
  - Afrodontomyia James, 1940
  - Alliocera Saunders, 1845
  - Anopisthocrania Lindner, 1935
  - Anoplodonta James, 1936
  - Catatasis Kertész, 1912
  - Chloromelas Enderlein, 1914
  - Crocutasis Lindner, 1935
  - Dischizocera James, 1957
  - Gongroneurina Enderlein, 1933
  - Hedriodiscus Enderlein, 1914
  - Hoplitimyia James, 1934
  - Metabasis Walker, 1851
  - Nyassamyia Lindner, 1980
  - Odontomyia Meigen, 1803
  - Oplodontha Rondani, 1863
  - Pinaleus Bezzi, 1928
  - Promeranisa Walker, 1854
  - Psellidotus Rondani, 1864
  - Rhingiopsis Röder, 1886
  - Scapanocnema Enderlein, 1914
  - Stratiomyella James, 1953
  - Stratiomys Geoffroy, 1762
  - Systegnum Enderlein, 1917
  - Zuerchermyia Woodley, 2001
  - Zulumyia Lindner, 1952
