= Charterhouse =

Charterhouse may refer to:

- Charterhouse (monastery), of the Carthusian religious order

Charterhouse may also refer to:

== Places ==
- The Charterhouse, Coventry, a former monastery
- Charterhouse School, an English private school in Surrey

=== London locations ===
- London Charterhouse, London, England, an historic complex of buildings that originally housed a monastery, now the location of such sites as The Charterhouse Hospital
- Charterhouse Square, London, England

=== Municipalities ===
- Charterhouse, Somerset, also Charterhouse-on-Mendip, a hamlet in the Mendip Hills, England
- Charterhouse Roman Town, a town in the Roman province of Britannia, located close to Charterhouse-on-Mendip
- Hinton Charterhouse, a village in Somerset, England

=== Sites of scientific interest ===
- Charterhouse to Eashing, in Surrey, England
- Hinton Charterhouse Field, in Somerset, England
- Hinton Charterhouse Pit, in Somerset, England

== Financial institutions ==
- Charterhouse Bank, a UK-based investment bank
- Charterhouse Capital Partners, a UK-based private equity firm
- Charterhouse Group, a US-based private equity firm

== Other uses ==
- Shepshed Dynamo F.C., an Association Football club known from 1975 to 1992 as Shepshed Charterhouse

== See also ==
- Certosa (disambiguation), the Italian name for a Carthusian monastery
- Chartreuse (disambiguation), the French name for a Carthusian monastery
- The Charterhouse of Parma, an 1839 novel by Stendhal
- The Charterhouse Suite, see List of compositions by Ralph Vaughan Williams
