= Stratiomys barbata =

Scientific classification
- Kingdom: Animalia
- Phylum: Arthropoda
- Class: Insecta
- Order: Diptera
- Family: Stratiomyidae
- Subfamily: Stratiomyinae
- Tribe: Stratiomyini
- Genus: Stratiomys
- Species: S. barbata

Binomial name
- Stratiomys barbata (Loew, 1866)

Synonyms
- Stratiomyia atra Cole, 1919; Stratiomyia barbata Loew, 1866; Stratiomys calopus Bigot, 1887

Species of fly

Stratiomys barbata is a species of soldier fly in the family Stratiomyidae.

== Distribution ==
Canada, United States.
