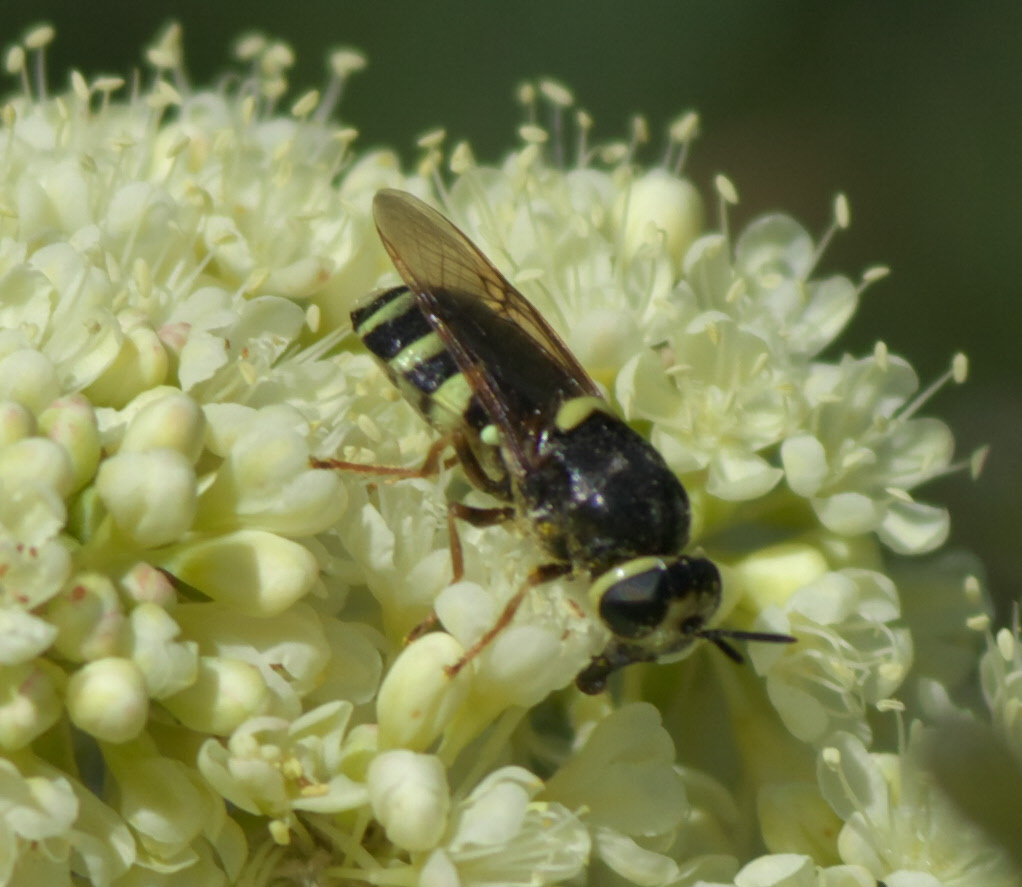

Scientific classification
- Kingdom: Animalia
- Phylum: Arthropoda
- Class: Insecta
- Order: Diptera
- Family: Stratiomyidae
- Subfamily: Stratiomyinae
- Tribe: Stratiomyini
- Genus: Stratiomys
- Species: S. laticeps

Binomial name
- Stratiomys laticeps (Loew, 1866)

Synonyms
- Stratiomyia laticeps Loew, 1866; Stratiomyia occidentis Banks, 1926

= Stratiomys laticeps =

Species of fly

Stratiomys laticeps is a species of soldier fly in the family Stratiomyidae.

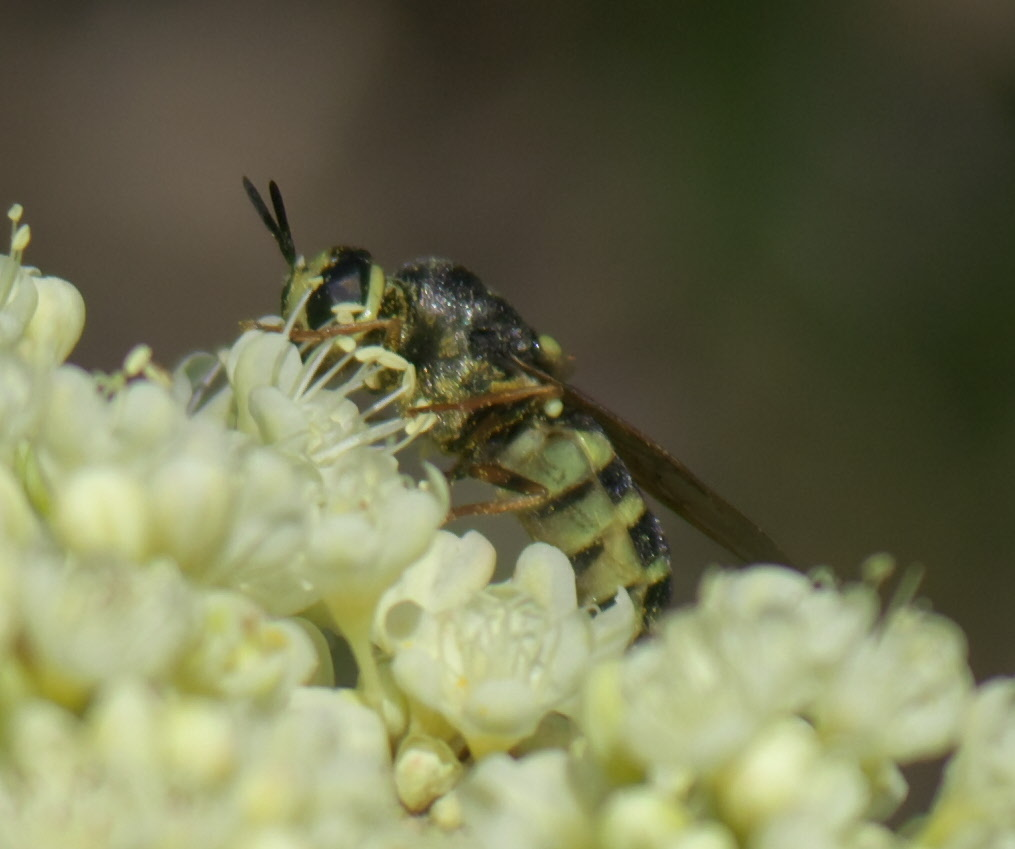

== Distribution ==
Canada, United States.
