= Stratiomys melastoma =

Scientific classification
- Kingdom: Animalia
- Phylum: Arthropoda
- Class: Insecta
- Order: Diptera
- Family: Stratiomyidae
- Subfamily: Stratiomyinae
- Tribe: Stratiomyini
- Genus: Stratiomys
- Species: S. melastoma

Binomial name
- Stratiomys melastoma (Loew, 1866)

Synonyms
- Stratiomyia melastoma Loew, 1866; Stratiomyia melanostoma Kertész, 1908

Species of fly

Stratiomys melastoma is a species of soldier fly in the family Stratiomyidae.

== Distribution ==
Canada, United States.
