= Stratiomys obesa =

Scientific classification
- Kingdom: Animalia
- Phylum: Arthropoda
- Class: Insecta
- Order: Diptera
- Family: Stratiomyidae
- Subfamily: Stratiomyinae
- Tribe: Stratiomyini
- Genus: Stratiomys
- Species: S. obesa

Binomial name
- Stratiomys obesa (Loew, 1866

Species of fly

Stratiomys obesa is a species of soldier fly in the family Stratiomyidae.

== Distribution ==
Stratiomys obesa can be found in Canada and the United States.
