= Stratiomys norma =

Scientific classification
- Kingdom: Animalia
- Phylum: Arthropoda
- Class: Insecta
- Order: Diptera
- Family: Stratiomyidae
- Subfamily: Stratiomyinae
- Tribe: Stratiomyini
- Genus: Stratiomys
- Species: S. norma

Binomial name
- Stratiomys norma Wiedemann, 1830

Synonyms
- Stratiomyia quadrigemina Loew, 1866

Species of fly

Stratiomys norma is a species of soldier fly in the family Stratiomyidae.

== Distribution ==
Canada, United States.
