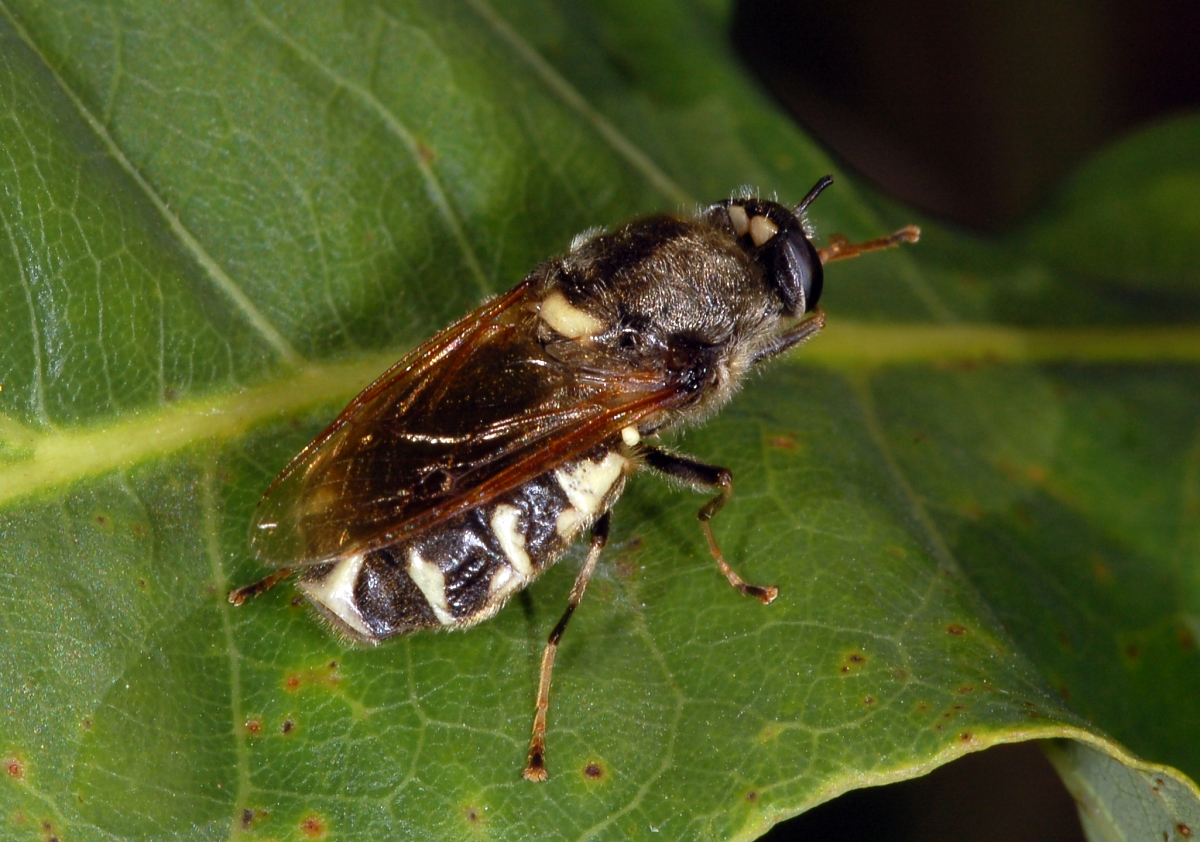

Scientific classification
- Kingdom: Animalia
- Phylum: Arthropoda
- Clade: Pancrustacea
- Class: Insecta
- Order: Diptera
- Family: Stratiomyidae
- Subfamily: Stratiomyinae
- Tribe: Stratiomyini
- Genus: Stratiomys
- Species: S. singularia

Binomial name
- Stratiomys singularia (Harris, 1776)

Synonyms
- Musca singularior Harris, 1776; Stratiomys furcata Fabricius, 1794; Stratiomys riparia Meigen, 1822

= Stratiomys singularia =

Species of fly

Stratiomys singularia, the flecked general, is a Palearcticspecies of soldier fly.

== Description ==
Body length 13,5–17 mm. Eyes of the male hairy, and those of the female bare without any yellow postocular collar.Face completely black with white hair. Frons with a yellow band interrupted above the antennae Occiput yellow at the top. (female), entirely black (male).Femora (ventral face) black (male), base orange. Tibiae and venter mainly black, the latter with pale bands.Tarsi red. Halteres yellow. Abdomen dorsally with three pairs of small, yellow spots and the apex yellow or orange. Larvae - Body: brown with long, darker longitudinal spots. Last segment very elongated, about twice as long as the penultimate, sternites II and III with a small, barely noticeable anterior spiny protuberance. Length 60mm.

== Biology ==
Found in wetland habitats, humid places, brackish water from June to August. The adults feed on the nectar and pollen of Umbelliferae. The larvae are detritus feeding in shallow, sometimes temporary pools.

== Distribution ==
Western Europe, European Russia, Caucasus, Russian Far East, Siberia, Central Asia.
