= Charterhouse (monastery) =

Monastery of Carthusian monks

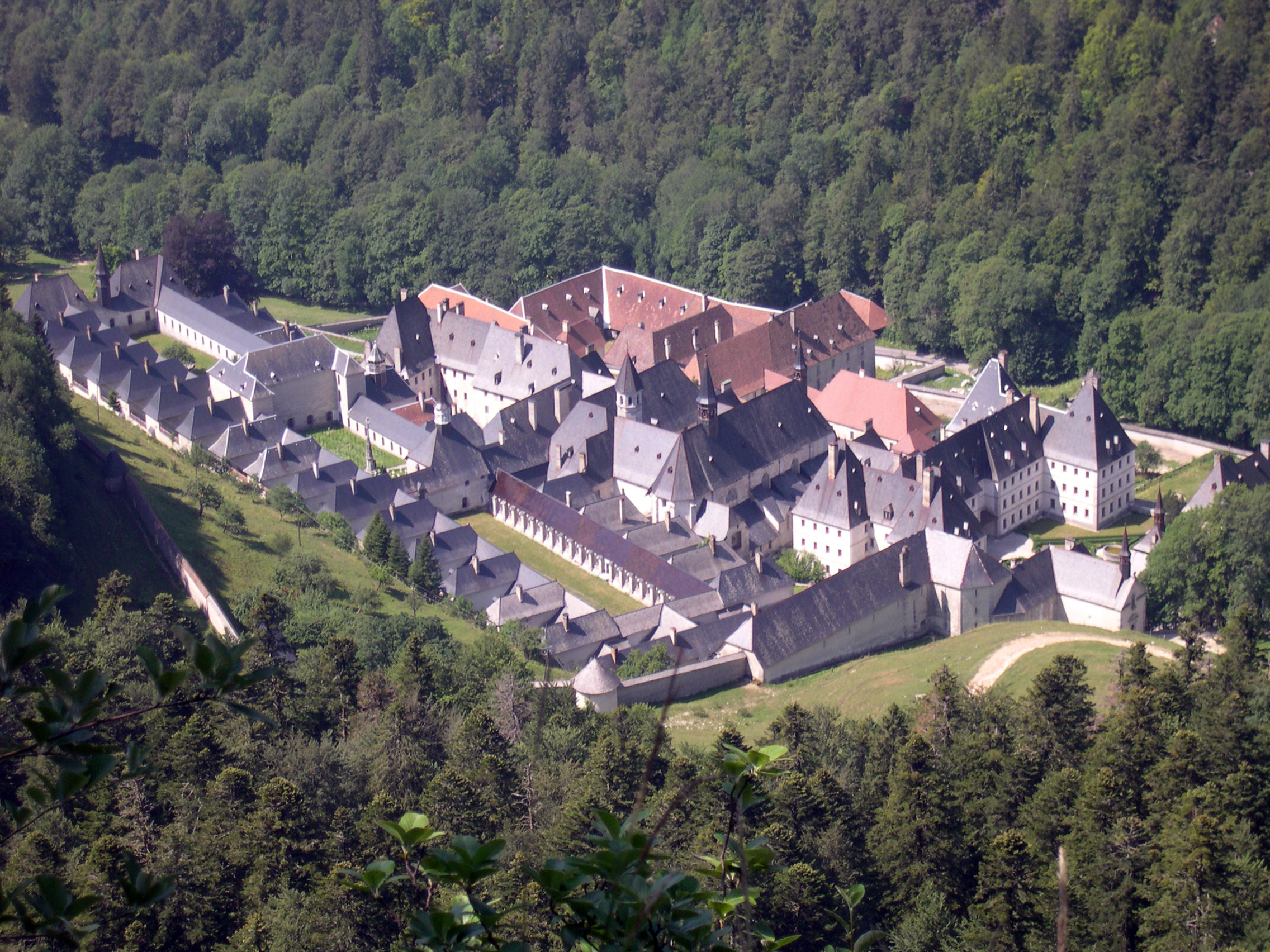
Grande Chartreuse

A charterhouse (French: chartreuse; German: Kartause; Italian: certosa; Portuguese: cartuxa; Spanish: cartuja) is a monastery of Carthusian monks. The English word is derived by phono-semantic matching from the French word chartreuse and it is therefore sometimes misunderstood to indicate that the houses were created by charter, a grant of legal rights by a high authority.

The actual namesake is instead the first monastery of the order, the Grande Chartreuse, which St Bruno of Cologne established in a valley of the Chartreuse Mountains in 1084.

The London Charterhouse was the first English site to which this English version of the word was applied.

== See also ==
- Certosa (disambiguation), the Italian name for a Carthusian monastery
- Charterhouse (disambiguation)
- Chartreuse (disambiguation), the French name for a Carthusian monastery
- List of Carthusian monasteries
- Mélan Charterhouse
