= Polybioides raphigastra =

Scientific classification
- Kingdom: Animalia
- Phylum: Arthropoda
- Clade: Pancrustacea
- Class: Insecta
- Order: Hymenoptera
- Family: Vespidae
- Genus: Polybioides
- Species: P. raphigastra

Binomial name
- Polybioides raphigastra (Saussure, 1854)

Synonyms
- Polybia sumatrensis

Species of wasp

Polybioides raphigastra is a species of social wasp found in the forests of South East Asia and Indonesia. It has recently been placed in the tribe Ropalidiini. This species is known for the downward-spiraling shape of their nests, and for having colony sizes exceeding ten thousand members.

== Taxonomy and phylogeny ==
The Swiss entomologist Henri Louis Frédéric de Saussure described P. raphigastra in 1854. At the time, it was identified by the synonym Polybia sumatrensis de Saussure.

P. raphigastra is one of six known species that comprise the genus Polybioides. Four of these species live in South East Asia, Indonesia, and the Philippines, and the other two are located in equatorial Africa. Polybioides were recently included in the tribe Ropalidiini, which, along with Polistini, Epiponini, and Mischocyttarini, make up the subfamily Polistinae.

Other members of the genus include: Polybioides angustus, Polybioides gracilis, Polybioides melaina, Polybioides psecas, and Polybioides tabidus.

== Description and identification ==
P. raphigastra bodies are composed of mostly dark areas, with lighter areas near the edge of segmented appendages. These dark areas are pale brown with light areas maintaining various shades of yellow.

=== Nests ===
The species nests in closed cavities such as caves and hollow trees. When nests are constructed within tree trunks, the trunks are often left entirely intact, with only small crevices giving access to the internal cavities that house the nest. In the trunk cavity, nests hang vertically with the envelope surrounding the nest directly attached to the inside of the cavity. Nests, often ovoidal in shape, may measure approximately 23 cm in length, with maximum diameters of 14.5 x 16 cm. Nests may contain well over ten thousand cells. Nests are egg-shaped and formed of a single, helicoidal comb that winds upon itself eight or nine times in a fashion so that each whorl is partially enclosed by the following one. Nests are entirely composed of very short plant hairs bound together by differing levels of secretion. Nest color is brown to yellowish, and the envelope may be darker than the cells inside. The outer envelope displays crescent-like patterns of colors varying from white to reddish brown. Each whorl on the nest is composed of two parts: a lower aspect constitutes the comb and an upper aspect that forms the envelope; leading to the number of layers of the envelope being roughly equivalent to the number of tiers of whorls. The curved structure, which curls spirally on itself in a series of layers, growing larger and larger may vaguely resemble the shell of a sea snail. Towards the center of each tier, the cells axes point downwards while near the edge of the envelope (the periphery) they are faced almost horizontal. The architecture of P. raphigastra nests appear to be unique among the Vespidae, though spiral combs may be found in other species of swarm-founding Ropalidiini and Epiponini. Additionally, its tendency to enwrap and protect previously built structures as it grows is similar to Agelaia areata.

== Distribution and habitat ==
P. raphigastra resides primarily in the forests of South East Asia and Indonesia. However, the genus as a whole has a quite peculiar geographical distribution as it contains species residing in the Philippines and equatorial Africa. P. raphigastra constructs elaborate nests inside small cavities such as tree trunks. These nests are characterized by vertical combs surrounded by an envelope.

== Colony cycle ==
=== Colony initiation ===
Due to the exclusively tropical distribution of these wasps, it is suspected that colony initiation occurs akin to most of the South-American Polistinae, in which colonies are founded by a group of individuals of which at least one is a fertilized female. This type of colony foundation is also referred to as swarming. Founded colonies are pleiometrotic, meaning that there may be two or more egg-laying, fertilized females in the same nest.

== Behavior ==
=== Treatment of immature brood ===
When looking at the nest of P. raphigastra during the growing season, a large number of immature instars may be found throughout the nest. Eggs, larvae, and pupae are found in hexagonal cells at various distances from the start of the comb and there is evidence that cells are reused several times for the function of brood rearing. It has been shown that the majority of cells are bottomless with a maximum length of 0.7 cm, with only the most recently built cells having bottoms. A habit they have in common with all of the Ropalidiini tribe is that bottoms of cells are cut off very early by adults, leaving full grown larvae to lie in the cell with their abdomens protruding out of the cell. Pupae benefit from a two-domed cocoon that is reinforced with similar material used for nest building. The posterior dome has an opening that allows for the extraction of the peritrophic sac, which is where larval faeces accumulate. These findings indicate a degree of parental care that includes the elimination of excretions. Additionally, eggs are attached laterally onto the wall of cells that are open on both sides.

=== Pheromone signaling ===
One of the most important activities that must be coordinated in a colony of social insects is the response to danger. These defensive responses may vary greatly, ranging from mass attacks to full-scale retreats back into the nest. In most species, these responses have shown to be regulated by pheromones produced by various glands. Field experiments in which crushed venom glands and stings of P. raphigastra workers were placed close to the opening of a P. raphigastra nest showed that the number of wasps leaving the nest entrance was significantly higher when these glands were presented relative to the control (crushed thoraces). Similarly, when the crushed glands and control were presented simultaneously near the entrance to the nest, workers were not only more attracted to the glands but in many cases attempted to sting the area around them. It is known that this same behavior may be elicited in other social wasp species as well.

=== Mimicry ===
There are many mimics of P. raphigastra. Stratiomyid flies may successfully fly along with members of Polybioides. There are also mantispids with the same general body constitution and coloration as P. raphigastra. Polistes meadeanus, also known as Polybia andrei and Polybio shelfordi, imitates Polybioides so effectively that even experienced hymenopterists may fail to recognize they are of the genus Polistes.

=== Caste differentiation ===
It has been shown that in some nests of P. raphigastra, only 25% of the specimens may be males. No obvious morphological distinctions may be made between queens and workers, though it is simple to group males apart from females. However, within those grouped as females there is considerable variation in size, indicating that there may be a distinct queen and worker caste.

== Interactions with other species ==
=== Defense ===
It is well known that members of the species respond aggressively to vertebrate animals, with workers often attacking unprovoked at great distances away from the nest, and continuing to pursue their victims for several minutes. Further, these individual workers may effectively tag an enemy and elicit a colony-wide threat response via pheremones located in their venom glands. It is this aggressive response, shared by all members of the genus Polybioides, that was utilized by the Viet Cong during the Vietnam War. Guerrilla fighters would employ swarms of bees in booby traps intentioned to quick-release these territorial wasps directly nearby enemy troops. The simultaneous aggressive response would leave victims with up to 200 stings, virtually ensuring mortality.

== Stings ==
=== Sting autotomy ===
The occurrences of sting autotomy in P. raphigastra is the first reported for a Ropalidiine species. Autotomy is a common phenomenon in bees and has also been found to occur in several wasp species of the tribes Epiponini and Polistini. Autotomy is the ability of an organism to shed or discard one of its own appendages. In P. raphigastra, this ability has shown to be a special defensive mechanism against vertebrate predators.

=== Sting morphology ===
It is hypothesized that autotomy in P. raphigastra occurs as a result of the shape and size of their sting barbs. Stings resemble two sharp rods clasped together and tapered off in width closer to the end known as lancets. The external surface of the lancets possess large, well developed barbs through the length of the sting that are arranged in a helicoidal distribution. The inner passage between the two lancets is the canal through which venom travels as it exits the sting. In P. raphigastra, this otherwise smooth median margin contains a tooth-like structure and a semicircular incisure. It is proposed that these artifacts, along with the arrangement of the barbs, serve to impede the extraction of stings from the victim.

=== Components of the venom ===
Venom sacs contain both saturated and unsaturated linear hydrocarbons of a chain length between 11 and 18 carbon atoms. The major components are pentadecane and pentadecene. P. raphigastra venom is also known to contain phenol, benzaldehyde, phenylacetaldehyde, naphthalene, indene, limonene and decanal. Additionally, several compounds that have been identified in their venom function as alarm pheromones in other species of social insect.
