= Stratiomys meigenii =

Scientific classification
- Kingdom: Animalia
- Phylum: Arthropoda
- Class: Insecta
- Order: Diptera
- Family: Stratiomyidae
- Subfamily: Stratiomyinae
- Tribe: Stratiomyini
- Genus: Stratiomys
- Species: S. meigenii

Binomial name
- Stratiomys meigenii Wiedemann, 1830

Synonyms
- Stratiomyia angularis Loew, 1866; Stratiomyia marginalis Loew, 1866; Stratiomys robusta Walker, 1854; Stratiomys meigeni Malloch, 1917; Stratiomys rubra James, 1933

Species of fly

Stratiomys meigenii is a species of soldier fly in the family Stratiomyidae.

== Distribution ==
Canada, United States.
