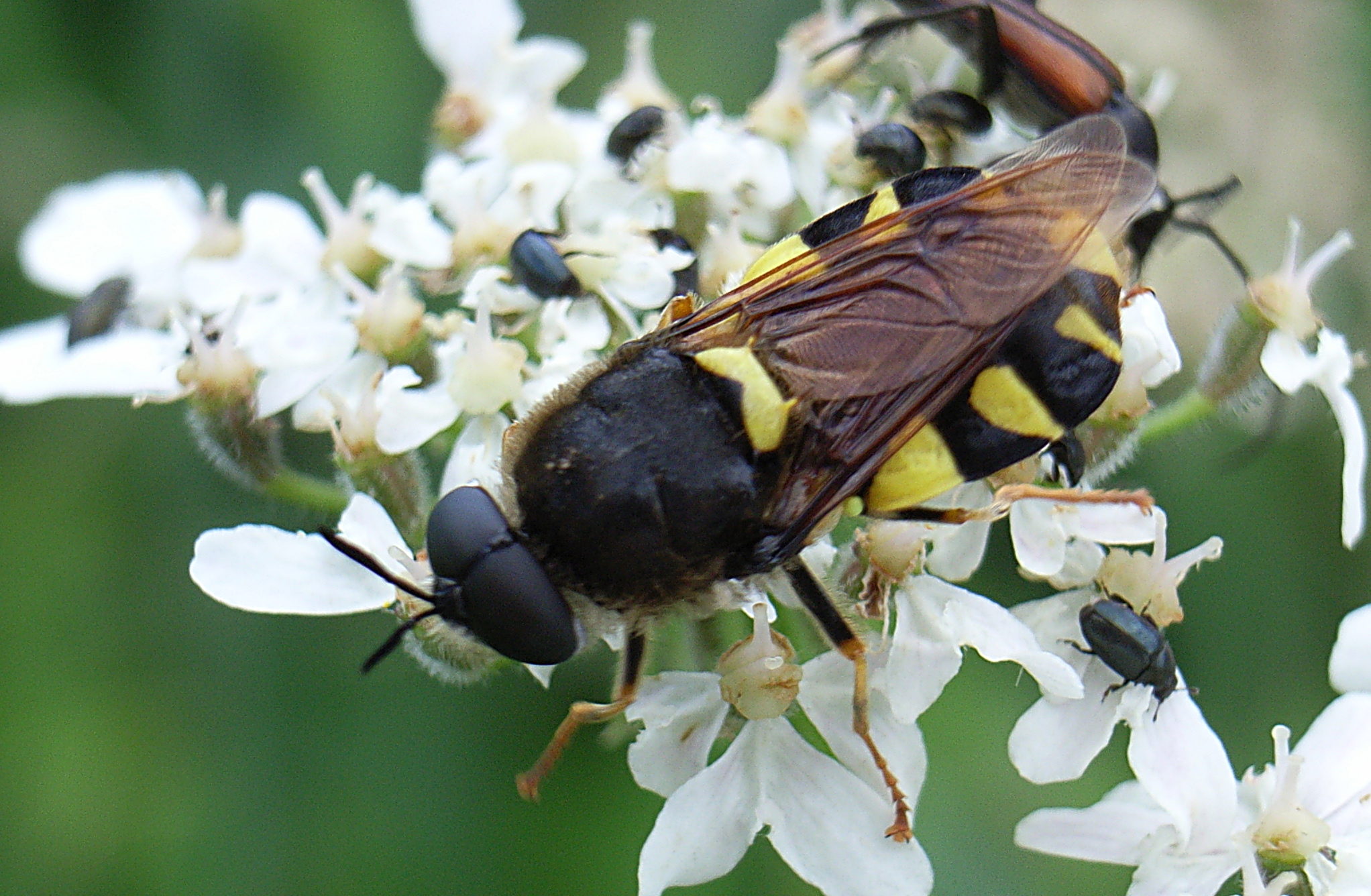

Scientific classification
- Kingdom: Animalia
- Phylum: Arthropoda
- Clade: Pancrustacea
- Class: Insecta
- Order: Diptera
- Family: Stratiomyidae
- Subfamily: Stratiomyinae
- Tribe: Stratiomyini
- Genus: Stratiomys
- Species: S. chamaeleon

Binomial name
- Stratiomys chamaeleon (Linnaeus, 1758)

Synonyms
- Musca sellata Sulzer, 1761; Musca chamaeleon Linnaeus, 1758; Musca spatula Scopoli, 1763; Musca chamelion Harris, 1778; Stratiomys nigrodentata Meigen, 1804; Stratiomys chamoeleon Macquart, 1826; Stratiomys rhaetica Jaennicke, 1866; Stratiomyia flavoscutellata Wulp, 1885; Stratiomys unguicornis Becker, 1887; Stratiomyia kasnakowi Pleske, 1901; Stratiomyia kosnakowi Pleske, 1901; Stratiomyia winogradowinikitini Pleske, 1922; Stratiomyia kasnakovi Pleske, 1924; Stratiomyia vinogradovinikitini Pleske, 1924

= Stratiomys chamaeleon =

Species of fly

Stratiomys chamaeleon, the clubbed general, is a European species of soldier fly.

== Description ==
Male Glossy black with yellow spots.The eyes are circled by a narrow yellow band. Face with greyish hair and a small triangular spot of yellow hairs. The scutellum is reddish-yellow with yellow on each side. The thoracic spines often black at the tip. Legs yellow, femurs black. Wings slightly brownish. Abdomen: tergites with three pairs of spots, the last ones smaller, the tip of the abdomen yellow; sternites with small black spots, broken in the middle. Female Face yellow with a black band. Abdomen: sternites with wide black bands. Legs yellow, femurs ringed with black. Length 14–15.5 mm.

== Biology ==
It is found in moist places on umbellifers; in May on hawthorn and marsh marigold flowers; in summer on aquatic plants.

== Distribution ==
It has a widespread Palearctic distribution, occurring in Southern Europe and parts of Asia. It has a very restricted range in Britain, where it is regarded as endangered.

== Ecology ==
In Britain larvae have been found in tufa-rich flush systems. Elsewhere larvae of Stratiomys chamaeleon have been recorded from the margins of freshwater ponds and spring pools as well as from semi saline conditions. Adults are on the wing from late June to the middle of August, with peak occurring in mid to late July and feed on nectar, mostly from umbellifers.
