= Hinton House, Hinton Charterhouse =

Building in Somerset, England

Hinton House
- Location within Somerset
- 51.3240°N 2.3240°W
- Location: Hinton Charterhouse, Somerset, England

Listed Building – Grade II*
- Official name: Hinton House
- Designated: 1 February 1956
- Reference no.: 1136140

Hinton House in Hinton Charterhouse, Somerset, England was built around 1700. It is a Grade II* listed building.

== History ==
The house was built around 1700 on the site of an earlier monastic grange and barn. Various renovations and expansions of the house took place in the first half of the 19th century.

In the 1940s and 1950s the house was enlarged by George Phillips Manners and John Elkington Gill, and the house was converted into three flats.

In 2017 an application was made to alter the access roads to the house.

== Architecture ==
The three-bay stone building has a slate roof with a balustraded parapet. The attached conservatory has an arcade of six Tuscan columns.

The grounds feature specimen trees and a walled kitchen garden.
