= Parhadrestia =

Scientific classification
- Kingdom: Animalia
- Phylum: Arthropoda
- Class: Insecta
- Order: Diptera
- Family: Stratiomyidae
- Subfamily: Parhadrestiinae
- Genus: Parhadrestia; James, 1975

Type species
- Parhadrestia atava James, 1975

Subfamily of flies

Parhadrestia is a genus of flies in the family Stratiomyidae.

== Species ==
- Parhadrestia atava James, 1975
- Parhadrestia curico Woodley, 1986
