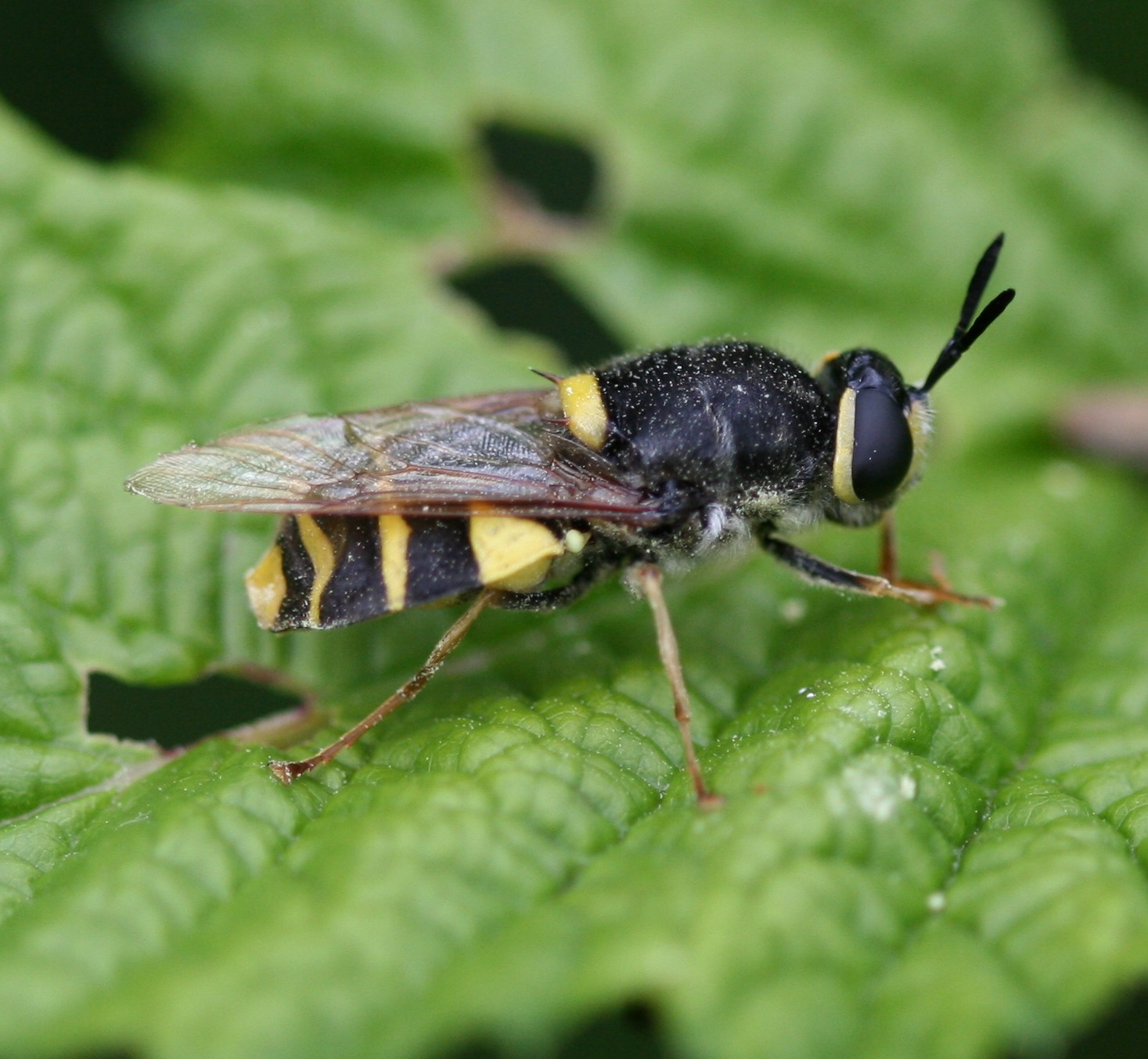
- Female

Scientific classification
- Kingdom: Animalia
- Phylum: Arthropoda
- Clade: Pancrustacea
- Class: Insecta
- Order: Diptera
- Family: Stratiomyidae
- Subfamily: Stratiomyinae
- Tribe: Stratiomyini
- Genus: Stratiomys
- Species: S. potamida

Binomial name
- Stratiomys potamida Meigen, 1822

Synonyms
- Stratiomys chamaeleon Walker, 1851; Stratiomys splendens Verrall, 1909

= Stratiomys potamida =

Species of fly

Stratiomys potamida, the banded general, is a European species of soldier fly.

== Description ==
The abdomen: tergite III, with linear and pointed yellow markings on the inner face (male), or forming a single band (female); sternites yellow with four narrow black stripes. Scutellum black at the base, spines completely yellow. Face and eye orbits yellow (female), head almost entirely black. Hair yellow, thicker on the eye area, near the mouth. The colour of the abdominal spots ranges from lemon yellow to brick red. Length: 14.5–15.5 mm.

== Biology ==
The habitat is wetlands, fens, pond edges, damp heaths, damp woodlands, alder carr.The larva is aquatic.
