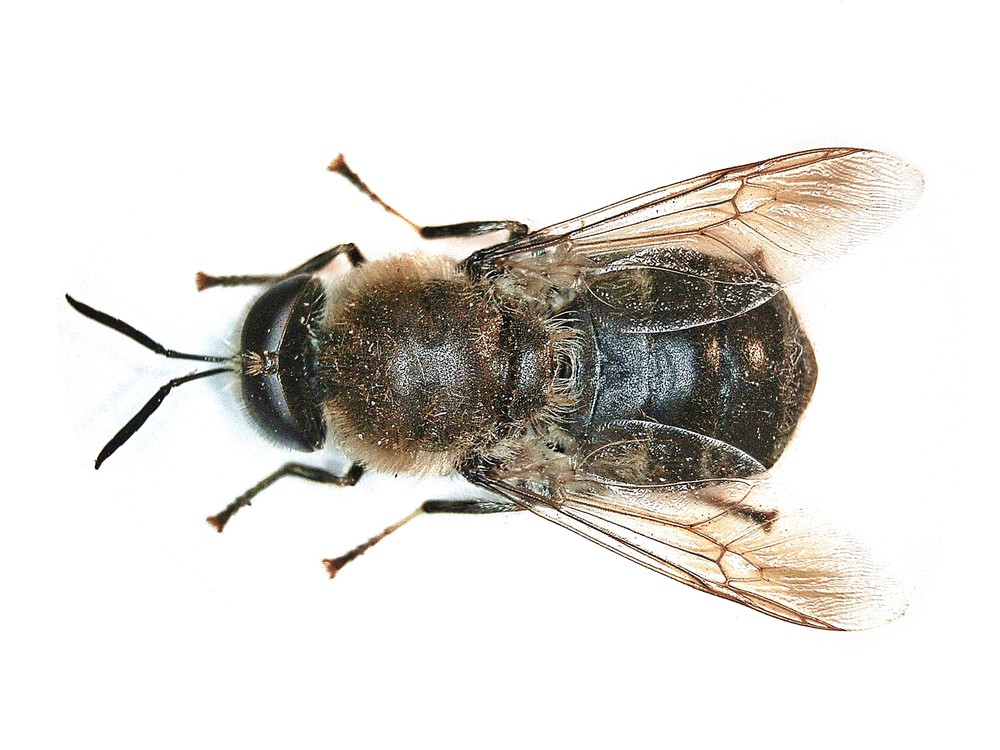

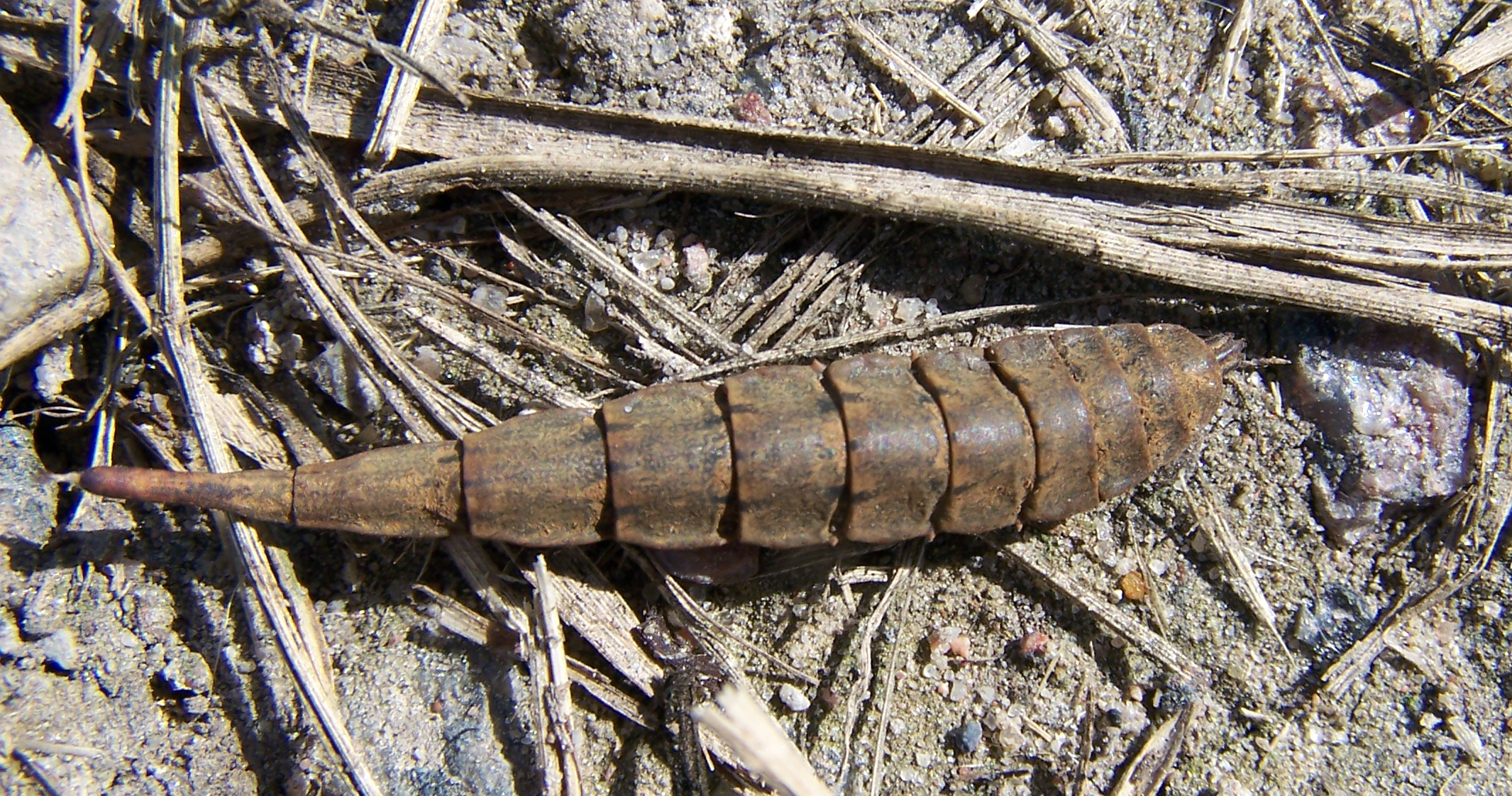

Scientific classification
- Kingdom: Animalia
- Phylum: Arthropoda
- Clade: Pancrustacea
- Class: Insecta
- Order: Diptera
- Family: Stratiomyidae
- Subfamily: Stratiomyinae
- Tribe: Stratiomyini
- Genus: Stratiomys
- Species: S. longicornis

Binomial name
- Stratiomys longicornis (Scopoli, 1763)

Synonyms
- Hirtea longicornis Scopoli, 1763; Musca tenebrica Harris, 1776; Stratiomys tenebrica (Harris, 1776)

= Stratiomys longicornis =

Species of fly

Stratiomys longicornis, the long-horned general, is a European species of soldier fly.

== Description ==
The eyes have a blue transverse band.They are hairy (both sexes) and circled with yellow. The head is black,the face yellowish with thick whitish hair and two yellow spots on the black occiput. The thorax is black with long reddish hairs (male), of a dirty reddish or slightly whitish color, less dense (female). The scutellum is black, with yellow tips, the legs black, base of tibias and first segments of tarsi reddish. The wings are clear, slightly darkened, brown at the apical part, veins brown. Abdomen: tergites shiny black, with some iridescent spots formed by short hair and sometimes very narrow lateral apical yellow spots; sternites black with yellow transverse bands on the posterior edge.- L. 12-16 mm. The larva is brown, with darker spots arranged in longitudinal series, the last segment slightly longer than the penultimate (length: 38 mm). A small spiny protuberance on the anterior angle of the first four abdominal segments. - Length 35-50 mm.

== Biology ==
It is found on plants by water on reeds, wood and foliage.they visit umbellifer flowers, notably Hemlock Water-dropwort. The fly in late May-early June, The larva is aquatic.
