= Chartreuse =

Chartreuse (French: [ʃaʁtʁøz]) may refer to:

== Common meanings ==
- Chartreuse (liqueur), a French liqueur
- Chartreuse (color), a yellow-green color named after the liqueur
- Grande Chartreuse, the original Carthusian monastery

== Other uses ==
- Chartreuse (band), an English indie rock band
- Chartreuse (dish), a French dish of vegetables or meat tightly wrapped in vegetable leaves and cooked in a mould
- Chartreuse Mountains, a range of mountains in France
- "Chartreuse", a 2012 song by ZZ Top about the French liqueur
- Chartreuse (fr), type of country house in the southwest of France

== See also ==
- Chartreux, a breed of cat
- Institution des Chartreux, a private school
- Charterhouse (disambiguation)
