= Church of St John the Baptist, Hinton Charterhouse =

Church in Somerset, England

Church of St John the Baptist
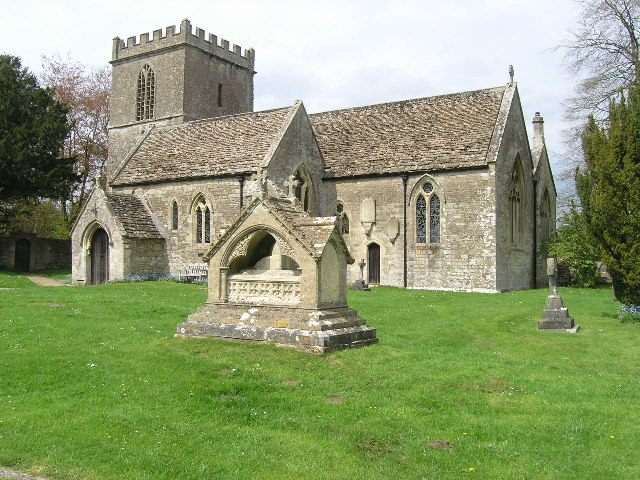

- Location within Somerset
- 51°19′24″N 2°19′19″W
- Location: Hinton Charterhouse, Somerset, England

History
- Built: 12th century

Listed Building – Grade II*
- Designated: 1 February 1956
- Reference no.: 1136127

The Church of St John the Baptist is an Anglican parish church in Hinton Charterhouse, Somerset, England. It was built in the 12th century and designated a Grade II* listed building.

The church pre-dates the former Carthusian Hinton Priory in the village from 1232. The priory was founded in 1232 by Ela, Countess of Salisbury, and the prior had the right to tithes from the village following a dispute and to appoint the vicar of the church until the Dissolution of the Monasteries in 1539.

During the 13th century, the south chapel and porch were added to the original 12th-century building. Restoration of the three-stage tower occurred in 1770, and there was further restoration in the 19th century.

The parish is part of the benefice of Freshford, Limpley Stoke, and Hinton Charterhouse within the archdeaconry of Bath.

== See also ==
- List of ecclesiastical parishes in the Diocese of Bath and Wells
