= Polybioides =

Scientific classification
- Kingdom: Animalia
- Phylum: Arthropoda
- Clade: Pancrustacea
- Class: Insecta
- Order: Hymenoptera
- Family: Vespidae
- Subfamily: Polistinae
- Tribe: Ropalidiini
- Genus: Polybioides; Buysson, 1913

Type species
- Polybioides tabidus (Fabricius, 1781

Genus of wasps

Polybioides is a genus of paper wasp of the sub-family Polistinae which contains six species which are found in the Neotropical, Afrotropical and Indomalayan zoogeographic regions.

== Species ==
- Polybioides angustus Vecht, 1966
- Polybioides gracilis Vecht, 1966
- Polybioides melaina (Meade-Waldo, 1911)
- Polybioides psecas R. du Buysson, 1913
- Polybioides raphigastra (Saussure, 1854)
- Polybioides tabidus (Fabricius, 1781)
