= Charterhouse to Eashing =

Protected area in Surrey, England

Coordinates: 51.190°N 0.641°W

- Site of Special Scientific Interest
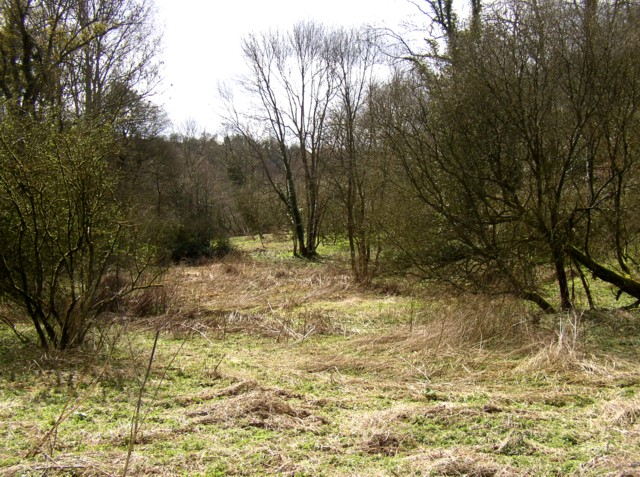
- Location of Charterhouse to Eashing.
- Area of search: Surrey
- Grid reference: SU 951 443
- Interest: Biological
- Area: 68.4 hectares (169 acres)
- Notification date: 1986
- Location map: Magic Map

Charterhouse to Eashing is a 68.4-hectare (169-acre) biological Site of Special Scientific Interest west of Godalming in Surrey.

This is a steep valley cut through a broad flood plain. Much of the site is wooded, with areas of tall fen, grassland and standing water. There is a diverse fly population, including several rare species, such as Lonchoptera scutellata cranefly, Stratiomys potamida and the cranefly Gonomyia bifida.
