= Certosa =

Certosa is an Italian word meaning Carthusian monastery, or charterhouse. It may refer to:

- Certosa di Bologna, a former monastery which was turned into a monumental cemetery
- Certosa di Farneta, near Lucca in Tuscany
- Certosa di Ferrara
- Certosa del Galluzzo, near Florence in Tuscany
- Certosa di Padula, near Salerno in southern Italy
- Certosa di Parma
- Certosa di Pavia
- Certosa di Pavia (comune), a small town in Lombardy near to, and named after the monastery
- Certosa di San Martino, a former monastery complex, now a museum, in Naples
- La Certosa, an island near Venice

== See also ==
- Charterhouse (monastery)
- List of Carthusian monasteries
- Pisa Charterhouse
