= Polybioides tabidus =

Scientific classification
- Kingdom: Animalia
- Phylum: Arthropoda
- Clade: Pancrustacea
- Class: Insecta
- Order: Hymenoptera
- Family: Vespidae
- Subfamily: Polistinae
- Tribe: Ropalidiini
- Genus: Polybioides
- Species: P. tabidus

Binomial name
- Polybioides tabidus (Fabricius, 1781)

Synonyms
- Polybia bucula Buysson, 1902; Polybia isabellina Schulthess, 1913

Species of wasp

Polybioides tabidus, the African swarm-founding wasp, is a social paper wasp from the order Hymenoptera that is typically found in Central Africa. This wasp is unique in that it exhibits cyclical oligogyny, meaning queen number varies with colony cycle. After several generations of production of workers and future queens, a subset of many workers and queens leave the original colony to begin a new one. The new colony does not produce new queens until current queens from the old colony have died. P. tabidus has been observed to display both predator and scavenger behavior, depending on the food sources available.

== Taxonomy and phylogeny ==
Polybioides tabidus is a member of the subfamily Polistinae, which exclusively contains social wasps. Four tribes make up Polistinae: Polistini, Epiponini, Mischocyttarini, and Ropalidiini. Out of the three swarm-founding groups of wasps, two are found in the tribe Ropalidiini—the genus Polybioides and some wasps of the genus Ropalidia—and the third swarm-founding group includes the tribe Epiponini. The genus Polybioides is most closely related to Belonogaster based on a phylogenetic tree.

P. tabidus was originally described by Johan Christian Fabricius in 1781 as (Vespa tabida) and has two other taxonomic synonyms (subsequently named species later found to be identical to P. tabidus): Polybia bucula named in 1902 by Du Buysson and Polybia isabellina named by Schulthess in 1913.

== Description and identification ==
=== Caste differences in queens and workers ===
There is a distinct difference in morphological characteristics between queens and workers. Queens have long bristles on their heads—specifically their eyes, vertex, and antennae—and on their thorax. The workers' bristles on their heads and thoraces are much shorter than the queen's. Leg and wing bristles of workers and queens are comparable in length. Queens typically have longer wings and larger metasomal segments. It is suggested that reproductive ability may be possible in both castes, as some workers have been observed to possess developed ovaries.

=== Nest structure ===
The nests of P. tabidus are relatively small, especially when compared to its Old World relative Polybioides melainus. Nests typically contain hexagonal cells arranged into multiple vertical combs, which are aligned adjacent to each other. The combs are not attached to each other, but a thin envelope encases the combs into a unit. The top of the entire unit is attached to the bottom of a branch while the bottom can freely hang. The closed sides of the two central combs are oriented toward each other, and the entrances to each comb are toward the bottom of the nest.

== Distribution and habitat ==
Like all other wasps of the tribe Ropalidiini, P. tabidus is distributed in the Old World. P. tabidus is mainly found in the forest areas of tropical Central Africa. P. tabidus has been studied in Cameroon and Western Kenya, namely the Kakamega Forest Reserve.

== Colony cycle ==
The colony cycle begins when a swarm of multiple queens and hundreds of workers leave their original colony and found a new colony. Due to the environment, P. tabidus queens do not need to overwinter, and colonies can be perennial and large—mature colonies can have anywhere from 2,000 to 6,000 workers. Large colony size decreases the risk of predation associated with nest initiation.

== Behavior ==
=== Swarm-founding ===
For swarm-founding to occur, wasps must be able to follow the path of wasps before them. In swarm-founding species, workers rub their gasters in distinct movements on objects along the route of their path. In some swarm-founding species, workers release glandular secretions which coordinate swarming by attracting the wasps that follow. Although P. tabidus lacks these sternal glands, workers still rub their gasters and are capable of following worker trails. Swarm-founding allows colonies to be larger and have more longevity relative to independent-founding colonies. Where swarm founders and independent founders coexist, which is the case in some areas of the New World, swarm founders tend to dominate due to better division of labor.

=== Cooperation ===
The degree of relatedness between workers and queens influences the amount of positive cooperation within the colony. When workers and queens are more related, there is more cooperation. Thus, the process of limited queen production—cyclical oligogyny—maintains cooperation in P. tabidus by making workers more related than would be expected in a typical colony of multiple queens. Workers are more inclined to limit their own reproduction and focus on helping their relatives reproduce if the relatives share a high proportion of the workers’ genes. Workers are promoting the propagation of their own genes when they help close relatives reproduce.

== Kin selection ==
=== Genetic relatedness within colonies ===
The typical Hymenopteran haplo-diploid genetic system of relatedness—where females share a 0.75-degree of relatedness with their sisters and only a 0.50-degree with their brothers—is not found in P. tabidus. Hamilton's rule of haplodiploidy is not followed in this species, as queens do not mate singly. Workers are more related than would be expected in multiple queen colonies due to a process of queen production called cyclical oligogyny, where daughter queens are often full sisters. According to kin selection theory, individuals who act altruistically are selected when the ratio of the cost of the fitness of the giver to the benefit of recipient is less than the degree of relatedness between the two individuals. Workers of P. tabidus share elevated relatedness and, thus, benefit through cooperation in aiding relatives and swarm-founding.

=== Cyclical oligogyny ===
P. tabidus exhibits cyclical oligogyny, where queen number varies with colony cycle. After several generations of production of workers and future queens, a subset of many workers and queens leave the original colony to begin a new colony. The number of queens in a colony must be reduced to one or a few queens before new queens are produced. Thus, new queens share a high degree of relatedness, increasing the relatedness of their progeny. Cyclical oligogyny is maintained by worker control of sex ratios. When there is only one or a few queens, workers are three times as related to females as they are to males. However, when there are more queens, workers are equally related to males and females. As a result, workers prefer to produce new queens when colonies have few queens and males when colonies have many queens. Cyclical oligogyny has evolved independently in the Neotropical epiponine swarm-founding wasps, such as Polybia emaciata.

=== Possible costs of cyclical oligogyny ===
Having a limited number of queens in a colony increases the risks associated with queen loss. This cost is not as great when more queens can easily be produced to replace the queens lost. However, it is suggested that caste determination in P. tabidus occurs early in development. Thus, queens are typically the only females that have reproductive ability. A consequence of limited reproductive ability is that queens are not easily replaced. Another cost of cyclical oligogyny is reproductive efficiency. P. tabidus queens have three ovarioles, Compared to single-queen Vespa colonies of similar size where queens have up to twelve ovarioles. This makes brood production difficult when there is only one queen. However, this case is rare and is therefore not detrimental toward reproductive fecundity. Reduced queen number typically occurs in a new swarm. Mature swarms are large and have many queens that produce males and new swarms.

=== Worker control and policing ===
Workers are more related to their own sons than to the queen's sons. However, workers are more related to the queen's sons than sons of other workers. This is because swarm-founding colonies are typically large and have multiple queens, making workers more related to queens than other workers. Because of the difference in degree of relatedness, a worker would be more inclined to care for the queen’s sons than to a son of another worker. Worker policing effectively preserves the collective interests of the colony by controlling the production of males within a colony and limiting male production to only the queen. Another situation of worker policing is found in cyclical oligogyny, where males are only produced when there are multiple queens in the colony and workers are equally related to males and females. Workers typically participate in worker policing when the degree of relatedness between workers is relatively low.

== Interaction with other species ==
=== Nesting association ===
Nests of Polybioides tabidus are found to be attractive nesting sites for seven species of small birds in Yaoundé, Cameroon—including the spectacled weaver (Ploceus ocularis), and the common fiscal (Lanius collaris). Smaller birds, such as the spectacled weaver, are found in closer proximity to nests than the common fiscal and other larger birds. The difference in distance of association between small and large birds is due to the fact that larger birds would be more likely to perturb a wasp nest when it lands on a proximal branch.

=== Predation and pest control ===
P. tabidus workers display scavenger behaviors when they are presented with dead animals, such as vertebrates, while foraging. Workers can also act as predators, especially toward competitors for desired food sources. Workers choose between carrion and fruit food sources depending on availability. As a consequence of the preferred diet of P. tabidus—food sources high in sugar or protein—workers must come in contact with many other scavengers, such as the aphid Toxoptera citridus. T. citridus is a known citrus pest, so this interspecies interaction suggests that P. tabidus could be an agent in pest control.
