= Hinton Charterhouse Field =

Protected area in Somerset, England

- Site of Special Scientific Interest
- Location within Somerset
- Location of Hinton Charterhouse Field.
- Area of search: Avon
- Grid reference: ST764574
- Coordinates: 51.31522°N 2.34000°W
- Interest: Biological
- Area: 0.32 hectares (0.0032 km^{2}; 0.0012 sq mi)
- Notification date: 1991

Hinton Charterhouse Field (grid reference ST764574) is a 0.32 hectare biological Site of Special Scientific Interest (SSSI) near the village of Hinton Charterhouse in Bath and North East Somerset, United Kingdom. It was SSSI notified in 1991.

The site is situated on a west-facing slope of a shallow valley of the Cotswolds to the south of Bath and is underlain by Oolitic Limestone. The sward contains a population of the nationally rare Field Eryngo (Eryngium campestre).
