= The Charterhouse of Parma =

Novel by Stendhal

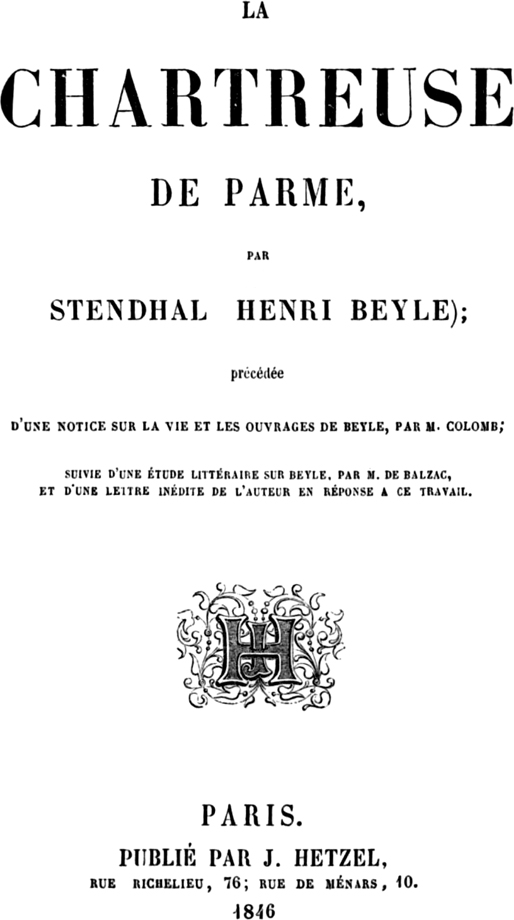
- Cover of the 1846 edition, preceded by a literary study on Stendhal by Balzac
- Author: Stendhal
- Original title: La Chartreuse de Parme
- Language: French
- Publication date: 1839
- Publication place: France

The Charterhouse of Parma (French: La Chartreuse de Parme) is a novel by French writer Stendhal, published in 1839. Telling the story of an Italian nobleman in the Napoleonic era and later, it was admired by Balzac, Tolstoy, André Gide, Lampedusa, Henry James, and Ernest Hemingway. It was inspired by an inauthentic Italian account of the dissolute youth of Alessandro Farnese. The novel has been adapted for opera, film and television.

The title refers to a Carthusian monastery, which is only mentioned on the last page of the novel and does not figure significantly in the plot.

== Synopsis ==
The Charterhouse of Parma chronicles the adventures of the young Italian nobleman Fabrice del Dongo from his birth in 1798 to his death. Fabrice spends his early years in his family's castle on Lake Como, while most of the rest of the novel is set in a fictionalized Parma (both locations are in modern-day Italy).

The book begins with the French army sweeping into Milan and stirring up the sleepy region of Lombardy, which was allied with Austria. Fabrice grows up surrounded by intrigues and alliances for and against the French—his father the Marchese comically fancies himself a spy for the Viennese. It is broadly hinted at that Fabrice may have actually been fathered by a visiting French lieutenant. The novel's early section describes Fabrice's rather quixotic effort to join Napoleon when the latter returns to France in March 1815 (the Hundred Days). Fabrice at seventeen is idealistic, rather naïve, and speaks poor French. However, he will not be stopped and leaves his home on Lake Como to travel north with false papers. He wanders through France, losing money and horses rapidly. He is imprisoned as a spy, but escapes with the aid of the jailer's wife who develops a fondness towards Fabrice, donning the uniform of a dead French hussar. In his excitement to play the role of a French soldier, he wanders onto the field at the Battle of Waterloo.

Stendhal, a veteran of several Napoleonic campaigns (he was one of the survivors of the retreat from Moscow in 1812), describes this famous battle as a chaotic affair: soldiers gallop one way and then another as bullets plow the fields around them. Fabrice briefly joins the guard of Field Marshal Ney, randomly comes across the man who may be his father (he commandeers Fabrice's horse), shoots one Prussian cavalryman while he and his regiment flee, and is lucky to survive with a serious wound to his leg (inflicted by a retreating French cavalryman). He eventually returns to his family's castle, injured, broke, and still wondering, "was I really in the battle?" Fabrice is quickly forced to flee since his sickly and dull older brother denounces him. Towards the end of the novel, his efforts, such as they are, lead people to say that he was one of Napoleon's bravest captains or colonels.

The novel divides its attention between him and his aunt Gina (his father's sister). Gina meets and befriends the Prime Minister of Parma, Count Mosca. Count Mosca proposes that Gina marry a wealthy old man, the Duke Sanseverina, who will be out of the country for many years as an ambassador, so that she and Count Mosca can be lovers while living under the social rules of the time. Gina responds, "But you realize that what you are suggesting is utterly immoral?" Nevertheless, she agrees, and so a few months later, Gina is the new social eminence in Parma's rather small aristocratic elite.

Gina (now the Duchess Sanseverina) has had very warm feelings for her nephew ever since he returned from France. Since going to join Napoleon was officially illegal, she and Count Mosca try to plan out a successful rehabilitation for the young man. Count Mosca's plan has Fabrice go to seminary school in Naples, with the idea that when he graduates he will come to Parma and become a senior figure in the religious hierarchy, and eventually the Archbishop, as the current office holder is old. The fact that Fabrice has no interest in religion (or celibacy) matters not to this plan. Fabrice reluctantly agrees and leaves for Naples.

The book then describes in great detail how Gina and Count Mosca live and operate in the court of the Prince of Parma (named Ranuce-Erneste IV). Stendhal, who spent decades as a professional diplomat in northern Italy, gives a lively and interesting account of the court, though all of what he describes is entirely fictional, as Parma was ruled by Napoleon's second wife, Marie Louise, Duchess of Parma during the time of the novel.

After several years of theology school in Naples, during which he has many affairs with local women, Fabrice returns to Parma. Fabrice had been afraid that he could never fall in love, and he is surprised when he develops romantic feelings towards Gina; the omniscient narrator tells us that she shares the same feelings although the characters never discuss them.

Fabrice becomes involved with a young actress whose manager/lover takes offense and tries to kill Fabrice. In the resulting fight, Fabrice kills the man and flees Parma for Bologna, fearing correctly that he will not be treated justly by the courts. After returning to Parma surreptitiously, Fabrice returns to Bologna, spending much time trying to form a relationship with an attractive soprano, Fausta; in the meantime, the judiciary have found him guilty of the murder. Distressed by these developments indicating that Fabrice may be executed, Gina goes to the Prince to plead for Fabrice's life stating she will leave Parma if he is not pardoned. While the Prince is alienated by Gina's dignity and independence, he fears that his court will become boring without her and that she will speak poorly about his dominion when she departs. He communicates his willingness to free Fabrice and yields to Gina's demand that he sign a note to release him. But the Count, in an effort to be diplomatic, omits the crucial phrase: "this unjust procedure will have no further effect." The following morning, the Prince connives to have Fabrice imprisoned for twelve years by signing an order affixed with a date preceding the note purporting to release him.

For the next nine months, Gina schemes to have Fabrice freed and manages to get secret messages relayed to him in the tower, in part by means of an improvised semaphore line. The Prince keeps spreading rumors that Fabrice is going to be executed as a way to put pressure on Gina. Meanwhile, Fabrice is oblivious to his danger and is living happily because he has fallen in love with the commandant's daughter, Clélia Conti, whom Fabrice can see from his prison window as she tends her caged birds. They fall in love, and after some time he persuades her to communicate with him by means of letters of the alphabet printed on sheets ripped from a book.

The happy Fabrice resists Gina's plans to escape. But Gina finally persuades him and has Clélia smuggle three long ropes to him. The only thing that concerns Fabrice is whether he will be able to meet Clélia after he escapes. But Clélia—who has feelings of guilt because the plot involved giving laudanum to her father, which she perceived as poison—promises the Virgin that she shall never see Fabrice again and will do anything her father says.

Gina puts in motion a plan to have the Prince of Parma assassinated. This plot is carried out by a poet/bandit/assassin Ferrante who has fallen in unrequited love with Gina. Count Mosca stays in Parma, and when the Prince does die (it is strongly implied that he was poisoned by Ferrante) he puts down a revolt by some local revolutionaries and installs the son of the Prince on the throne. The new Prince (only 21 years old) falls in love with Gina. When the prosecutor's indictments come close to the truth behind the uprising, Gina persuades the Prince to burn the documents.

Count Mosca, committed to installing Fabrice as the Vicar General, persuades Gina and Fabrice that Fabrice voluntarily return to be acquitted. Instead of going to the town jail, Fabrice voluntarily returns to the Farnese Tower to be close to Clélia. Seeking revenge, General Conti attempts to poison Fabrice, but Clélia keeps him from eating the poisoned food. A distraught Gina seeks the Prince's intervention to have him transferred, and he agrees to do so on the condition she gives herself to him. Gina so promises in duress. After three months, the Prince proposes marriage to Gina but is rejected. Gina submits to his physical demands and leaves immediately afterward. Gina never returns but marries Count Mosca. Clélia marries the wealthy Marchese her father has chosen for her, and Clélia and Fabrice live unhappily.

Once acquitted, Fabrice assumes his duties as the Vicar General in the Catholic Church, and his sermons become the talk of the town. The only reason he gives these sermons, Fabrice says, is in the hope that Clélia will come to one, allowing him to see her and speak to her. After fourteen months of suffering for both, she agrees to meet with him every night, on the condition that it is in darkness, lest she break her vow to the Madonna to never see him again and they both be punished for her sin. A year later she bears Fabrice's child. When the boy is two years old, Fabrice insists that he should take care of him in the future, because he is feeling lonely and worries that his own child will not love him. The plan he and Clélia devise is to fake the child's illness and death and then establish him secretly in a large house nearby, where Fabrice and Clélia can come to see him every day. After several months the child actually does die, and Clélia dies a few months after that. After her death, Fabrice retires to the titular Charterhouse of Parma (a Carthusian monastery), where he spends less than a year before he also dies. Gina, the Countess Mosca, who had always loved Fabrice, dies a short time after that. The novel ends with the epithet "To the Happy Few."

== Characters ==
The characters in the novel are frequently referred to only by their title of nobility and sometimes by their last name. Furthermore, both of these change during the course of the novel due to marriages and acquisition of titles.

The del Dongos

- Fabrice (aka Fabrizio) del Dongo, second son of the Marchese del Dongo from castle Grianta on Lake Como in the Lombardo-Venetian Kingdom. Later referred to as Monsignor. He assumes several aliases and uses false passports, including Vasi (a dealer in barometers), Boulot (a deceased French hussar), Giletti, and Giuseppe Bossi.
- Marchesa del Dongo, Fabrice's mother, referred to as the Marchesa.
- Marchese del Dongo, Fabrice's father, a cold and reactionary figure.
- Contessa Gina Pietranera, Fabrice's aunt and lifelong benefactor, referred to as the Contessa and later as the Duchessa Sanseverina (Sanseverina-Taxis) or simply the Duchessa. (Note: Gina is the Marchese del Dongo's sister. Since he is not Fabrice's biological father, Gina and Fabrice are not truly related to one another, though neither character understands this).

The Political Aristocracy of Parma

- Prince Ranuccio-Ernesto IV, the ruler of Parma, referred to as the Prince.
- Prince Ernesto V, the son and successor of Ernesto IV, also referred to as the Prince.
- Princess of Parma, Clara-Paolina, wife of Ernesto IV and the mother of Ernesto V, referred to as the Princess.
- Conte Mosca, often referred to as the Conte, Prime Minister of Parma, Minister of Police and several other titles, long time lover of Gina.
- General Fabio Conti, governor of the citadel and prison of Parma.
- Fiscal General Rassi, known as the Fiscal Rassi or Chief Justice, an incompetent and reactionary politician, "a man without honour and without humour."
- Marchesa Raversi, referred to as the Raversi, Conte Mosca's opponent and Rassi's co-conspirator, "a consummate intriguer"
- Father Landriani, Archbishop of Parma

Fabrice's Lovers, Friends, and Enemies

- Marietta, a comic actress, Fabrice's first lover.
- Giletti, a traveling comic actor, Marietta's abusive lover, killed by Fabrice.
- Fausta, a volatile opera singer, Fabrice's lover.
- Clelia Conti, daughter of General Fabio Conti, Fabrice's last and truest love.
- Marchese Crescenzi a wealthy aristocrat engaged to Clelia.
- Ferrante Palla a genius poet, revolutionary, and perhaps lunatic, living in self-imposed poverty. An ally of Gina with whom he is enthralled.
- Priore Blanès, parish priest of Grianta and astrologer, Fabrice's early mentor who made predictions about Fabrice's life.
- Ludovico, Fabrice's lifelong servant and friend.

== Translations ==
The best-known English translation The Charterhouse of Parma is by C. K. Scott Moncrieff (Boni and Liveright, 1925) and translated the French names of Italian characters in the original to Italian equivalents. Thus Fabrice becomes Fabrizio. The translation by Margaret Mauldon (Oxford University Press, 1997) retained the French names, while that by Richard Howard (Modern Library, 1999) uses the Italian names. According to Daniel Mendelsohn of the New York Times, this "obscures the important narrative conceit that this whole tale is one we're hearing from a Frenchman who has, in turn, heard it from Italians who knew the principals. It is a book about Italians, but one seen through French eyes." Mendelsohn goes on to say that the translation nonetheless "moves with admirable rapidity, fully conveying what James called the 'restlessness' of Stendhal's 'superior mind' by means of a number of subtle but quite concrete choices on Howard's part, not least of which is his rendering of French verbs more crisply and colloquially than has been done before." The translator's notes in John Sturrock's translation (Penguin, 2006), while echoing Mendelsohn on a personal level, found "precedent in the end to be too strong" as "previous translators ... seem all of them to have settled on Fabrizio, and I have done the same" (pp. xxv–xxvi).

== Literary significance ==
While in some respects it is a "romantic thriller", interwoven with intrigue and adventures, the novel is also an exploration of human nature, psychology, and court politics.

The novel is cited as an early example of realism, a stark contrast to the Romantic style popular while Stendhal was writing. It is considered by many authors to be a truly revolutionary work; Honoré de Balzac considered it the most significant novel of his time, Tolstoy was heavily influenced by Stendhal's treatment of the Battle of Waterloo in his depiction of the Battle of Borodino, forming a central part of his novel War and Peace. André Gide described it as the greatest of all French novels, while Henry James ranked it "among the dozen finest novels we possess".

== Criticism ==
Stendhal wrote the book in just 52 days (from November 4, 1838, to December 26 of the same year). As a result, there are some poorly introduced plot elements (such as the poet–bandit–assassin Ferrante who suddenly appears in the story; even the author admits that he should have mentioned Ferrante's relationship to Gina earlier in the story).

== Adaptations ==
- An opera on the subject, with libretto by Armand Lunel and music by Henri Sauguet, was premiered in Paris in 1939.
- The novel was filmed in 1948, directed by Christian-Jaque and starring Gérard Philipe as Fabricio, Maria Casares as Gina Sanseverina, and Renée Faure as Clelia Conti.
- Bernardo Bertolucci claimed to have based his 1964 film Prima della rivoluzione (Before the Revolution) on the novel.
- In 1981, the novel was turned into a TV series, La Certosa di Parma, directed by Mauro Bolognini, an Italian-French-German co-production.
- In 2012, a joint Italian–French TV miniseries La Certosa di Parma was directed by Cinzia Th. Torrini.
