= Hinton Charterhouse =

Village in Somerset, England

Coordinates: 51.3256°N 2.3235°W

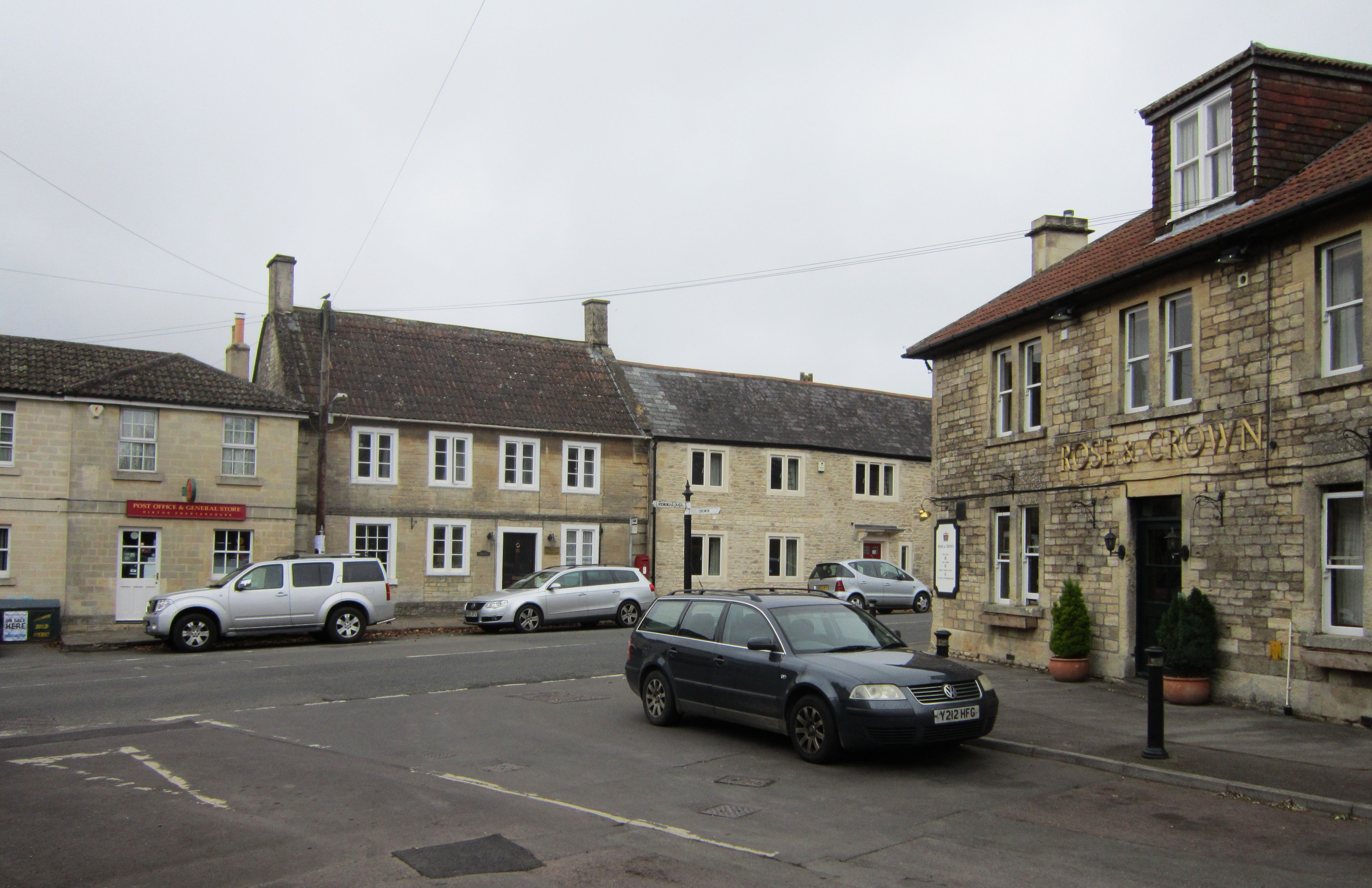
- Pub, post office & general store in village centre

- Location within Somerset
- Population: 515
- OS grid reference: ST775585
- Unitary authority: Bath and North East Somerset
- Ceremonial county: Somerset
- Region: South West
- Country: England
- Sovereign state: United Kingdom
- Post town: BATH
- Postcode district: BA2
- Dialling code: 01225
- Police: Avon and Somerset
- Fire: Avon
- Ambulance: South Western
- UK Parliament: Frome and East Somerset

Hinton Charterhouse is a small village and civil parish in the Bath and North East Somerset unitary authority, Somerset, England. The parish, which includes the village of Midford, has a population of 515.

The village is served by two pubs: the Stag Inn and the Rose & Crown, a vehicle repair garage; Charterhouse Works and the local stores and post office. The village is less than a mile east of the A36 between Bath and Southampton.

The local paper is the occasionally published Hinton Bugler.

== History ==
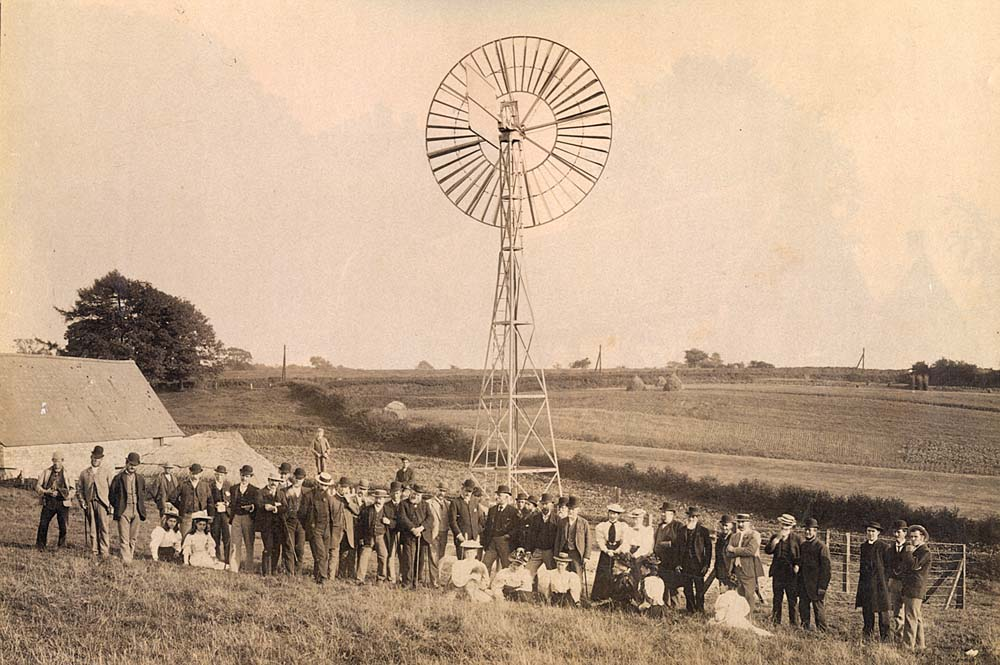
Titt iron wind engine

The parish of Charterhouse Hinton was part of the Wellow Hundred.

The chapter house with library and dovecote above, of the former Carthusian Hinton Priory dates from 1232 and is a Grade I listed building. The priory was founded in 1232 by Ela, Countess of Salisbury, who also founded Lacock Abbey.

Hinton House was built around 1700. It is a Grade II* listed building.

In 1895 a Titt iron wind engine was installed to pump water from a spring by Bath Union Rural District Council.

During the Second World War, GHQ Line ran just to the north of Hinton Charterhouse. At (Hedge) Hog Wood remains of an anti-tank ditch and other trenchworks can still be seen. These rare survivors as well as rather more robust pillboxes were constructed as a part of British anti-invasion preparations.

The Grade II listed former village school is now a private residence.

== Governance ==
The Parish Council has responsibility for local issues, including setting an annual precept (local rate) to cover the council's operating costs and producing annual accounts for public scrutiny. The parish council evaluates local planning applications and works with the local police, district council officers, and Neighbourhood Watch (UK) groups on matters of crime, security, and traffic. The parish council's role also includes initiating projects for the maintenance and repair of parish facilities, such as the village hall or community centre, playing fields and playgrounds, as well as consulting with the district council on the maintenance, repair, and improvement of highways, drainage, footpaths, public transport, and street cleaning. Conservation matters (including trees and listed buildings) and environmental issues are also of interest to the council.

The parish falls within the unitary authority of Bath and North East Somerset which was created in 1996, as established by the Local Government Act 1992. It provides a single tier of local government with responsibility for almost all local government functions within its area including local planning and building control, local roads, council housing, environmental health, markets and fairs, refuse collection, recycling, cemeteries, crematoria, leisure services, parks, and tourism. It is also responsible for education, social services, libraries, main roads, public transport, trading standards, waste disposal and strategic planning, although fire, police and ambulance services are provided jointly with other authorities through the Avon Fire and Rescue Service, Avon and Somerset Constabulary and the Great Western Ambulance Service.

Bath and North East Somerset's area covers part of the ceremonial county of Somerset but it is administered independently of the non-metropolitan county. Its administrative headquarters is in Bath. Between 1 April 1974 and 1 April 1996, it was the Wansdyke district and the City of Bath of the county of Avon. Before 1974 that the parish was part of the Bathavon Rural District.

The parish is represented in the House of Commons of the Parliament of the United Kingdom as part of Frome and East Somerset. It elects one Member of Parliament (MP) by the first past the post system of election.

== Geography ==
Hinton Charterhouse Field is a 0.32 hectare biological Site of Special Scientific Interest (SSSI). and Hinton Charterhouse Pit is a 0.4 hectare geological Site of Special Scientific Interest.

== Religious sites ==
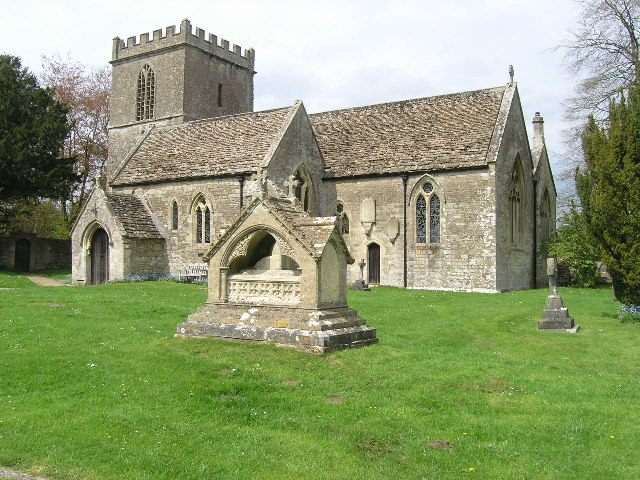
Church of St John the Baptist

The Church of St John the Baptist dates from the 12th century and is Grade II* listed.

== See also ==
- Hinton (place name)
