= Hinton Charterhouse Pit =

- Site of Special Scientific Interest
- Location within Somerset
- Location of Hinton Charterhouse Pit.
- Area of search: Avon
- Grid reference: ST772573
- Coordinates: 51.31435°N 2.32852°W
- Interest: Geological
- Area: 0.4 hectares (0.0040 km^{2}; 0.0015 sq mi)
- Notification date: 1971

Hinton Charterhouse Pit (grid reference ST772573) is a 0.4 hectare geological Site of Special Scientific Interest near the village of Hinton Charterhouse, Bath and North East Somerset, notified in 1971.

The Hinton Sands, where a sparse bivalve fauna has been found, is an unusual sandy facies developed in the middle of the Forest Marble Jurassic Formation. This rock unit has strong associations with William Smith, who used the name Hinton Sands for the facies early in the 19th century.
