= Certosa di Parma =

Church building in Parma, Italy

Coordinates: 44.8025°N 10.3667°E

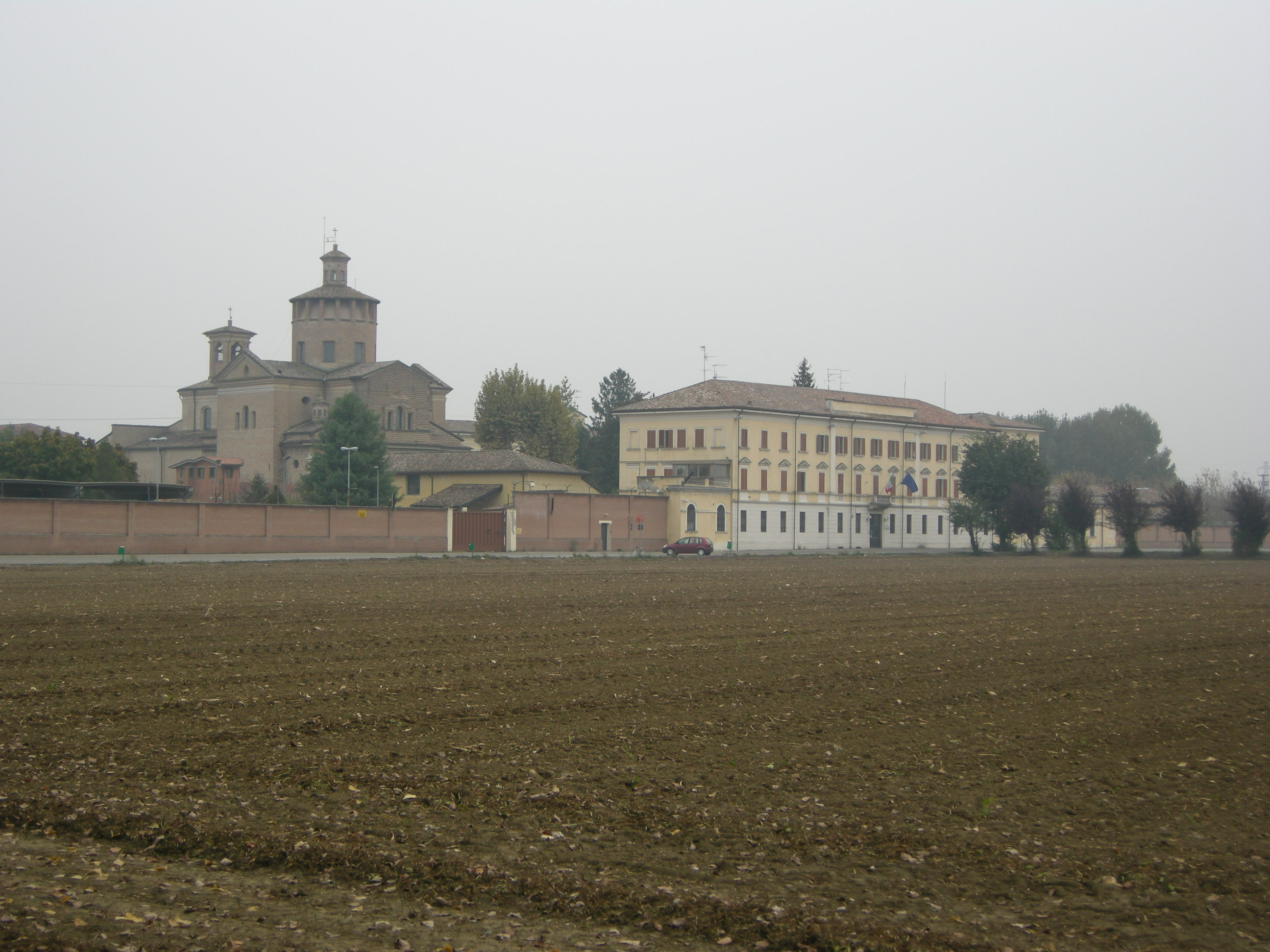
Certosa di Parma

The Certosa di Parma (Certosa di San Girolamo) is a former Carthusian Monastery located in the outskirts of Parma.

The first Carthusian monastery at the site was constructed from 1285 to 1304, by the initiative of the archbishop of Spoleto, Rolando Taverna. Little, if any, remains of that structure, the minor cloister dates from the 15th century. At the site between 1673 and 1722, a new Baroque monastery, cloister and church were built based on designs by Francesco Pescaroli. In 1769, the monastery was suppressed and the site became used for manufacture of cigars, and became the "Fabbrica Ducale dei Tabacchi di Parma". In 1900, it became a reformatory for juvenile offenders. In 1975, it acquired its present function as a school for prison police (Scuola di Formazione e Aggiornamento della Polizia Penitenziaria).

The church, dedicated to St. Jerome, has works and frescoes by Francesco Pescaroli, Alessandro Baratta, Gian Battista Natali, and Ilario Spolverini.

The monastery was suppressed at the time when Stendhal's novel The Charterhouse of Parma was written.

== Gallery ==
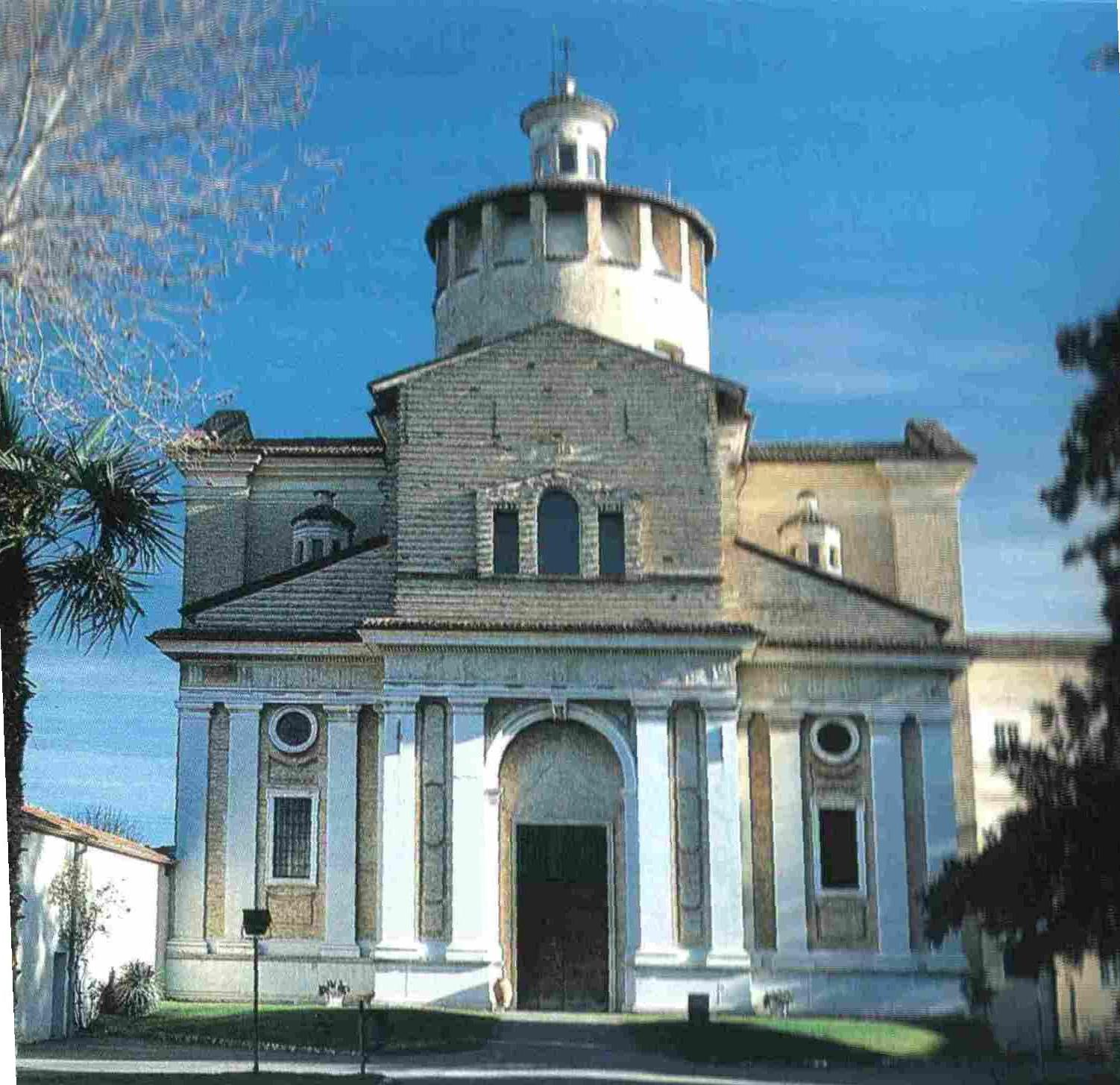
Facade of the church of St Jerome

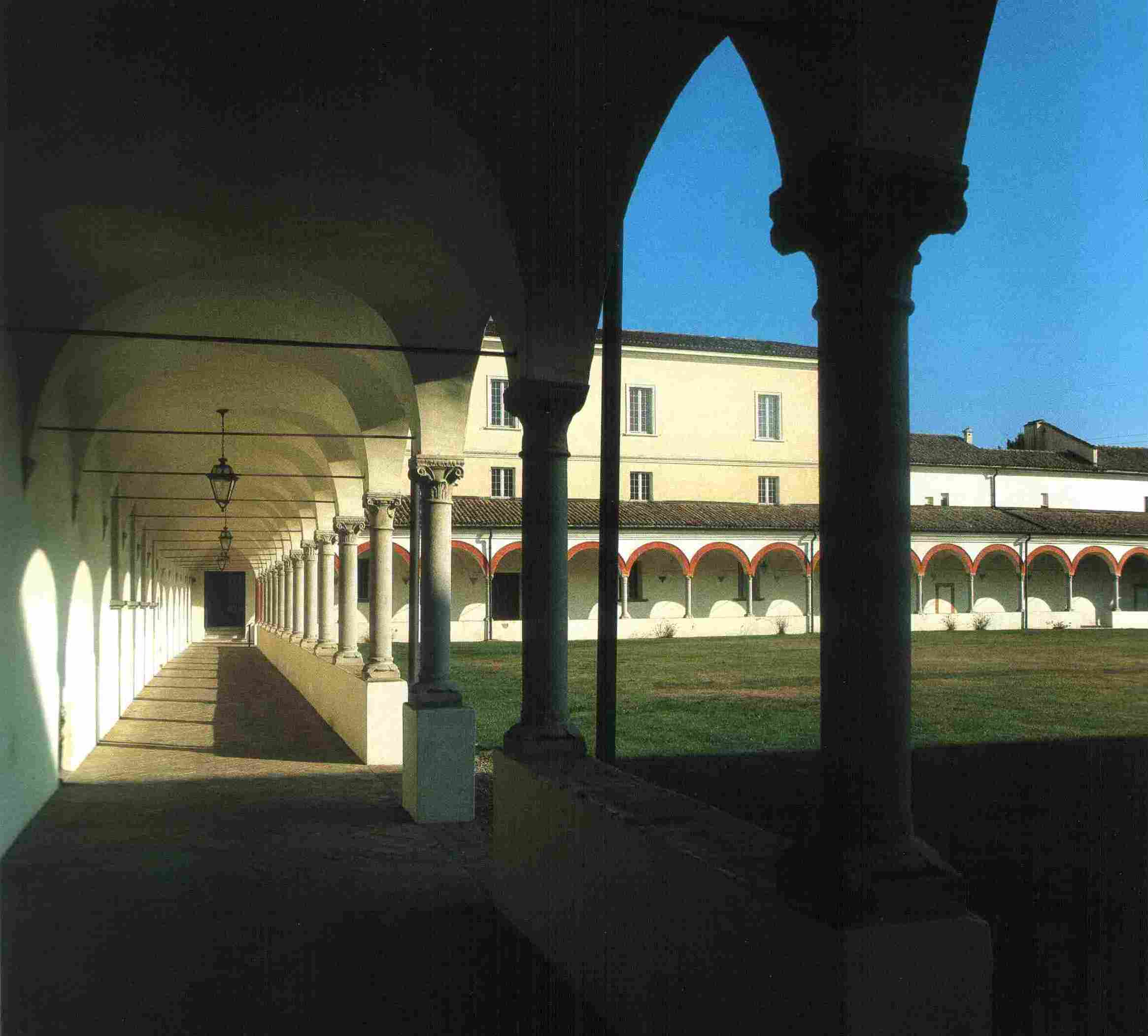
Major cloister

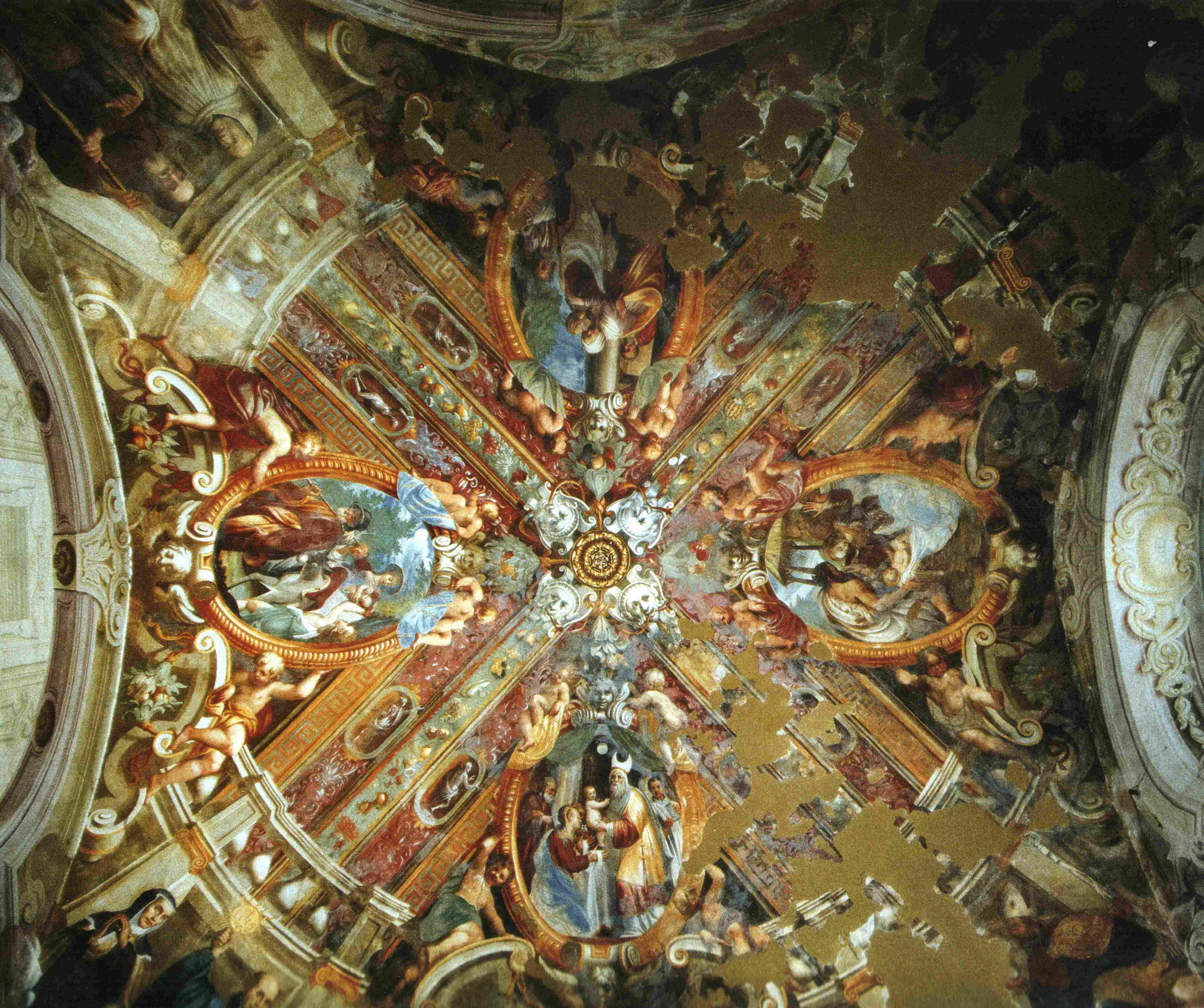
Frescoed ceiling of sacristy
