= Chartreuse (dish) =

French dish cooked in a mould

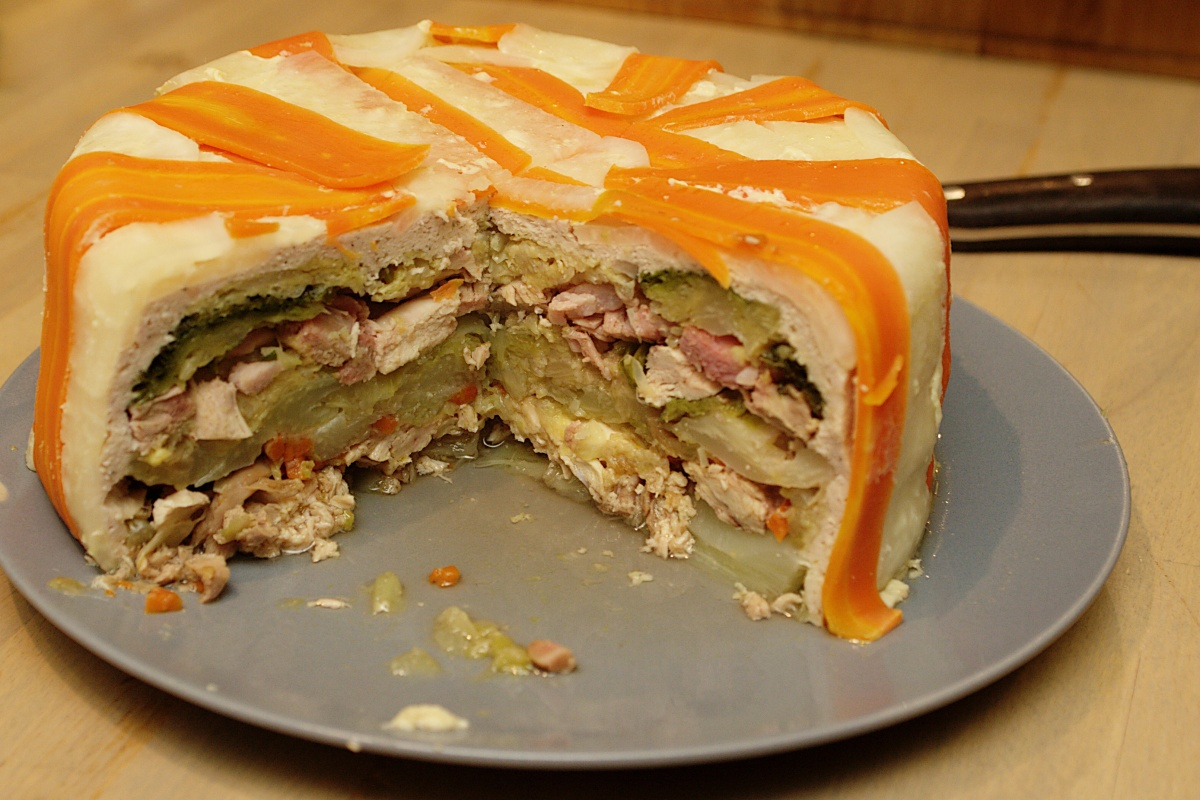
- A chartreuse of Drôme guineafowl, cut to reveal the internal layers.
- Place of origin: France
- Main ingredients: Vegetables, meat

A chartreuse is a French dish comprising vegetables such as cabbage, chicory or carrot (and sometimes also meat) that are wrapped tightly in a decorative layer of salad or vegetable leaves and cooked within a dome mould. Variations of the dish have been in existence since at least the eighteenth century.

In classic French cuisine it is cooked in a bain-marie and served hot. Chef Marie-Antoine Careme described Chartreuse as the "queen of entrees". Nowadays it is usually a dish of partridge with cabbage and is called chartreuse of partridge.

It was the non-meat diet of the monastic order of Carthusians that had been founded at Chartreuse that gave the dish its name as, originally, it was made just with vegetables. The appearance of the chartreuse may be varied according to the colours, cut, and arrangement of the external vegetables.
