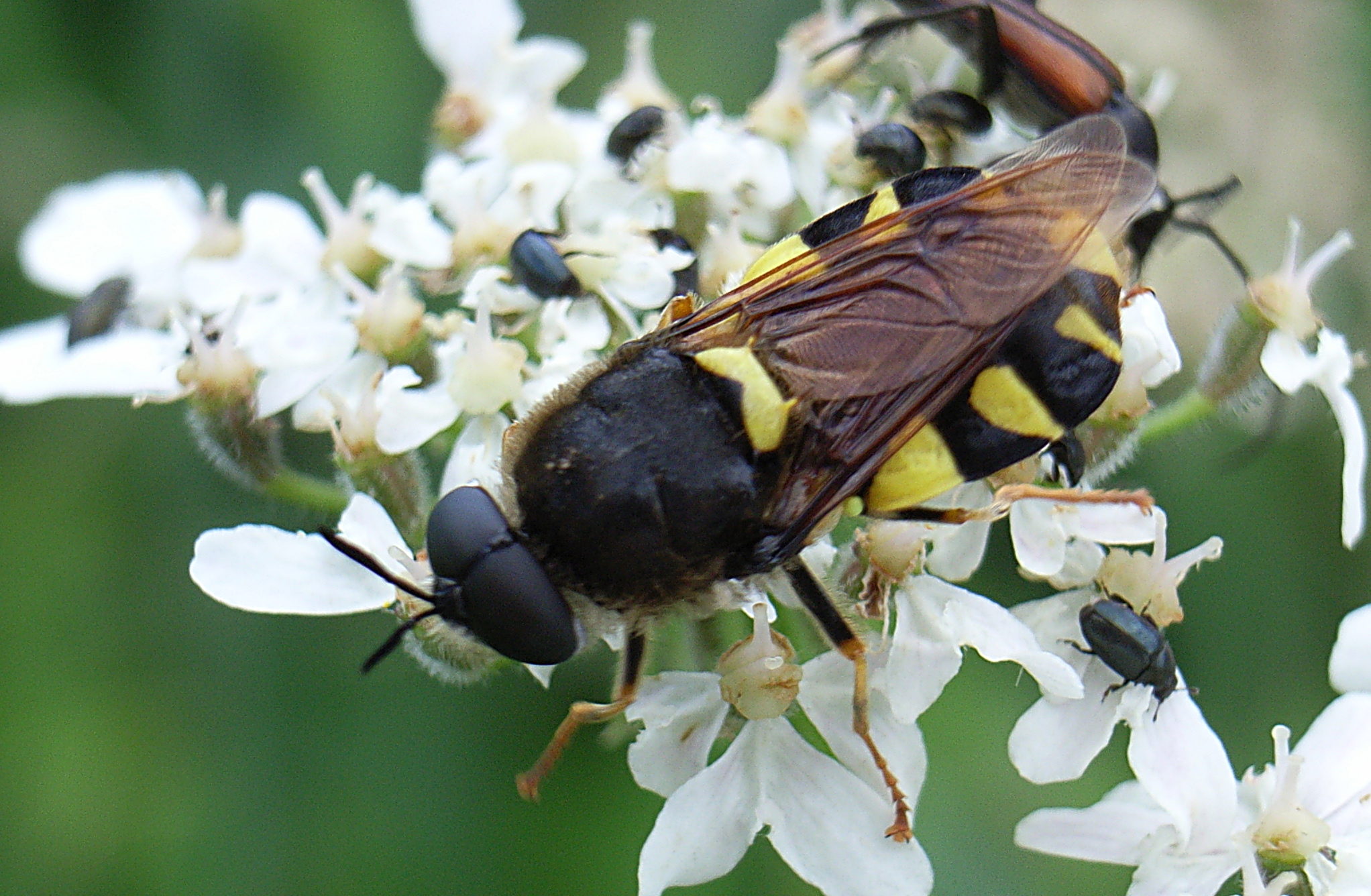
- Stratiomys chamaeleon

Scientific classification
- Kingdom: Animalia
- Phylum: Arthropoda
- Clade: Pancrustacea
- Class: Insecta
- Order: Diptera
- Family: Stratiomyidae
- Subfamily: Stratiomyinae
- Tribe: Stratiomyini
- Genus: Stratiomys; Geoffroy, 1762

Type species
- Musca chamaeleon Linnaeus, 1758

Synonyms
- Amauromyia Pleske, 1922; Diademomyia Pleske, 1922; Electrolophidion Pleske, 1922; Eustratiomyia Pleske, 1922; Hemipyrrhoceromyia Pleske, 1922; Hirtea Scopoli, 1763; Holopyrrhoceromyia Pleske, 1922; Hoplomyia Zeller, 1842; Hoptomyia Loew, 1846; Laternigera Pleske, 1922; Metastratiomyia Pleske, 1922; Oreomyia Pleske, 1922; Parastratiomyia Pleske, 1922; Poecilothorax Pleske, 1922; Ssratiomys Panzer, 1792; Stereoxantha Pleske, 1922; Stiatiomyia Pleske, 1922; Strariomyia Shi, 1992; Stratiomia Hunter, 1900; Stratiomicrodon Papavero, 1998; Stratiomiis Scopoli, 1777; Stratiomis Walckenaer, 1802; Stratiomya Schiner, 1868; Stratiomyia Agassiz, 1846; Stratiomyia Macquart, 1838; Stratiomyis Ôuchi, 1940; Stratiomyx Rossi, 1794; Stratiotomyia Arribálzaga, 1883; Stratiotomyia Rye, 1879; Stratioyms Ôuchi, 1940; Stratomyia Bigot, 1887; Stratyomis Batsch, 1789; Stratyomys Gray, 1832; Strutiomys Walker, 1864; Thyreodonta Bezzi, 1903; Thyreodonta Marschall, 1873; Thyreodontha Rondani, 1863

= Stratiomys =

Genus of flies

Stratiomys is a genus of flies in the family Stratiomyidae.

== Species ==
- Stratiomys adelpha Steyskal, 1952
- Stratiomys annectens James, 1941
- Stratiomys apicalis Walker, 1854
- Stratiomys approximata Brunetti, 1923
- Stratiomys armeniaca Bigot, 1879
- Stratiomys badius Walker, 1849
- Stratiomys barca Walker, 1849
- Stratiomys browni Curran, 1927
- Stratiomys canadensis Walker, 1854
- Stratiomys cenisia Meigen, 1822
- Stratiomys chamaeleon (Linnaeus, 1758)
- Stratiomys concinna Meigen, 1822
- Stratiomys conica Fabricius, 1805
- Stratiomys constricta Walker, 1860
- Stratiomys currani James, 1932
- Stratiomys diademata Bigot, 1887
- Stratiomys equestris Meigen, 1835
- Stratiomys fenestrata Gerstaecker, 1857
- Stratiomys floridensis Steyskal, 1952
- Stratiomys heberti Oustalet, 1870
- Stratiomys hirsutissima James, 1932
- Stratiomys hulli Steyskal, 1952
- Stratiomys jamesi Steyskal, 1952
- Stratiomys japonica Wulp, 1885
- Stratiomys laetimaculata (Ôuchi, 1938)
- Stratiomys laevifrons (Loew, 1854)
- Stratiomys leucopsis Wiedemann, 1830
- Stratiomys longicornis (Scopoli, 1763)
- Stratiomys longifrons Rondani, 1848
- Stratiomys meigenii Wiedemann, 1830
- Stratiomys melanopsis Wiedemann, 1830
- Stratiomys nevadae Bigot, 1887
- Stratiomys nigrifrons Walker, 1849
- Stratiomys norma Wiedemann, 1830
- Stratiomys nymphis Walker, 1849
- Stratiomys ohioensis Steyskal, 1952
- Stratiomys pallipes Fabricius, 1781
- Stratiomys pellucida Rondani, 1848
- Stratiomys pentadiscalia Statz, 1940
- Stratiomys portschinskyana Nartshuk & Rozkošný, 1984
- Stratiomys potamida Meigen, 1822
- Stratiomys reducta Nerudova, Kovac & Rozkošný, 2007
- Stratiomys singularia (Harris, 1778)
- Stratiomys tularensis James, 1957
- Stratiomys validicornis (Loew, 1854)
- Stratiomys velutina Bigot, 1879
- Stratiomys ventralis Loew, 1847
- Stratiomys virens Wiedemann, 1830
