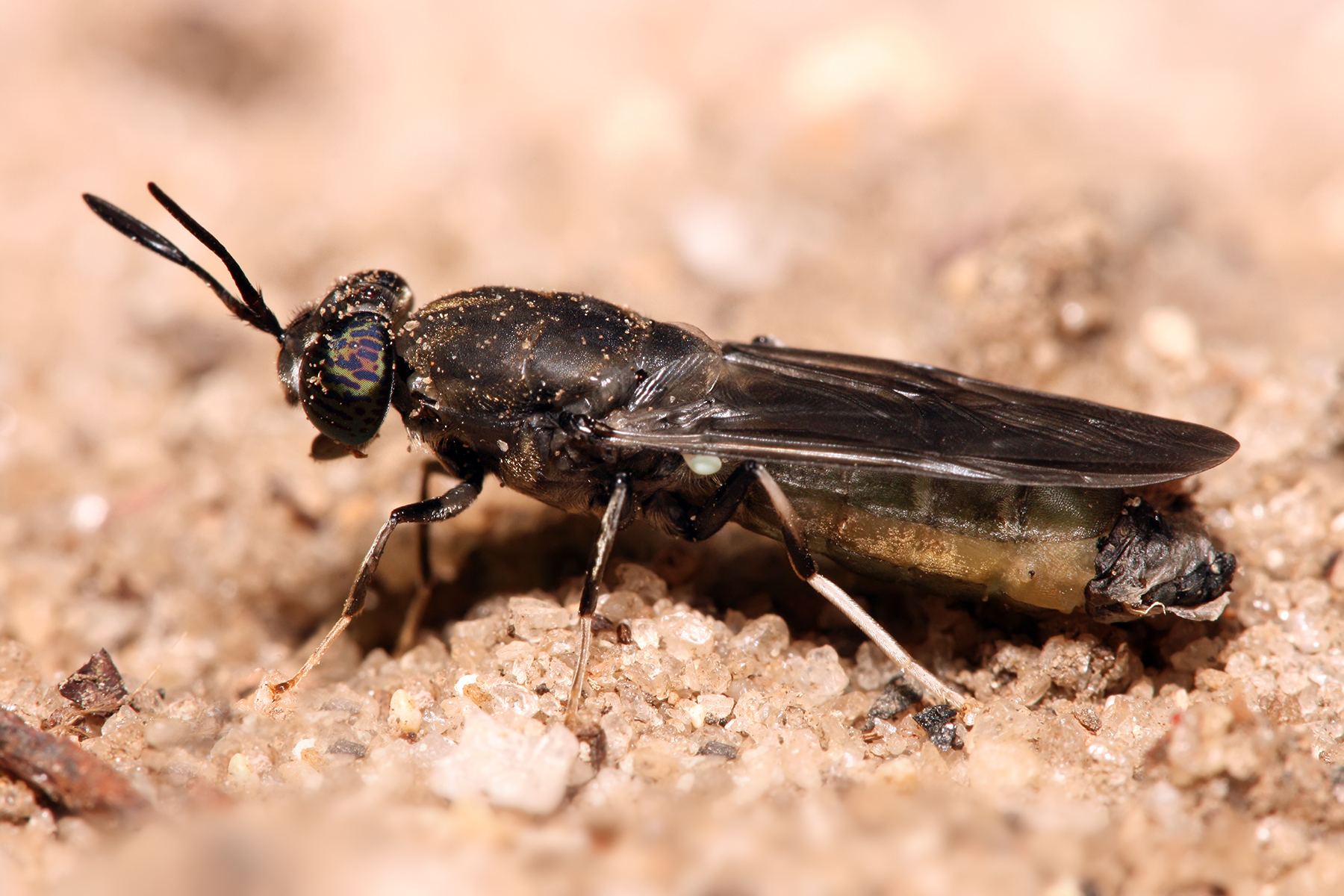
- Hermetia illucens
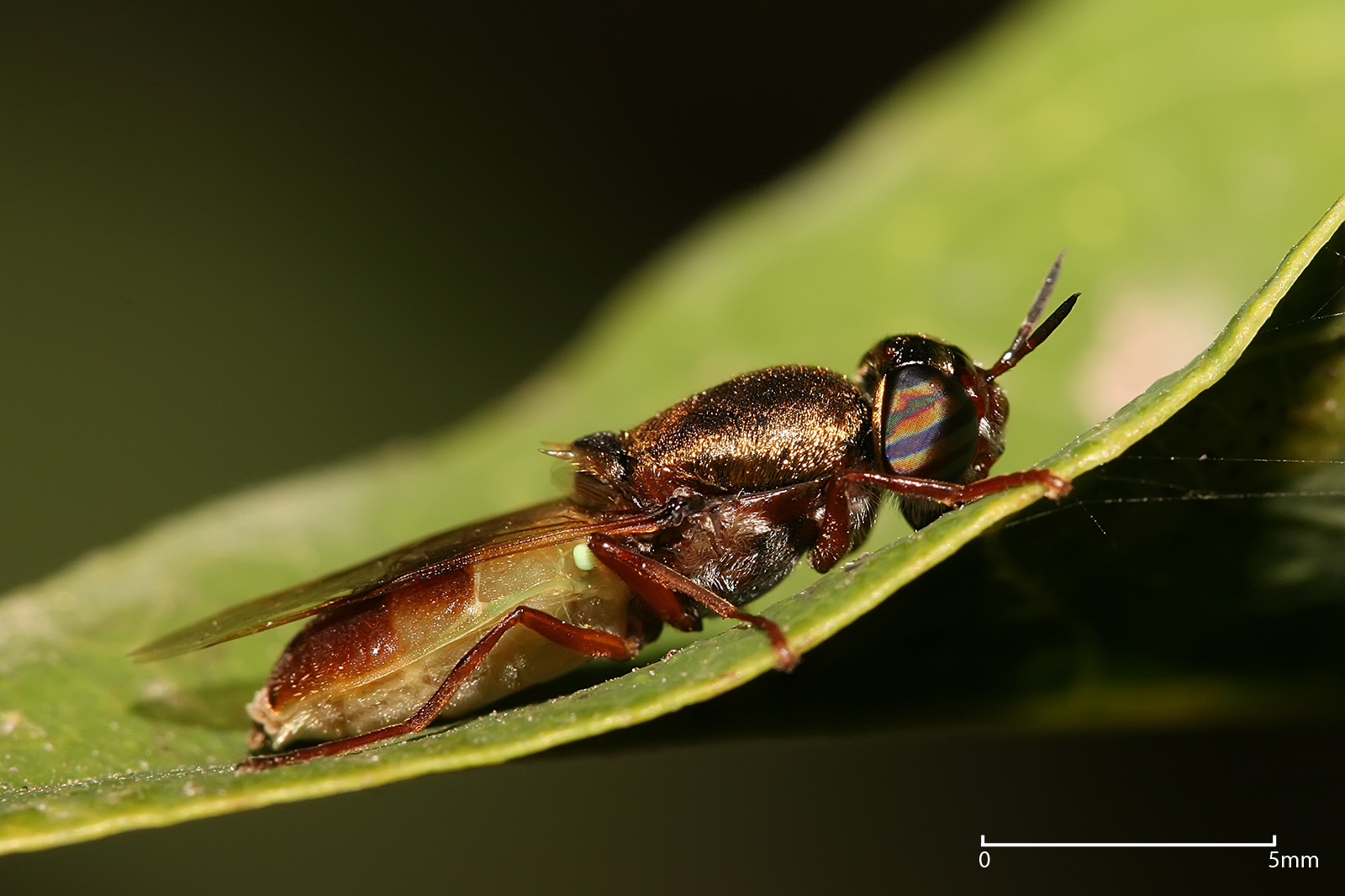
- Odontomyia sp.

Scientific classification
- Kingdom: Animalia
- Phylum: Arthropoda
- Clade: Pancrustacea
- Class: Insecta
- Order: Diptera
- Suborder: Brachycera
- Infraorder: Stratiomyomorpha
- Superfamily: Stratiomyoidea
- Family: Stratiomyidae; Latreille, 1802

Subfamilies
- Antissinae; Beridinae; Chiromyzinae; Chrysochlorininae; Clitellariinae; Hermetiinae; Nemotelinae; Pachygastrinae; Parhadrestiinae; Raphiocerinae; Sarginae; Stratiomyinae

= Stratiomyidae =

Soldier flies Temporal range: Early Cretaceous – Recent

Family of flies

The soldier flies (Stratiomyidae, sometimes misspelled as Stratiomyiidae, from Greek στρατιώτης - soldier; μυια - fly) are a family of flies (historically placed in the now-obsolete group Orthorrhapha). The family contains over 2,700 species in over 380 extant genera worldwide. Larvae are found in a wide array of locations, mostly in wetlands, damp places in soil, sod, under bark, in animal excrement, and in decaying organic matter. Adults are found near larval habitats. They are diverse in size and shape, though they commonly are partly or wholly metallic green, or somewhat wasplike mimics, marked with black and yellow or green and sometimes metallic. They are often rather inactive flies which typically rest with their wings placed one above the other over the abdomen.

The Stratiomyinae are a subfamily that tend to have an affinity to aquatic environments.

== Etymology ==
In English, the Stratiomidi are commonly called soldier flies, in German Waffenfliegen ("armed flies"). In the Italian language, Duméril (1832) used the common names term stratiomidi and mosche armate in the Dizionario delle Scienze Naturali (Dictionary of Natural Sciences). The name might originate from thoracic spines of adults that resemble armor or striped larvae that resemble uniformed soldiers.

== Characteristics ==
These flies range from very small to large, 3 to 20 mm long. They have antennae in three segments, with the terminal segment annulated. Ocelli are present; the lower orbital bristles are absent. The postvertical orbital bristles are absent, as are the vibrissae. As for the mouthparts, the proboscis is short and not piercing; the maxillary palps are mono- or bisegmented. The wings have either a small discal cell, or the discal cell is absent. No subapical cell is seen, and a closed anal cell is present. The costa does not extend around the entire wing. The subcosta reaches the costa independently of vein 1, or joins vein 1 close to where it joins the costa. The leading-edge veins are often markedly stronger than the rest; vein 6 is present and reaches the wing margin, whereas vein 7 is present and does not reach the wing margin. The tibiae are without spurs.

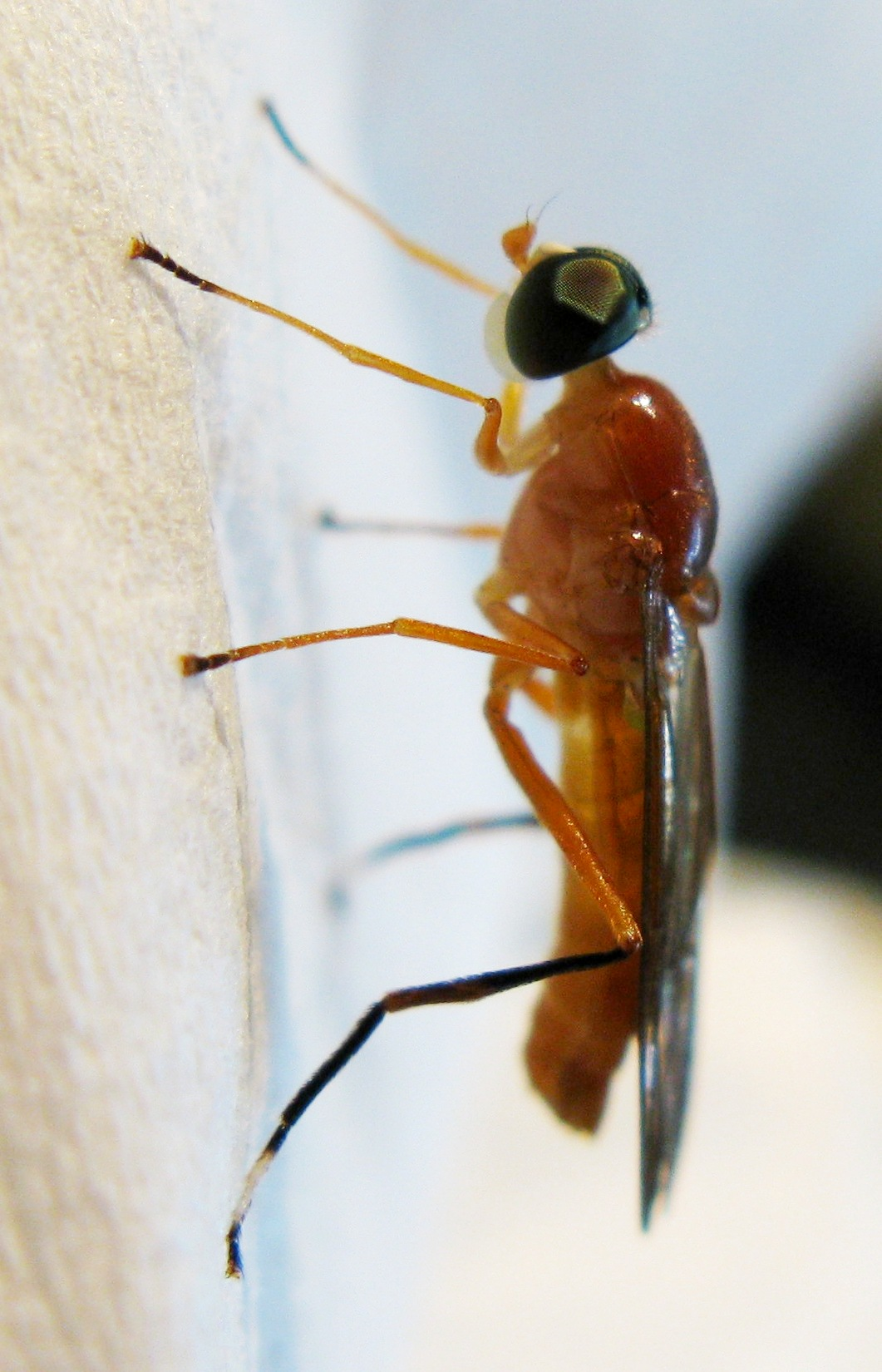
P. elongatus lateral view

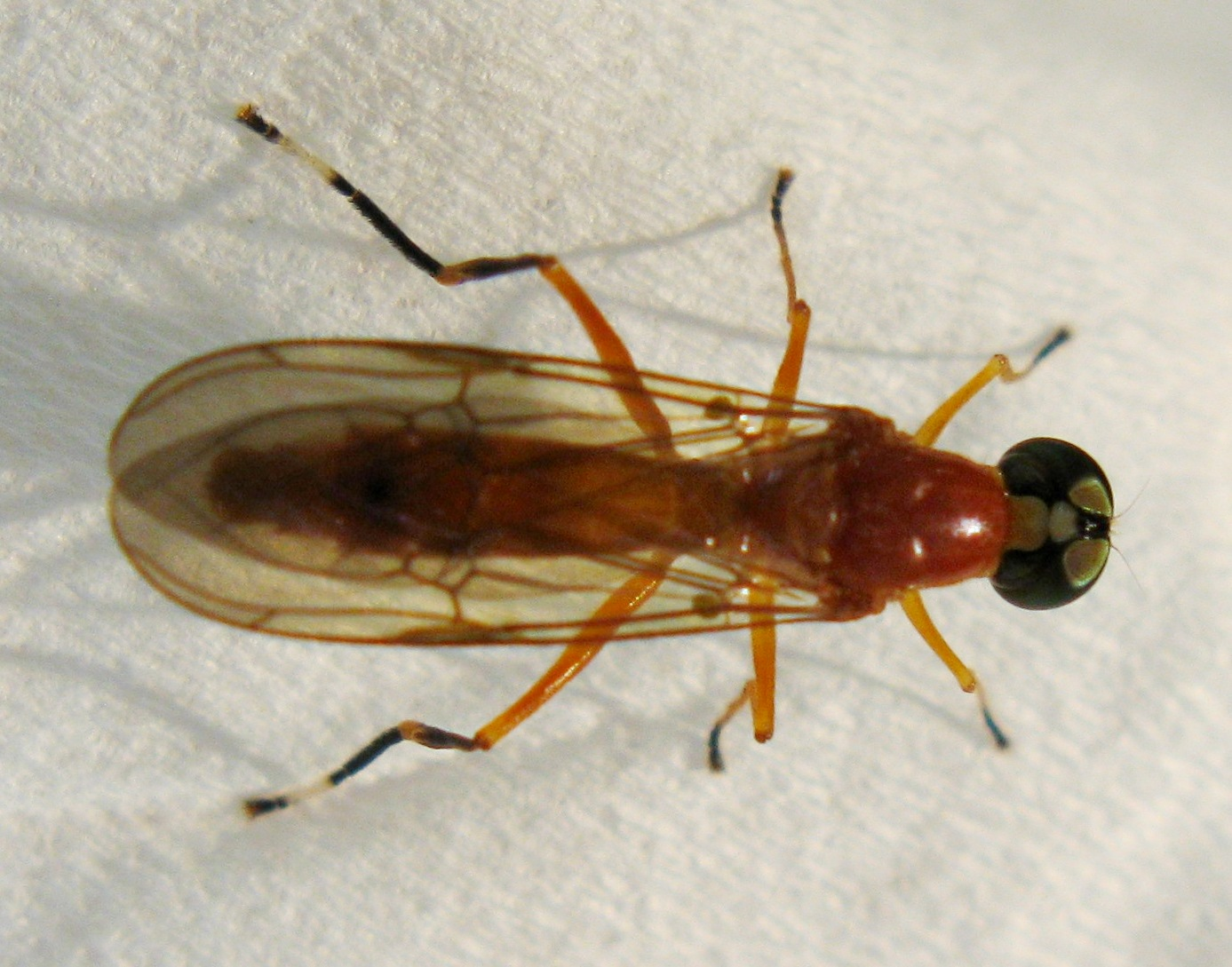
P. elongatus Dorsal view

Stratiomyidae wing veins

== Larvae and pupae ==
Larvae may be either aquatic or terrestrial. In regards to feeding, they may be saprophagous, mycophagous, or predatory. The larvae are apodous and eucephalic and cylindrical-fusiform, depressed dorsoventrally and distinctly segmented. The size of the mature larva is variable, depending on the species, from less than 1 cm in length up to 5 cm. The head is much narrower than the thorax and partially sunken into it. The integument is strongly sclerotized with the cuticle containing inclusions of calcium carbonate with hexagonal crystals which form a characteristic microsculpture. In aquatic species, the last urite is thin and more or less elongated forming a breathing tube, which ends with a tuft of waterproofing bristles. It is used to draw air from the surface, with the larva remaining submerged.

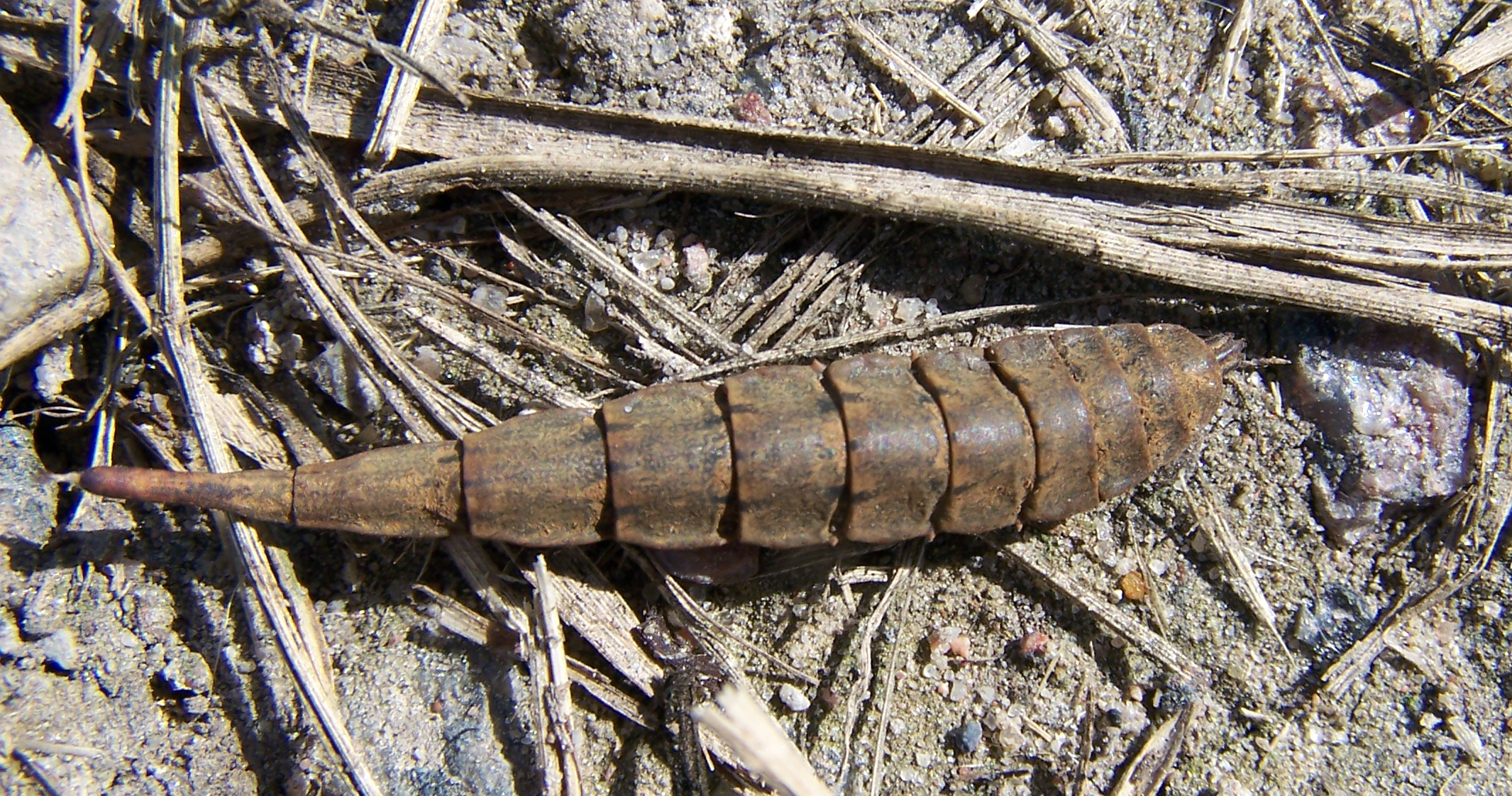
Larva of Stratiomys longicornis

Larva of Stratiomys longicornis (video)

Larva of Oplodontha viridula (video)

The pupa develops inside the exuvia of the last larval stage, a feature common to all Stratiomyomorpha. The pupation within the larval exuvia constitutes a case of evolutionary convergence with Cyclorrhapha, in which group is the formation of a true puparium.

== Biology ==
The larvae of Stratiomyidae are characterized by a wide variety of behaviours and habitats. They are mainly scavengers, but aquatic species also feed on algae. Less frequently, they may be predators or herbivores. The aquatic larvae are sometimes characterized by particularly specific habitat requirements. For example, several species colonize rocks covered by a thin layer of water (hygropetric); others are found in brackish water, and some in thermal springs. In general, though, Stratiomyidae larvae colonize stagnant waters or rivers near the shores, seeking the richest vegetation, algae, and debris.

Terrestrial larvae are found in organic substrates: in decomposing vegetable matter and animal excreta, in moist soils and litter, under the bark of trees, etc. Inopus rubriceps (Macquart), the sugarcane soldier fly, is a pest: the larvae attack the roots of sugarcane in Australia.

Adults visit flowers to feed on the sugar-containing nectar, or else do not feed at all, dedicating their short lives to reproduction. Unlike other dipterous scavengers, adults of Stratiomyidae do not have relationships with the growth substrate of the larvae, except for oviposition.

Larval development takes place with a variable number of moults; depending on the species, up to 10 larval stages occur. Particularly well known is the postembryonic development of Hermetia illucens, whose larvae develop through six stages.

Species of this fly may travel along with members of Polybioides raphigastra (a wasp species) through the practice of mimicry.

== Systematics ==
The Stratiomyidae are closely related to the family of Xylomyidae, with which they share 10 synapomorphies, and they form a monophyletic clade with the family of Pantophthalmidae with which they share 5 synapomorphies.

- Stratiomyomorpha
  - - Stratiomyidae
    - Xylomyidae
  - Pantophthalmidae
