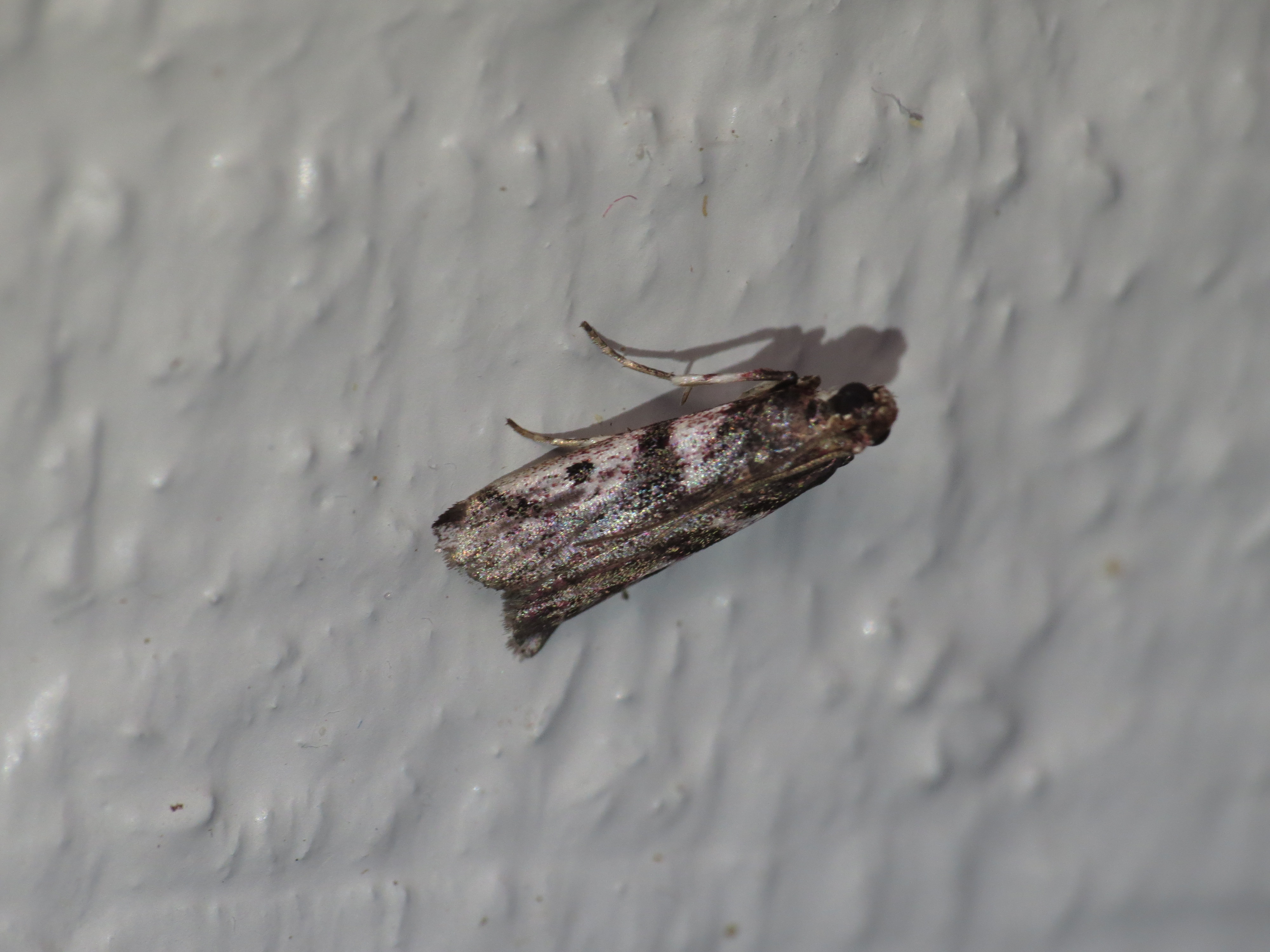
- Aurana actiosella

Scientific classification
- Kingdom: Animalia
- Phylum: Arthropoda
- Class: Insecta
- Order: Lepidoptera
- Family: Pyralidae
- Subfamily: Phycitinae
- Tribe: Phycitini
- Genus: Aurana; Walker, 1863

Type species
- Aurana actiosella Walker, 1863

Synonyms
- Longiculcita Roesler, 1975

= Aurana =

Genus of moths

Aurana is a genus of snout moths. It was erected by Francis Walker in 1863 and is known from Japan and Australia.

== Taxonomy ==
Some authors list the genus as a synonym of Pempelia.

== Species ==
- Aurana actiosella Walker, 1863
- Aurana vinaceella (Inoue, 1963)
