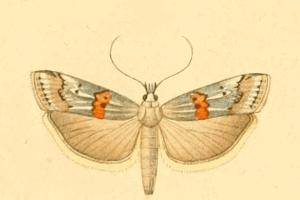

Scientific classification
- Domain: Eukaryota
- Kingdom: Animalia
- Phylum: Arthropoda
- Class: Insecta
- Order: Lepidoptera
- Family: Pyralidae
- Genus: Pempelia
- Species: P. alpigenella

Binomial name
- Pempelia alpigenella (Duponchel, 1836)

Synonyms
- Phycis alpigenella Duponchel, 1836

= Pempelia alpigenella =

Species of moth

Pempelia alpigenella is a species of snout moth. It is found in France, Italy, Albania, North Macedonia, Bulgaria, Greece, Ukraine and Russia.
