= Pempelia lundbladi =

Scientific classification
- Domain: Eukaryota
- Kingdom: Animalia
- Phylum: Arthropoda
- Class: Insecta
- Order: Lepidoptera
- Family: Pyralidae
- Genus: Pempelia
- Species: P. lundbladi

Binomial name
- Pempelia lundbladi Rebel, 1939

Species of moth

Pempelia lundbladi is a species of snout moth. It is found on Madeira.
