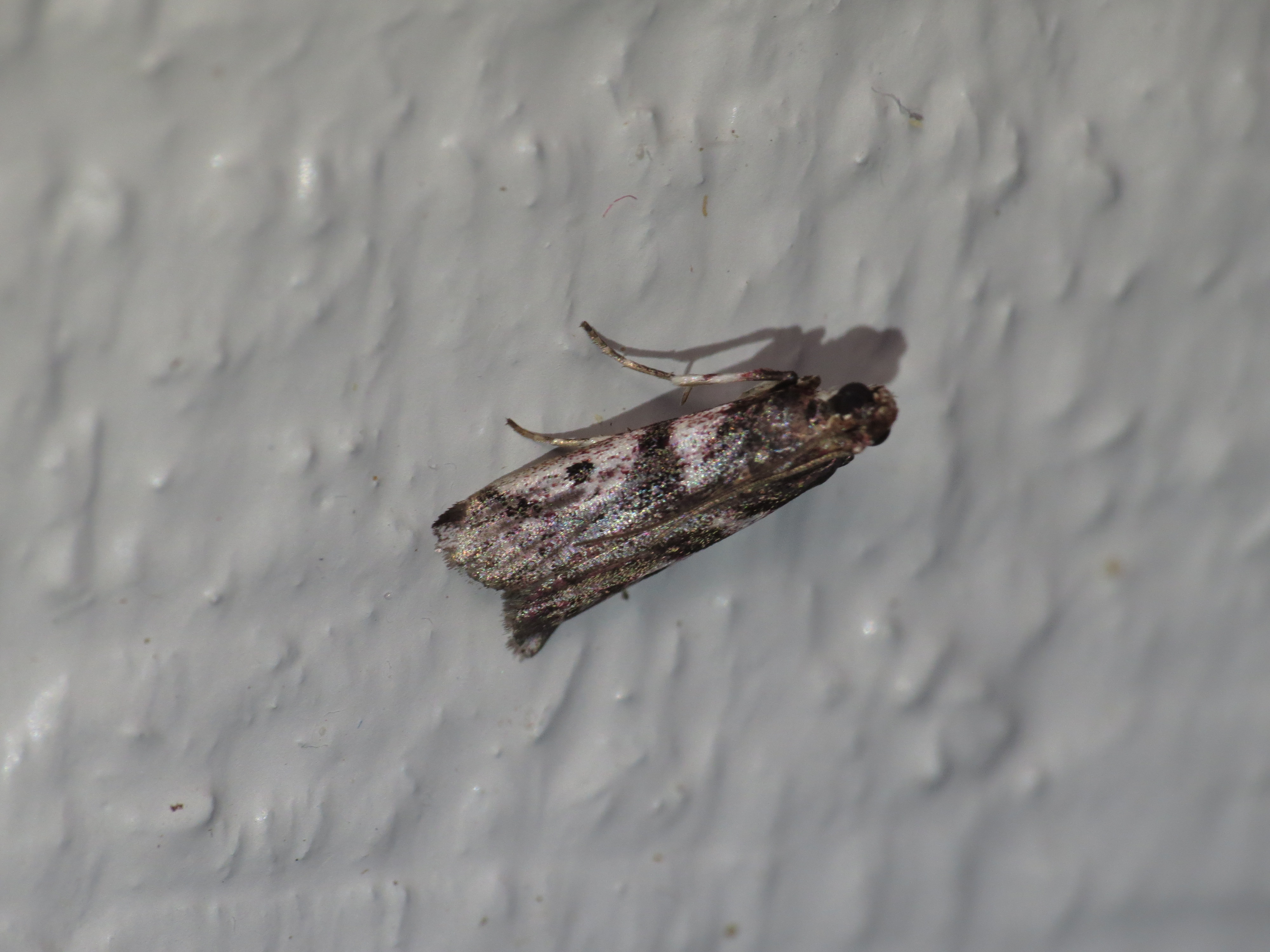
- Aurana actiosella Walker, 1863, to actinic light, Clump Point, Mission Beach, QLD, November 2014

Scientific classification
- Kingdom: Animalia
- Phylum: Arthropoda
- Class: Insecta
- Order: Lepidoptera
- Family: Pyralidae
- Genus: Aurana
- Species: A. actiosella

Binomial name
- Aurana actiosella Walker, 1863

Synonyms
- Nephopteryx lentalis Swinhoe, 1885; Pempelia actiosella

= Aurana actiosella =

Species of moth

Aurana actiosella is a species of snout moth in the genus Aurana. It was described by Francis Walker in 1863 and is found in Australia.
