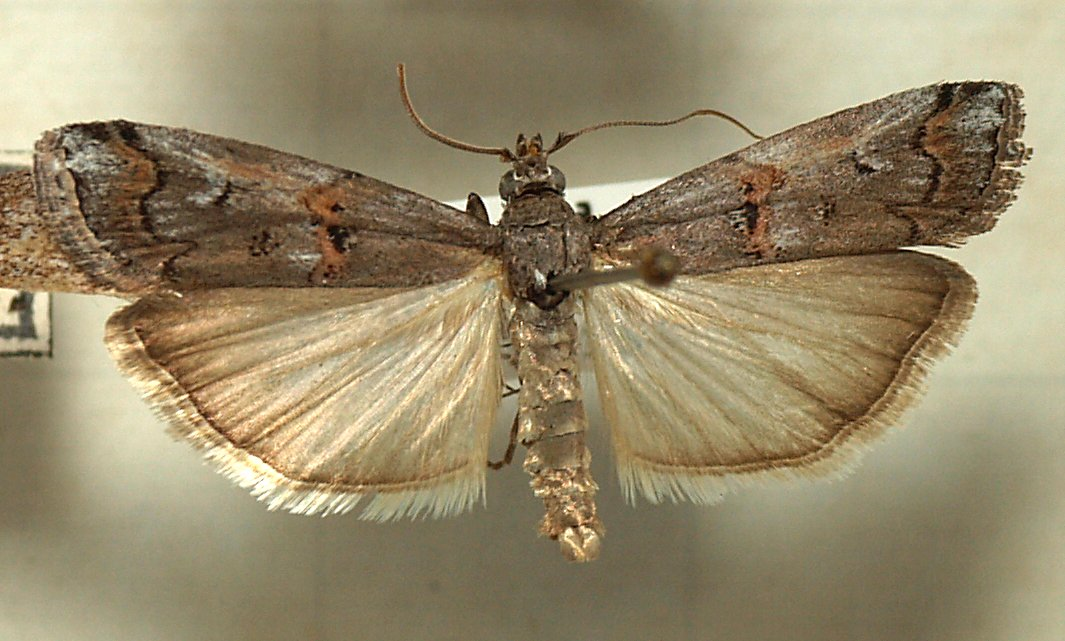

Scientific classification
- Kingdom: Animalia
- Phylum: Arthropoda
- Clade: Pancrustacea
- Class: Insecta
- Order: Lepidoptera
- Family: Pyralidae
- Genus: Pempelia
- Species: P. palumbella

Binomial name
- Pempelia palumbella (Denis & Schiffermüller, 1775)

Synonyms
- Tinea palumbella Denis & Schiffermüller, 1775; Homoeosoma cinerea Humphreys & Westwood, 1841; Salebria palumbella liviella Zerny, 1927; Salebria palumbella ragonoti Turati, 1923; Tinea contubernella Hübner, 1796

= Pempelia palumbella =

Species of moth

Pempelia palumbella is a moth of the family Pyralidae. It is found in Europe.

The wingspan is 25–27 millimetres (0.98–1.06 in). The forewings are violet-brown, more or less sprinkled with whitish and dark fuscous, suffused with whitish towards costa between lines and on apex; first and second lines pale red-brownish, internally black-edged, first angulated, preceded by a small spot of blackish raised scales on fold, second twice indented; a rather oblique black discal mark. The hindwings are light fuscous, darker terminally. The larva is dark greenish-grey, reddish-tinged; dorsal line brownish, pale-edged; subdorsal double, lighter brownish; head reddish brown: in tubular webs on Erica and Polygala

The moth flies in one generation from May to September.

The caterpillars feed on calluna, ericaceae species, thyme and polygalaceae species.

== Notes ==
- The flight season refers to Belgium and the Netherlands. This may vary in other parts of the range.
