= Pempelia cirtensis =

Scientific classification
- Kingdom: Animalia
- Phylum: Arthropoda
- Class: Insecta
- Order: Lepidoptera
- Family: Pyralidae
- Genus: Pempelia
- Species: P. cirtensis

Binomial name
- Pempelia cirtensis (Ragonot, 1890)

Synonyms
- Salebria cirtensis Ragonot, 1890; Salebria cirtensis commagensis Osthelder, 1940

Species of moth

Pempelia cirtensis is a species of snout moth. It is found on Cyprus, Turkey, Israel and North Africa, including Algeria.
