= Genetically modified sugarcane =

A genetically modified sugarcane (GM sugarcane) is a sugarcane whose genetic material has been altered through genetic engineering techniques, conferring desirable traits such as insect resistance and tolerance to drought and herbicides. Brazil became the first country to approve the commercial cultivation of genetically modified sugarcane in 2017; the cane received genes that provide resistance to the sugarcane borer. In the 2022/23 harvest, the area cultivated with GM sugarcane in Brazil nearly doubled, reaching 70,000 hectares. Still, this number represents only a small fraction of the country's total sugarcane fields, which occupy approximately 8.3 million hectares. This technology has benefited farmers by providing greater profitability, yield, and reduced pesticide use.

There is a scientific consensus that currently available food derived from GM crops poses no greater risk to human health than conventional food, but that each GM food needs to be tested on a case-by-case basis before introduction. Nonetheless, members of the public are much less likely than scientists to perceive GM foods as safe. The legal and regulatory status of GM foods varies by country, with some nations banning or restricting them, and others permitting them with widely differing degrees of regulation.

Some countries import refined sugar derived from these genetically modified crops; the refined product is considered indistinguishable from conventional sugar.

== Examples of transgenic sugarcane ==
=== Bt Sugarcane ===
Brazil was the first country to approve, in 2017, the commercialization of a genetically modified sugarcane, developed by the Centro de Tecnologia Canavieira (Sugarcane Technology Center) (CTC), registered as CTC20Bt. This variety received the cry1Ab gene, responsible for producing the toxin from the bacterium Bacillus thuringiensis (Bt)— already used in other genetically modified crops, such as soybean and maize/corn — conferring resistance to insects, especially the sugarcane borer. GM sugarcane varieties approved in Brazil include: CTC20Bt, CTC9001Bt, CTC9003Bt, CTC7515Bt, CTC579Bt, and CTC9005Bt. Although all these Bt varieties share the trait of resistance to the sugarcane borer, differences in productivity, harvest cycle, and adaptation to specific soil types allow producers to choose the best variety for their farms.

=== BtRR Sugarcane ===
BtRR sugarcane is a variety of sugarcane that combines two genetically modified traits: resistance to the sugarcane borer and tolerance to the herbicide glyphosate. The technology was developed in partnership between Embrapa and the startup PangeiaBiotech. The cane expresses a version of the enzyme 5-enolpyruvylshikimate-3-phosphate synthase (EPSPS), associated with the synthesis of the essential amino acids phenylalanine, tyrosine, and tryptophan, from the CP4 strain of the bacterium Agrobacterium tumefaciens, which is not inhibited by glyphosate, combined with a gene that produces two different Cry insecticidal proteins from the bacterium Bacillus thuringiensis. This variety has not yet received approval for commercial cultivation from Brazilian National Technical Biosafety Commission (CTNBio), although it has been authorized for field testing.

=== NXI Sugarcane ===
Indonesia approved a genetically modified sugarcane, known as NXI-4T, for food and cultivation, developed for drought resistance. This sugarcane was developed by PT Riset Perkebunan Nusantara (Nusantara Plantation Research) in cooperation with Jember University. The plant was modified using Agrobacterium tumefaciens and the plasmid pMHL2113. Agrobacterium transferred the betA gene from the bacterium Rhizobium meliloti, which is associated with the production of betaine, a substance that helps plants protect themselves from water stress.

=== CABB Sugarcane ===
In June 2024, Pakistan approved two genetically modified sugarcane varieties for commercial cultivation: one insect-resistant (CABB-IRS) and the other herbicide-tolerant (CABB-HTS). These varieties were developed by Professor Muhammad Sarwar Khan, Rector of Faisalabad University of Agriculture, and his team at the Center for Agricultural Biochemistry and Biotechnology. This is the first GM crop authorized for large-scale cultivation for food purposes in the country.
