= Pempelia albariella =

Scientific classification
- Kingdom: Animalia
- Phylum: Arthropoda
- Clade: Pancrustacea
- Class: Insecta
- Order: Lepidoptera
- Family: Pyralidae
- Genus: Pempelia
- Species: P. albariella

Binomial name
- Pempelia albariella Zeller, 1839

Synonyms
- Pempelia albariella dilucida Staudinger, 1879

Species of moth

Pempelia albariella is a species of snout moth. It is found in Spain, France, Italy, Croatia, North Macedonia, Hungary, Slovakia, Romania, Ukraine, Russia (particularly in Crimea) and Kazakhstan.

The wingspan is about 18–19 millimetres (0.71–0.75 in).
