= Pempelia albicostella =

Scientific classification
- Domain: Eukaryota
- Kingdom: Animalia
- Phylum: Arthropoda
- Class: Insecta
- Order: Lepidoptera
- Family: Pyralidae
- Genus: Pempelia
- Species: P. albicostella

Binomial name
- Pempelia albicostella Amsel, 1958

Species of moth

Pempelia albicostella is a species of snout moth. It is found on Cyprus.

The wingspan is about 14 mm.
