= Pempelia amoenella =

Scientific classification
- Kingdom: Animalia
- Phylum: Arthropoda
- Clade: Pancrustacea
- Class: Insecta
- Order: Lepidoptera
- Family: Pyralidae
- Genus: Pempelia
- Species: P. amoenella

Binomial name
- Pempelia amoenella (Zeller, 1848)

Synonyms
- Acrobasis amoenella Zeller, 1848

Species of moth

Pempelia amoenella is a species of snout moth. It is found in Albania, North Macedonia, Greece, Romania, Croatia, Turkey, Kazakhstan and Mongolia.
