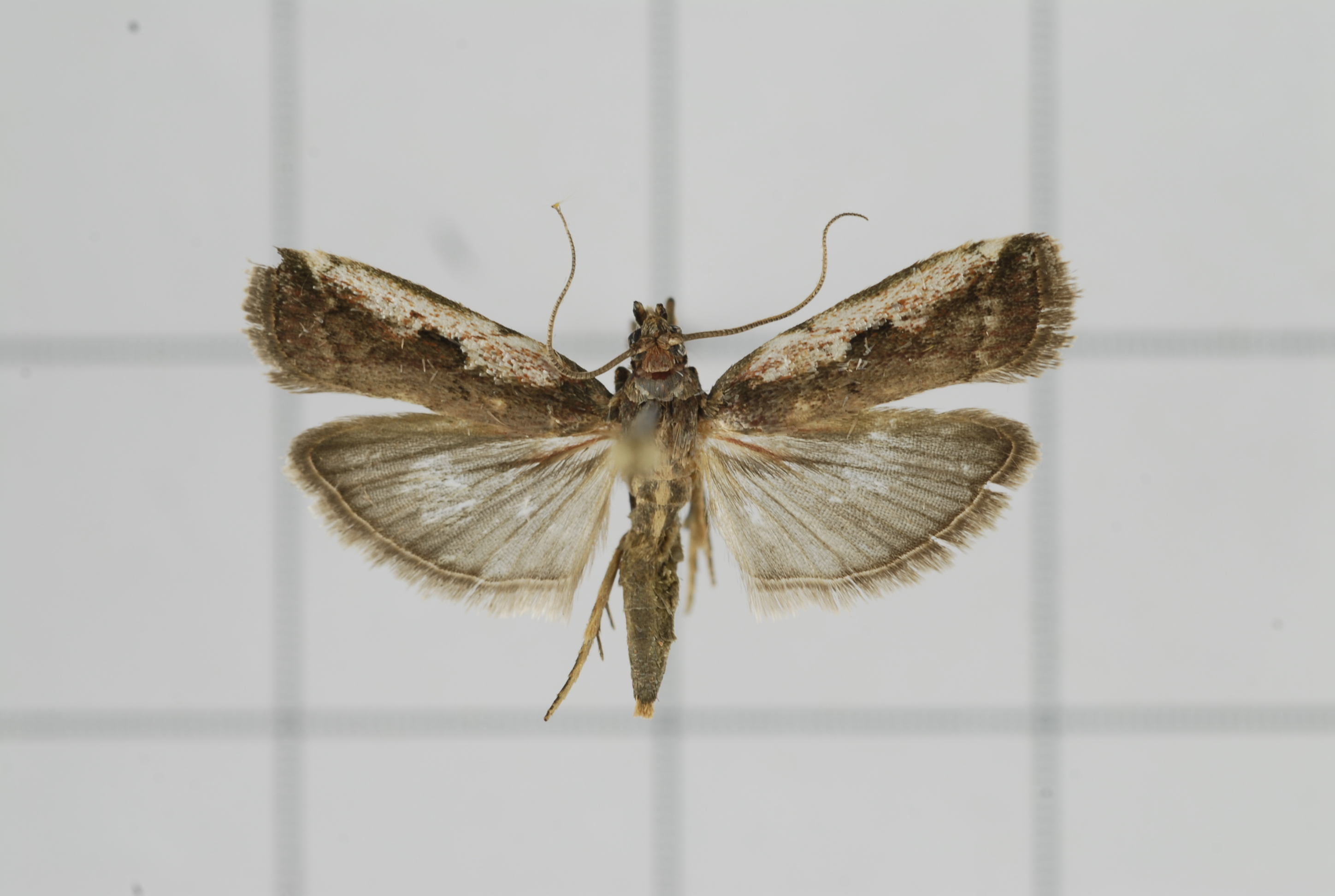

Scientific classification
- Kingdom: Animalia
- Phylum: Arthropoda
- Class: Insecta
- Order: Lepidoptera
- Family: Pyralidae
- Genus: Aurana
- Species: A. vinaceella

Binomial name
- Aurana vinaceella (Inoue, 1963)

Synonyms
- Rhodophaea vinaceella Inoue, 1963; Pempelia vinaceella

= Aurana vinaceella =

Species of moth

Aurana vinaceella is a species of snout moth in the genus Aurana. It was described by Hiroshi Inoue in 1963 and is known from Japan.
