= Yoshiyasua =

Scientific classification
- Kingdom: Animalia
- Phylum: Arthropoda
- Clade: Pancrustacea
- Class: Insecta
- Order: Lepidoptera
- Family: Crambidae
- Subfamily: Musotiminae
- Genus: Yoshiyasua; Kemal & Koçak, 2005
- Species: Y. yasudai

Binomial name
- Yoshiyasua yasudai (Yoshiyasu, 1985)

Synonyms
- Melanochroa Yoshiyasu, 1985 (non Roeder, 1886: preoccupied); Melanochroa yasudai Yoshiyasu, 1985

Genus of moths

Yoshiyasua is a grass moth genus (family Crambidae) of subfamily Musotiminae. Some authors have placed it in the snout moth family (Pyralidae), where all grass moths were once also included, but this seems to be in error. The genus contains only one species, Yoshiyasua yasudai, which is found in Japan, where it has been recorded from the Ryukyu Islands.

== Etymology ==
The name refers to the genus' describer, entomologist Yutaka Yoshiyasu of Kyoto Prefectural University. The original name chosen by Yoshiyasu, Melanochroa, had to be changed because it properly refers to a genus of soldier flies (family Stratiomyidae, subfamily Stratiomyinae, tribe Prosopochrysini) described in 1886 already.
