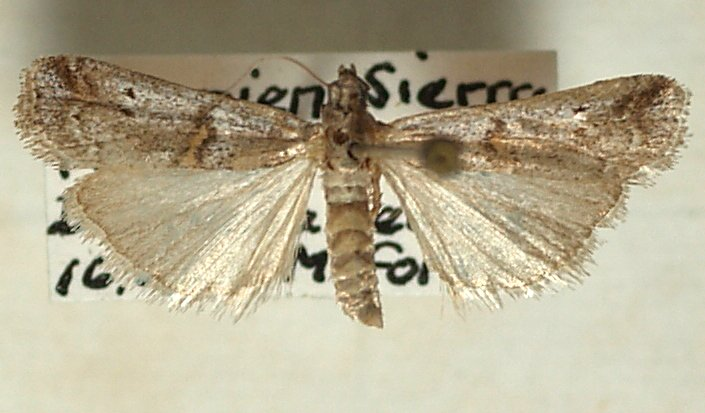

Scientific classification
- Domain: Eukaryota
- Kingdom: Animalia
- Phylum: Arthropoda
- Class: Insecta
- Order: Lepidoptera
- Family: Pyralidae
- Genus: Pempelia
- Species: P. brephiella

Binomial name
- Pempelia brephiella (Staudinger, 1880)

Synonyms
- Nephopteryx brephiella Staudinger, 1879; Pristarthria brephiella; Prosora brephiella

= Pempelia brephiella =

Species of moth

Pempelia brephiella is a moth of the family Pyralidae. It is found in Southwestern Europe.
