= Pempelia johannella =

Scientific classification
- Domain: Eukaryota
- Kingdom: Animalia
- Phylum: Arthropoda
- Class: Insecta
- Order: Lepidoptera
- Family: Pyralidae
- Genus: Pempelia
- Species: P. johannella

Binomial name
- Pempelia johannella (Caradja, 1916)

Synonyms
- Nephopterix johannella Caradja, 1916

Species of moth

Pempelia johannella is a species of snout moth. It is found in Romania and Greece.
