= Thopeutis diffusifascia =

Scientific classification
- Domain: Eukaryota
- Kingdom: Animalia
- Phylum: Arthropoda
- Class: Insecta
- Order: Lepidoptera
- Family: Crambidae
- Subfamily: Crambinae
- Tribe: Haimbachiini
- Genus: Thopeutis
- Species: T. diffusifascia

Binomial name
- Thopeutis diffusifascia (Dyar, 1910)

Synonyms
- Chilo diffusifascia Hampson, 1919

Species of moth

Thopeutis diffusifascia is a moth in the family Crambidae. It was described by Harrison Gray Dyar Jr. in 1910. It is found in Uruguay.
