= Diatraea ragonoti =

Scientific classification
- Domain: Eukaryota
- Kingdom: Animalia
- Phylum: Arthropoda
- Class: Insecta
- Order: Lepidoptera
- Family: Crambidae
- Genus: Diatraea
- Species: D. ragonoti

Binomial name
- Diatraea ragonoti Box, 1948

Species of moth

Diatraea ragonoti is a moth in the family Crambidae. It was described by Harold Edmund Box in 1948. It is found in Brazil.
