= Diatraea muellerella =

Scientific classification
- Kingdom: Animalia
- Phylum: Arthropoda
- Class: Insecta
- Order: Lepidoptera
- Family: Crambidae
- Genus: Diatraea
- Species: D. muellerella

Binomial name
- Diatraea muellerella Dyar & Heinrich, 1927

Species of moth

Diatraea muellerella is a moth in the family Crambidae. It was described by Harrison Gray Dyar Jr. and Carl Heinrich in 1927. It is found in Guerrero, Mexico.
