= Diatraea mitteri =

Scientific classification
- Kingdom: Animalia
- Phylum: Arthropoda
- Clade: Pancrustacea
- Class: Insecta
- Order: Lepidoptera
- Family: Crambidae
- Genus: Diatraea
- Species: D. mitteri

Binomial name
- Diatraea mitteri Solis, 2015

Species of moth

Diatraea mitteri is a moth in the family Crambidae. It was described by Solis in 2015. It is found in the United States, where it has been recorded from Kansas, Oklahoma and Texas.

The larvae feed on Tripsacum dactyloides.
