= Alphacrambus razowskii =

Scientific classification
- Domain: Eukaryota
- Kingdom: Animalia
- Phylum: Arthropoda
- Class: Insecta
- Order: Lepidoptera
- Family: Crambidae
- Genus: Alphacrambus
- Species: A. razowskii

Binomial name
- Alphacrambus razowskii Błeszyński, 1961

Synonyms
- Crambus razowskii Błeszyński, 1961

Species of moth

Alphacrambus razowskii is a moth of the family Crambidae in the genus Alphacrambus. It was described by Stanisław Błeszyński in 1961 and is known from South Africa.
