= Southwestern corn borer =

Scientific classification
- Kingdom: Animalia
- Phylum: Arthropoda
- Clade: Pancrustacea
- Class: Insecta
- Order: Lepidoptera
- Family: Crambidae
- Genus: Diatraea
- Species: D. grandiosella

Binomial name
- Diatraea grandiosella Dyar, 1911

Species of moth

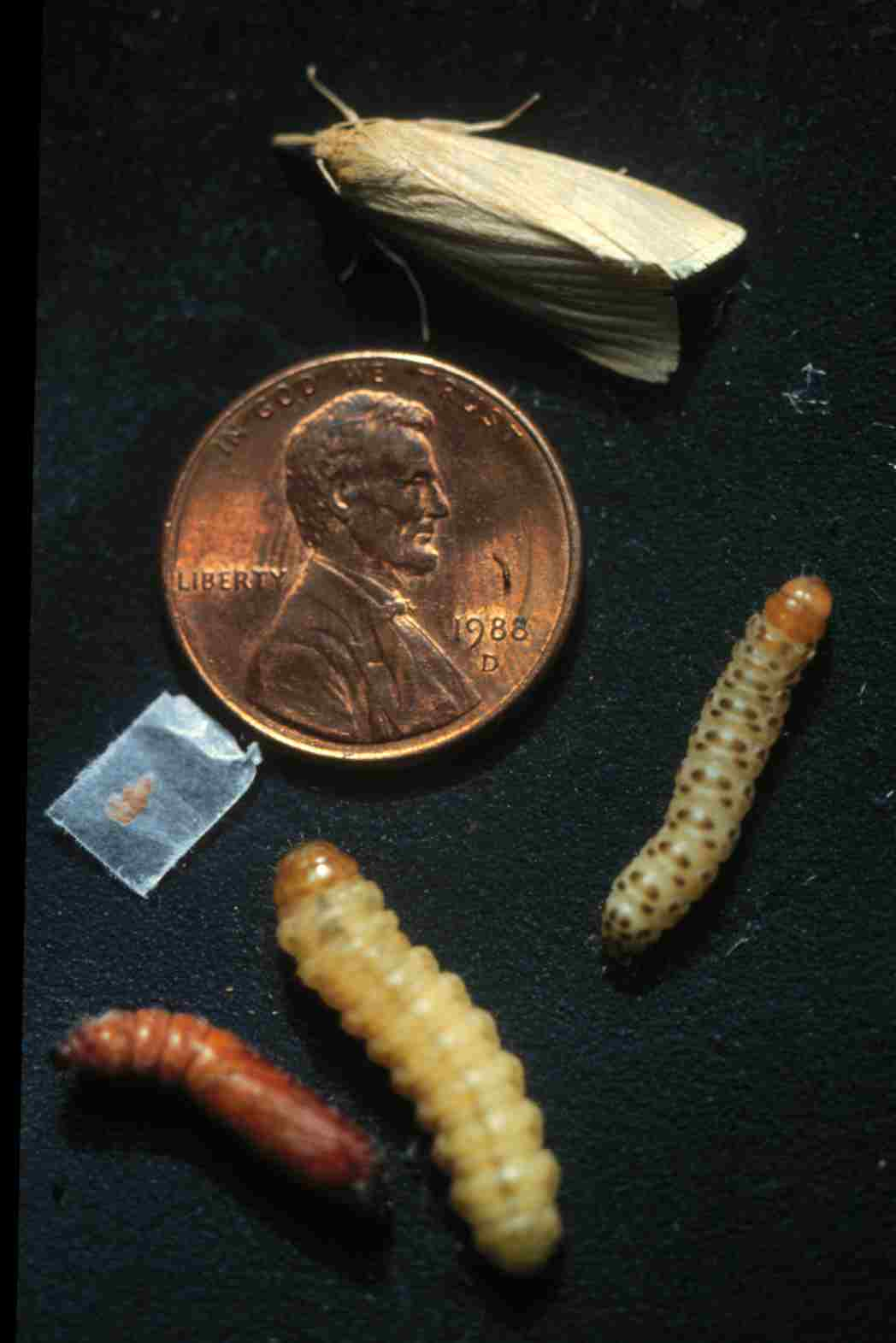
Life stages, clockwise starting at top: adult moth, non-diapausing (spotted) last-instar larva, diapausing (immaculate) larva, pupa, eggs (laid on wax paper), first-instar larva (above date on coin)

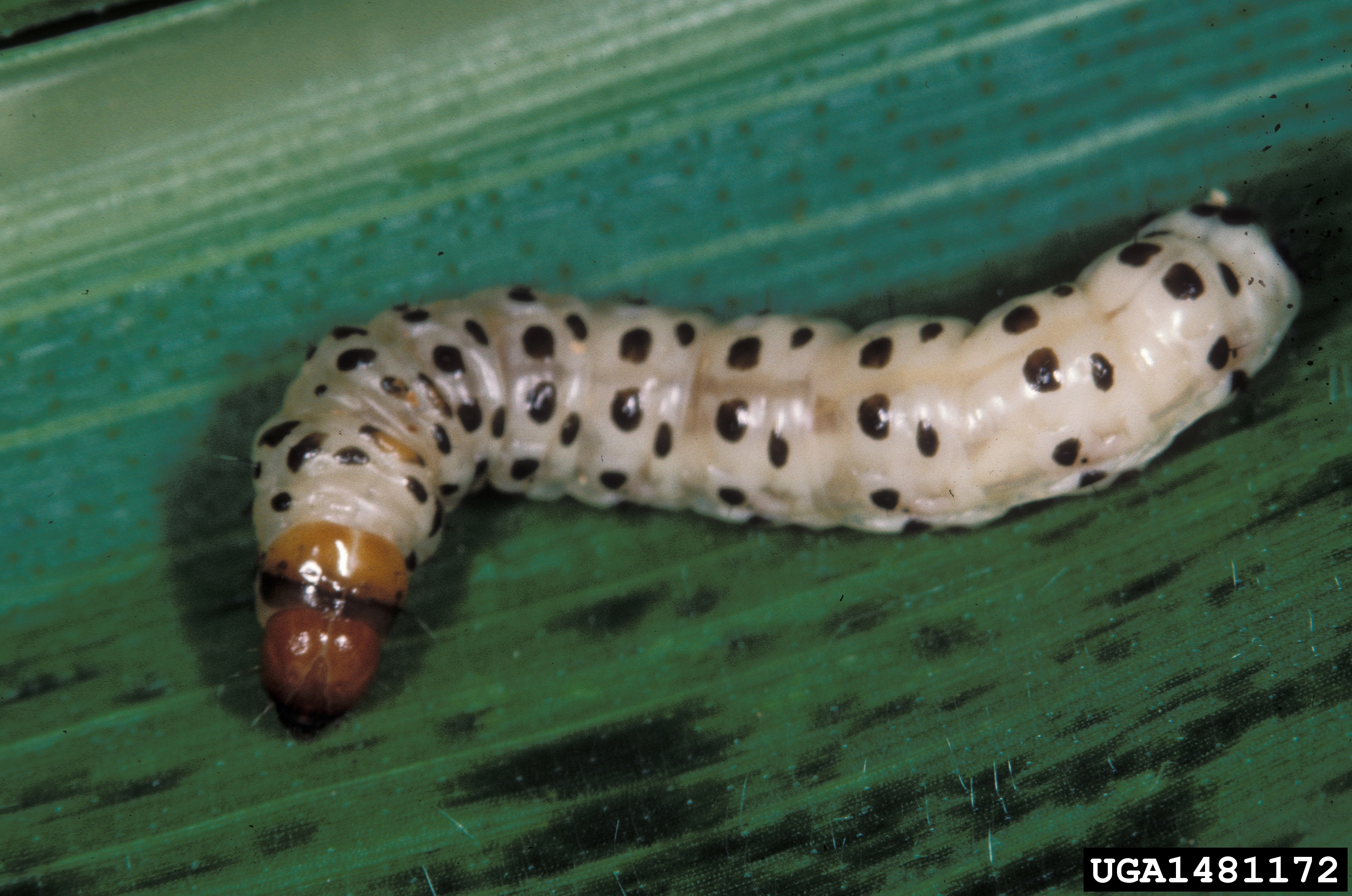
Larval stage

The southwestern corn borer, Diatraea grandiosella, is a moth belonging to the sub-order Heterocera. Like most moths, The southwestern corn borer undergoes complete metamorphosis developing as an egg, larva (caterpillar), pupa and adult. It is capable of entering diapause in its larva stage and under the conditions of a precise photoperiod. Growth and development are regulated by juvenile hormones. The southwestern corn borer has an extensive range. It occurs in Mexico and in Alabama, Arizona, Arkansas, Colorado, Illinois, Indiana, Kansas, Kentucky, Louisiana, Mississippi, Missouri, Nebraska, New Mexico, Oklahoma, Tennessee, and Texas.

Known host plants of D. grandiosella include sugarcane, forage and grain sorghums, broomcorn, and Johnsongrass, teosinte, and millet, as well as field corn, popcorn, and sweetcorn. It remains a serious agricultural pest of corn (maize).

== Pest control ==
Infestation is sometimes controlled by the use of pheromone traps that lure adult male moths. The practice of carefully timed planting dates, use of early maturing varieties, and the destruction of crop residues are well-established methods for suppressing populations of borer on many crops. Bacillus thuringiensis, a bacterium, is often applied as a pesticide. Chemical pesticides continue to be used for infestation control. Efforts have been underway to breed strains of corn (maize) that are resistant to the southwestern corn borer. The USDA has documented an increase in corn production when genetically engineered corn, resistant to corn borers, was grown in place of non-genetically engineered corn. Under biological control practices, a variety of methods can be used against the borer at one time. This would include the introduction of predators or parasites.

Nocturnal insectivores often feed on moths; these include some bats, some species of owls and other species of birds. Moths are also eaten by some species of lizards, cats, dogs, rodents, and some bears. Moth larvae are vulnerable to being parasitized by Ichneumonidae.
