= Thopeutis diatraealis =

Scientific classification
- Domain: Eukaryota
- Kingdom: Animalia
- Phylum: Arthropoda
- Class: Insecta
- Order: Lepidoptera
- Family: Crambidae
- Subfamily: Crambinae
- Tribe: Haimbachiini
- Genus: Thopeutis
- Species: T. diatraealis

Binomial name
- Thopeutis diatraealis (Hampson, 1919)

Synonyms
- Eromene diatraealis Hampson, 1919

Species of insect

Thopeutis diatraealis is a moth in the family Crambidae. It was described by George Hampson in 1919. It is found in Mexico City, Mexico.
