= Pempelia heringii =

Scientific classification
- Domain: Eukaryota
- Kingdom: Animalia
- Phylum: Arthropoda
- Class: Insecta
- Order: Lepidoptera
- Family: Pyralidae
- Genus: Pempelia
- Species: P. heringii

Binomial name
- Pempelia heringii (Ragonot, 1888)

Synonyms
- Pempelia heringi (Ragonot, 1888); Rhodophaea heringi; Nephopteryx rubrizonella Ragonot 1893; Phycita rubizonella

Species of moth

Pempelia heringii, the pear fruit borer, is a moth of the family Pyralidae found in Japan and China and also reported from Hawaii. Two generations occur per year. Larvae have been reported feeding on apple, pear, and Chinese hawthorn.
