= Diatraea busckella =

Scientific classification
- Domain: Eukaryota
- Kingdom: Animalia
- Phylum: Arthropoda
- Class: Insecta
- Order: Lepidoptera
- Family: Crambidae
- Genus: Diatraea
- Species: D. busckella

Binomial name
- Diatraea busckella Dyar & Heinrich, 1927

Synonyms
- Diatraea busckella f. falconensis Box, 1951; Diatraea busckella f. setariaeoides Box, 1951; Diatraea setarioides Bleszynski, 1967; Diatraea busckella setariae Box, 1951; Diatraea setariaeoides Box, 1951; Diatraea luteella Box, 1931; Diatraea rosa Heinrich, 1931; Diatraea colombiana Box, 1956

Species of moth

Diatraea busckella is a moth in the family Crambidae. It was described by Harrison Gray Dyar Jr. and Carl Heinrich in 1927. It is found in Panama, Ecuador, Colombia and Venezuela.
