= Peniculimius moorei =

Scientific classification
- Kingdom: Animalia
- Phylum: Arthropoda
- Clade: Pancrustacea
- Class: Insecta
- Order: Lepidoptera
- Family: Crambidae
- Subfamily: Crambinae
- Tribe: Diptychophorini
- Genus: Peniculimius
- Species: P. moorei

Binomial name
- Peniculimius moorei (Gaskin, 1974)

Synonyms
- Pareromene moorei Gaskin, 1974

Species of moth

Peniculimius moorei is a moth in the family Crambidae. It was described by David E. Gaskin in 1974. It is found in Sarawak, Malaysia.
