= Diatraea impersonatellus =

Scientific classification
- Kingdom: Animalia
- Phylum: Arthropoda
- Class: Insecta
- Order: Lepidoptera
- Family: Crambidae
- Genus: Diatraea
- Species: D. impersonatellus

Binomial name
- Diatraea impersonatellus (Walker, 1863)

Synonyms
- Crambus impersonatellus Walker, 1863; Diatraea moorella Dyar & Heinrich, 1927; Diatraea angustella Dyar, 1911; Diatraea flavipennella Box, 1931; Diatraea pallidostricta Dyar, 1911

Species of moth

Diatraea impersonatellus is a moth in the family Crambidae. It was described by Francis Walker in 1863. It is found in Guyana, Brazil and Venezuela.
