= Diatraea venosalis =

Scientific classification
- Kingdom: Animalia
- Phylum: Arthropoda
- Class: Insecta
- Order: Lepidoptera
- Family: Crambidae
- Genus: Diatraea
- Species: D. venosalis

Binomial name
- Diatraea venosalis (Dyar, 1917)

Synonyms
- Haimbachia venosalis Dyar, 1917

Species of moth

Diatraea venosalis is a moth in the family Crambidae. It was described by Harrison Gray Dyar Jr. in 1917. It is found in the US states of Louisiana and Oklahoma.

The wingspan is about 18 mm. Adults have been recorded on wing in May and June.
