= Alphacrambus prodontellus =

Scientific classification
- Kingdom: Animalia
- Phylum: Arthropoda
- Class: Insecta
- Order: Lepidoptera
- Family: Crambidae
- Genus: Alphacrambus
- Species: A. prodontellus

Binomial name
- Alphacrambus prodontellus (Hampson, 1919)

Synonyms
- Crambus prodontellus Hampson, 1919

Species of moth

Alphacrambus prodontellus is a moth of the family Crambidae in the genus Alphacrambus. It was described by George Hampson in 1919 and is known from South Africa and Kenya.
