= Peniculimius crassus =

Scientific classification
- Domain: Eukaryota
- Kingdom: Animalia
- Phylum: Arthropoda
- Class: Insecta
- Order: Lepidoptera
- Family: Crambidae
- Subfamily: Crambinae
- Tribe: Diptychophorini
- Genus: Peniculimius
- Species: P. crassus

Binomial name
- Peniculimius crassus Schouten, 1994

Species of moth

Peniculimius crassus is a moth in the family Crambidae. It was described by Schouten in 1994. It is found in Malaysia (Sabah).
