= Alphacrambus cristatus =

Scientific classification
- Domain: Eukaryota
- Kingdom: Animalia
- Phylum: Arthropoda
- Class: Insecta
- Order: Lepidoptera
- Family: Crambidae
- Genus: Alphacrambus
- Species: A. cristatus

Binomial name
- Alphacrambus cristatus Bassi, 1995

Species of moth

Alphacrambus cristatus is a species of moth in the family Crambidae in the genus Alphacrambus. It was described by Graziano Bassi in 1995 and is known from Ethiopia.
