= Steneromene nymphocharis =

Scientific classification
- Kingdom: Animalia
- Phylum: Arthropoda
- Class: Insecta
- Order: Lepidoptera
- Family: Crambidae
- Subfamily: Crambinae
- Tribe: Diptychophorini
- Genus: Steneromene
- Species: S. nymphocharis

Binomial name
- Steneromene nymphocharis (Meyrick, 1932)

Synonyms
- Diptychophora nymphocharis Meyrick, 1932

Species of moth

Steneromene nymphocharis is a moth in the family Crambidae. It was described by Edward Meyrick in 1932, and is found in Argentina.
