= Diatraea bellifactella =

Scientific classification
- Kingdom: Animalia
- Phylum: Arthropoda
- Class: Insecta
- Order: Lepidoptera
- Family: Crambidae
- Genus: Diatraea
- Species: D. bellifactella

Binomial name
- Diatraea bellifactella Dyar, 1911

Synonyms
- Diatraea balboana Box, 1956

Species of moth

Diatraea bellifactella is a moth in the family Crambidae. It was described by Harrison Gray Dyar Jr. in 1911. It is found in Brazilian states of São Paulo and Parana and Panama.
