= Centro de Tecnologia Canavieira =

- Company type: S.A.
- Industry: R&D, consulting
- Founded: 1969
- Headquarters: Piracicaba, São Paulo, Brazil
- Key people: President: Luís Roberto Pogetti (Copersucar) Vice-president : Pedro Mizutani (Raízen)
- Website: http://www.ctcanavieira.com.br

Centro de Tecnologia Canavieira (English:Sugarcane Research Center) or CTC is the largest sugarcane technology center in the world. Its headquarters is located in Piracicaba, São Paulo in one of the most prosperous agribusiness regions in Brazil. CTC was founded in 1969, to attend the technological needs of Copersucar sugarcane producers. In 2004, the Sugarcane Research Center started offering innovation and technology also to sugarcane producers and processors associates all over Brazil. CTC became a S.A. company in 2011, and since then, Copersucar and Raízen are the company majority owners.

CTC has more than 130 associated members, among mills and associations of sugarcane suppliers, representing thousands of farmers and approximately 60% of the sugarcane produced in Brazil.

The Sugarcane Breeding Program is one of the most important of the CTC projects because of its global effects on competitiveness of Brazilian sugarcane producers. But there are also other important CTC research projects in areas such as agricultural and industrial production processes.

In June 2017, it was granted the commercial use of genetically modified sugarcane. In May 2018, the company announced an expansion into North America with a research center in the St. Louis, Missouri area of the Central United States.

== Research areas ==
- Biotechnology;
- Plant protection;
- Agricultural and industrial engineering;
- Agronomy;
- Varieties program;
- Ethanol production;
- Energy production;
- Sugar production;
