= Diatraea guatemalella =

Scientific classification
- Domain: Eukaryota
- Kingdom: Animalia
- Phylum: Arthropoda
- Class: Insecta
- Order: Lepidoptera
- Family: Crambidae
- Genus: Diatraea
- Species: D. guatemalella

Binomial name
- Diatraea guatemalella Schaus, 1922

Species of moth

Diatraea guatemalella is a moth in the family Crambidae. It was described by Schaus in 1922. It is found in Guatemala.
