= Diatraea considerata =

Scientific classification
- Domain: Eukaryota
- Kingdom: Animalia
- Phylum: Arthropoda
- Class: Insecta
- Order: Lepidoptera
- Family: Crambidae
- Genus: Diatraea
- Species: D. considerata

Binomial name
- Diatraea considerata Heinrich, 1931

Species of moth

Diatraea considerata is a moth in the family Crambidae. It was described by Carl Heinrich in 1931. It is found in Sinaloa, Mexico.
