= Diatraea strigipennella =

Scientific classification
- Kingdom: Animalia
- Phylum: Arthropoda
- Class: Insecta
- Order: Lepidoptera
- Family: Crambidae
- Genus: Diatraea
- Species: D. strigipennella

Binomial name
- Diatraea strigipennella Dyar, 1911

Synonyms
- Diatraea entreriana Box, 1931

Species of moth

Diatraea strigipennella is a moth in the family Crambidae. It was described by Harrison Gray Dyar Jr. in 1911. It is found in the Guianas, Brazil and Argentina.
