= Alphacrambus phoeostrigellus =

Scientific classification
- Kingdom: Animalia
- Phylum: Arthropoda
- Class: Insecta
- Order: Lepidoptera
- Family: Crambidae
- Genus: Alphacrambus
- Species: A. phoeostrigellus

Binomial name
- Alphacrambus phoeostrigellus (Hampson, 1903)

Synonyms
- Crambus phoeostrigellus Hampson, 1903; Crambus phaeostrigellus Błeszyński & Collins, 1962

Species of moth

Alphacrambus phoeostrigellus is a moth of the family Crambidae in the genus Alphacrambus. It was described by George Hampson in 1903 and is known from India.
