= Diatraea rufescens =

Scientific classification
- Domain: Eukaryota
- Kingdom: Animalia
- Phylum: Arthropoda
- Class: Insecta
- Order: Lepidoptera
- Family: Crambidae
- Genus: Diatraea
- Species: D. rufescens

Binomial name
- Diatraea rufescens Box, 1931

Species of moth

Diatraea rufescens is a moth in the family Crambidae. It was described by Harold Edmund Box in 1931. It is found in Bolivia.
