= Thopeutis respersalis =

Scientific classification
- Kingdom: Animalia
- Phylum: Arthropoda
- Class: Insecta
- Order: Lepidoptera
- Family: Crambidae
- Subfamily: Crambinae
- Tribe: Haimbachiini
- Genus: Thopeutis
- Species: T. respersalis

Binomial name
- Thopeutis respersalis Hübner, 1818

Synonyms
- Chilo ceres Butler, 1883

Species of moth

Thopeutis respersalis is a moth in the family Crambidae. It was described by Jacob Hübner in 1818, and is found in both Uruguay and Chile.
