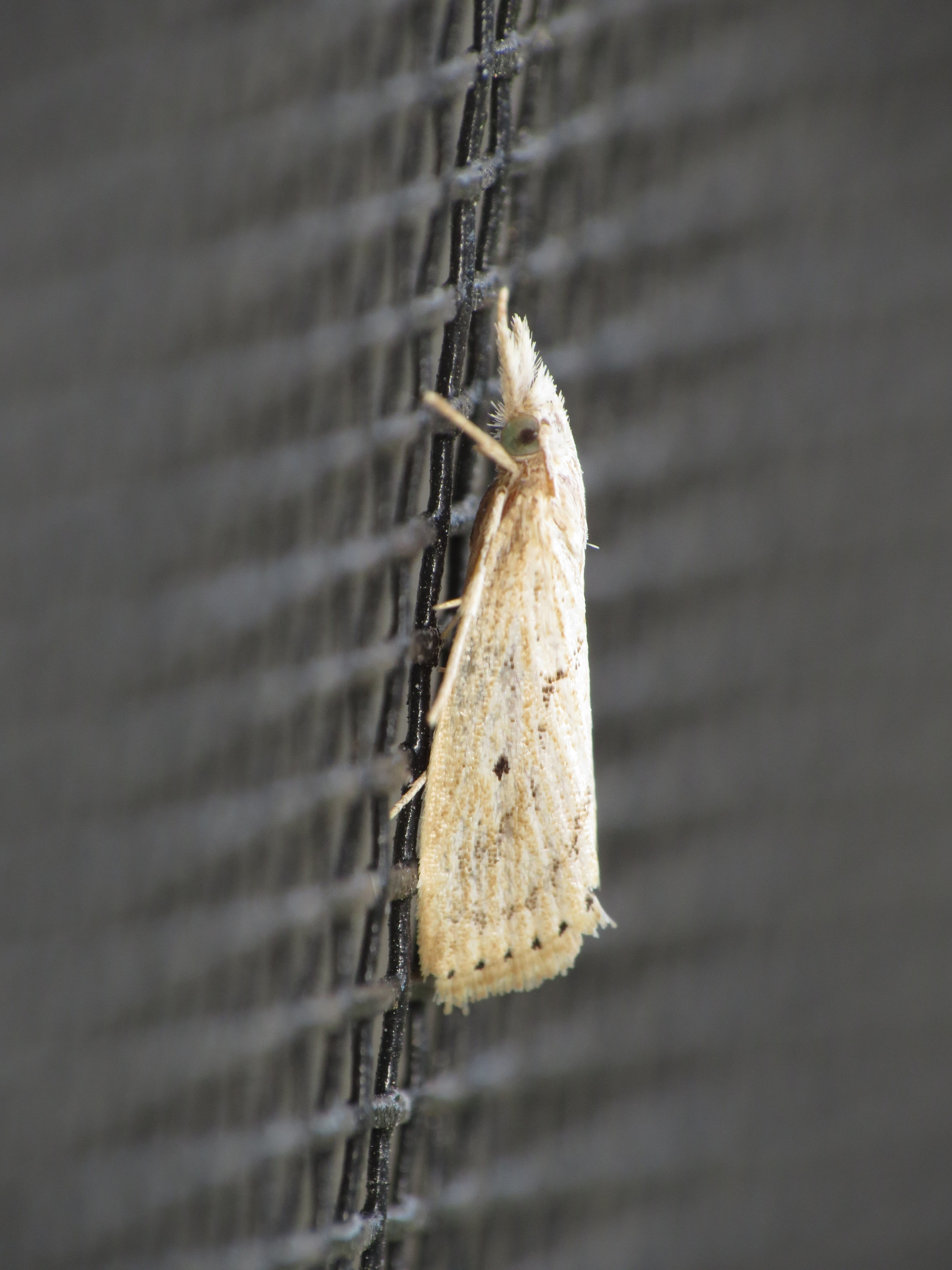
- Diatraea lisetta (Dyar, 1909), to MV light, Kissimmee, Florida, May 2015

Scientific classification
- Kingdom: Animalia
- Phylum: Arthropoda
- Class: Insecta
- Order: Lepidoptera
- Family: Crambidae
- Genus: Diatraea
- Species: D. lisetta

Binomial name
- Diatraea lisetta (Dyar, 1909)

Synonyms
- Iesta lisetta Dyar, 1909; Iesta adulcia Dyar, 1916; Iesta cancellalis Dyar, 1914

= Diatraea lisetta =

Species of moth

Diatraea lisetta is a moth in the family Crambidae. It was described by Harrison Gray Dyar Jr. in 1909. It is found in Panama, Mexico and the United States, where it has been recorded from Alabama, Florida, Georgia, Louisiana, Maryland, Mississippi, South Carolina, Tennessee and Virginia.
