= Diatraea veracruzana =

Scientific classification
- Domain: Eukaryota
- Kingdom: Animalia
- Phylum: Arthropoda
- Class: Insecta
- Order: Lepidoptera
- Family: Crambidae
- Genus: Diatraea
- Species: D. veracruzana

Binomial name
- Diatraea veracruzana Box, 1956

Species of moth

Diatraea veracruzana is a moth in the family Crambidae. It was described by Harold Edmund Box in 1956. It is found in Veracruz, Mexico.
