= Melanochroa =

Melanochroa may refer to three different insect genera:

- Melanochroa Brauer, 1882, a synonym for Nothomyia, a genus of flies
- Melanochroa Broun, 1882, a synonym for Cyclaxyra, a genus of beetles
- Melanochroa Roeder, 1886, a synonym for Nothomyia, a genus of flies
- Melanochroa Yoshiyasu, 1985, a synonym for Yoshiyasua, a genus of moths
