= Diatraea dyari =

Scientific classification
- Domain: Eukaryota
- Kingdom: Animalia
- Phylum: Arthropoda
- Class: Insecta
- Order: Lepidoptera
- Family: Crambidae
- Genus: Diatraea
- Species: D. dyari

Binomial name
- Diatraea dyari Box, 1930

Species of moth

Diatraea dyari is a moth in the family Crambidae. It was described by Harold Edmund Box in 1930. It is found in Argentina.
