= Diatraea lineolata =

Scientific classification
- Kingdom: Animalia
- Phylum: Arthropoda
- Class: Insecta
- Order: Lepidoptera
- Family: Crambidae
- Genus: Diatraea
- Species: D. lineolata

Binomial name
- Diatraea lineolata (Walker, 1856)

Synonyms
- Leucania lineolata Walker, 1856; Chilo culmicolellus Zeller, 1863; Chilo neuricellus Zeller, 1863

Species of moth

Diatraea lineolata, the Neotropical cornstalk borer, is a moth in the family Crambidae. It was described by Francis Walker in 1856. It is found in Mexico, Costa Rica, Guatemala, Honduras, Panama, Venezuela, Colombia, Brazil, the Guianas, Cuba, the Bahamas and southern Texas.

The wingspan is about 28 mm.

The larvae feed on Zea mays.
