= Diatraea schausella =

Scientific classification
- Kingdom: Animalia
- Phylum: Arthropoda
- Class: Insecta
- Order: Lepidoptera
- Family: Crambidae
- Genus: Diatraea
- Species: D. schausella

Binomial name
- Diatraea schausella Dyar & Heinrich, 1927

Species of moth

Diatraea schausella is a moth in the family Crambidae. It was described by Harrison Gray Dyar Jr. and Carl Heinrich in 1927. It is found in Guatemala.
