= Diatraea myersi =

Scientific classification
- Domain: Eukaryota
- Kingdom: Animalia
- Phylum: Arthropoda
- Class: Insecta
- Order: Lepidoptera
- Family: Crambidae
- Genus: Diatraea
- Species: D. myersi

Binomial name
- Diatraea myersi Box, 1935

Species of moth

Diatraea myersi is a moth in the family Crambidae. It was described by Harold Edmund Box in 1935. It is found in Brazil.
