= Diatraea minimifacta =

Scientific classification
- Domain: Eukaryota
- Kingdom: Animalia
- Phylum: Arthropoda
- Class: Insecta
- Order: Lepidoptera
- Family: Crambidae
- Genus: Diatraea
- Species: D. minimifacta

Binomial name
- Diatraea minimifacta Dyar, 1911

Synonyms
- Diatraerupa guapilella Schaus, 1913; Diatraerupa guapilella; Iesta morobe Dyar, 1916; Diatraea pittieri Box, 1951

Species of moth

Diatraea minimifacta is a moth in the family Crambidae. It was described by Harrison Gray Dyar Jr. in 1911. It is found in Trinidad and Tobago, Costa Rica, Mexico (Tabasco) and Venezuela.
