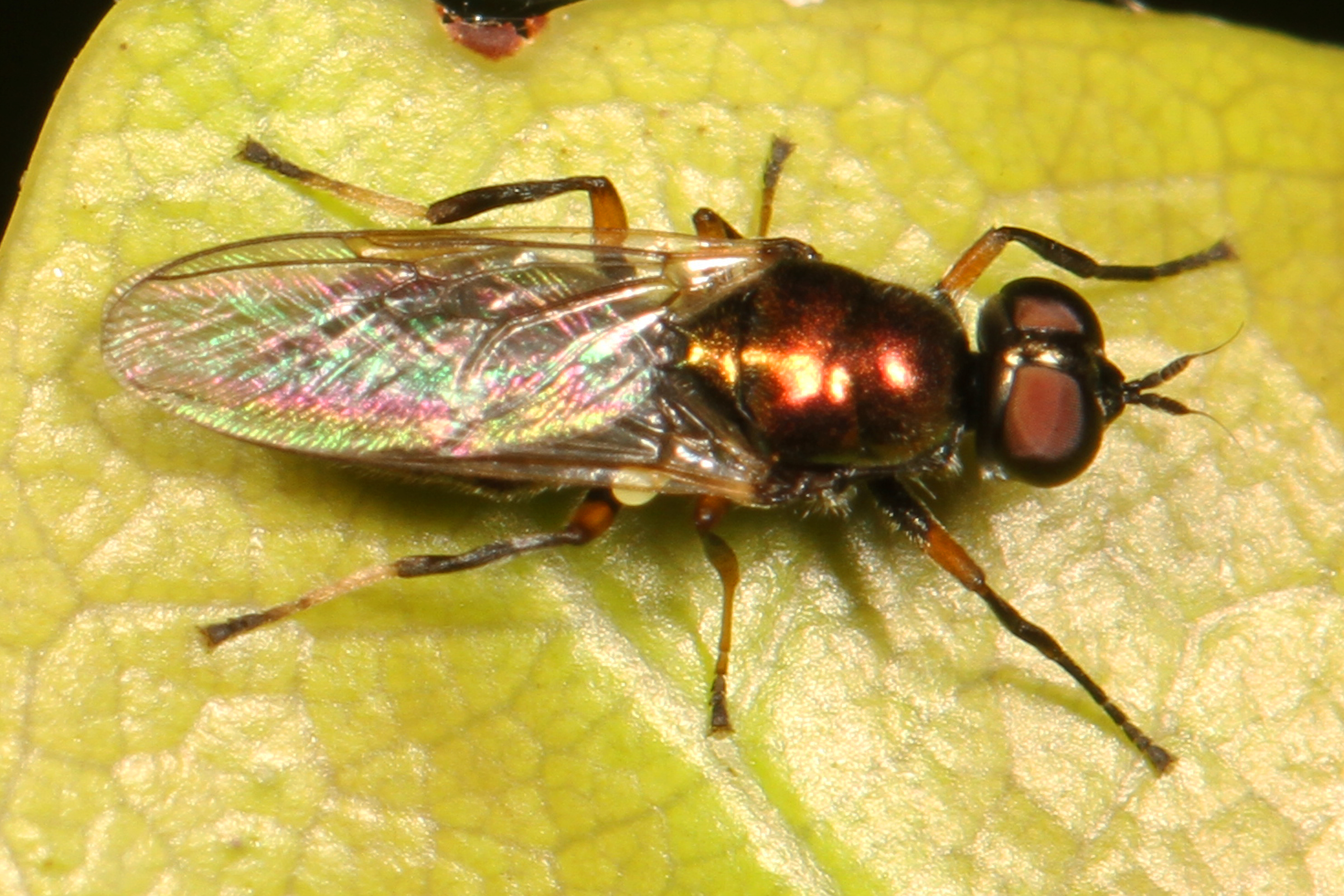

Scientific classification
- Kingdom: Animalia
- Phylum: Arthropoda
- Class: Insecta
- Order: Diptera
- Family: Stratiomyidae
- Subfamily: Stratiomyinae
- Tribe: Prosopochrysini
- Genus: Nothomyia
- Species: N. calopus

Binomial name
- Nothomyia calopus Loew, 1869

= Nothomyia calopus =

Species of fly

Nothomyia calopus is a species of soldier fly in the family Stratiomyidae.

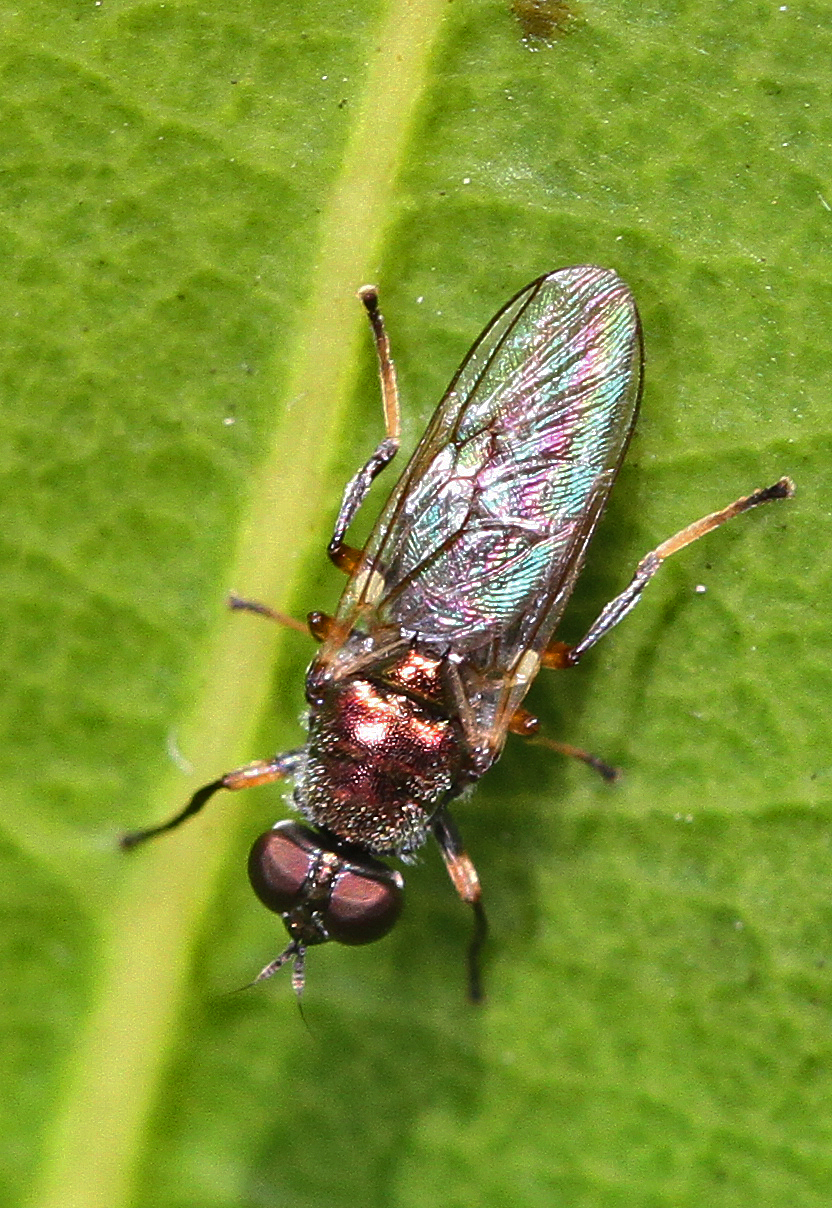

== Distribution ==
United States, Cuba, Puerto Rico.
