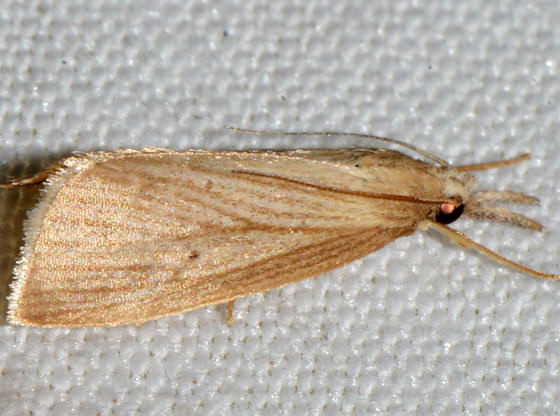

Scientific classification
- Domain: Eukaryota
- Kingdom: Animalia
- Phylum: Arthropoda
- Class: Insecta
- Order: Lepidoptera
- Family: Crambidae
- Genus: Diatraea
- Species: D. evanescens

Binomial name
- Diatraea evanescens Dyar, 1917

Synonyms
- Diatraea sobrinalis Schaus, 1922

= Diatraea evanescens =

Species of moth

Diatraea evanescens is a moth in the family Crambidae. It was described by Harrison Gray Dyar Jr. in 1917. It is found in the US states of Alabama, Arkansas, Florida, Georgia, Louisiana, Maryland, Mississippi, North Carolina, Ohio, Oklahoma, South Carolina, Tennessee and Texas.

The wingspan is about 18–20 mm. Adults have been recorded on wing from March to September.

The larvae feed on Paspalum larranagae.
