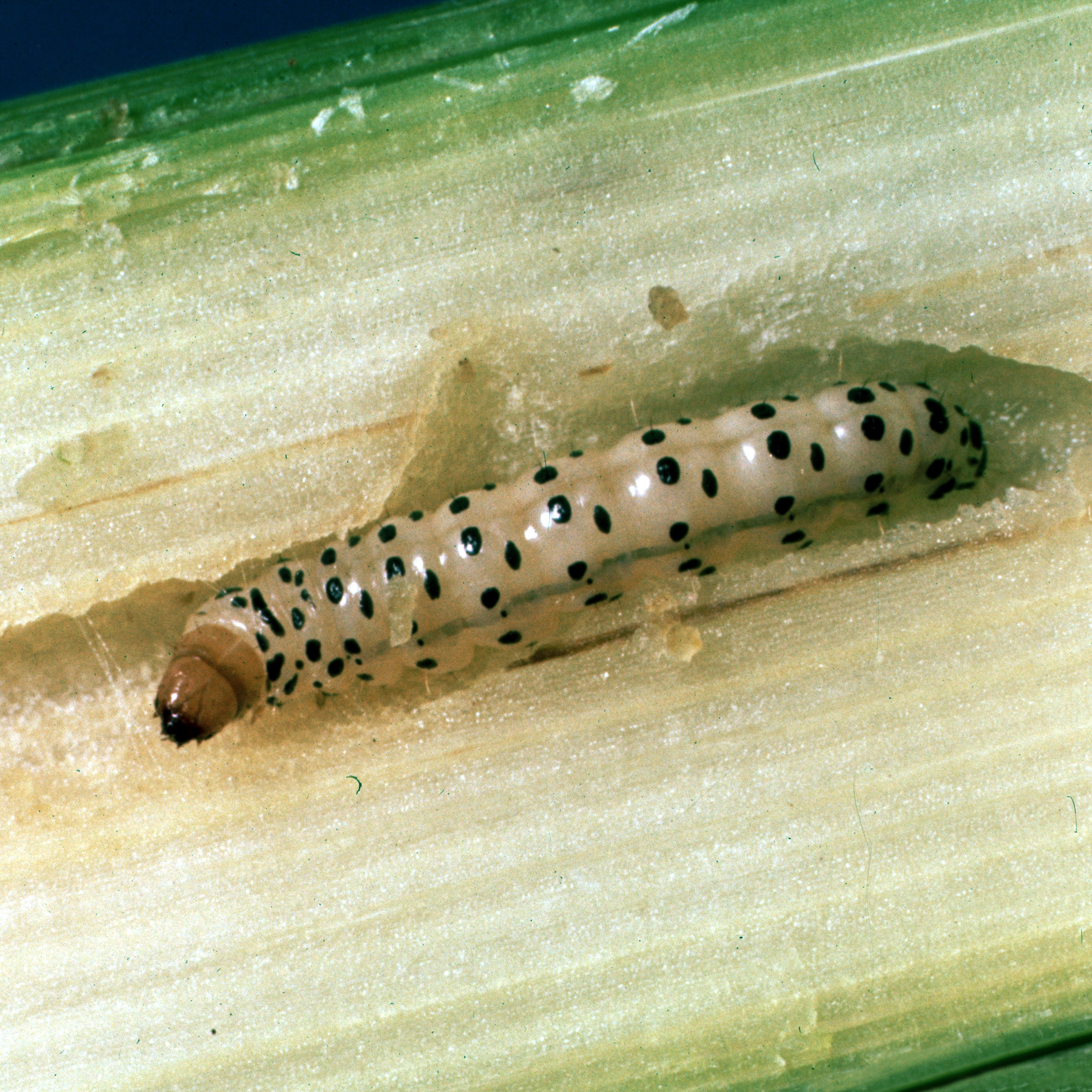
- Larva of Diatraea crambidoides

Scientific classification
- Kingdom: Animalia
- Phylum: Arthropoda
- Clade: Pancrustacea
- Class: Insecta
- Order: Lepidoptera
- Family: Crambidae
- Tribe: Chiloini
- Genus: Diatraea; Guilding, 1828

Synonyms
- Crambidiatraea Box & Capps, 1955; Diaraetria Grote, 1882; Diatraerupa Schaus, 1913; Diatrea Guilding, 1828; Eodiatraea Box, 1953; Iesta Dyar, 1909; Trinidadia Dyar & Heinrich, 1927; Zeadiatraea Box, 1955

= Diatraea =

Genus of moths

Diatraea is a genus of moths in the family Crambidae.

== Species ==
- Diatraea albicrinella Box, 1931
- Diatraea andina Box, 1951
- Diatraea argentina Box, 1931
- Diatraea bellifactella Dyar, 1911
- Diatraea brunnescens Box, 1931
- Diatraea busckella Dyar & Heinrich, 1927
- Diatraea castrensis Dyar & Heinrich, 1927
- Diatraea cayennella Dyar & Heinrich, 1927
- Diatraea centrellus (Möschler, 1883)
- Diatraea considerata Heinrich, 1931
- Diatraea crambidoides (Grote, 1880)
- Diatraea dyari Box, 1930
- Diatraea evanescens Dyar, 1917
- Diatraea fuscella Schaus, 1922
- Diatraea gaga Dyar, 1914
- Diatraea grandiosella Dyar, 1911
- Diatraea guatemalella Schaus, 1922
- Diatraea impersonatellus (Walker, 1863)
- Diatraea indigenella Dyar & Heinrich, 1927
- Diatraea instructella Dyar, 1911
- Diatraea lativittalis (Dognin, 1910)
- Diatraea lentistrialis Hampson, 1919
- Diatraea lineolata (Walker, 1856)
- Diatraea lisetta (Dyar, 1909)
- Diatraea magnifactella Dyar, 1911
- Diatraea maronialis Schaus, 1922
- Diatraea minimifacta Dyar, 1911
- Diatraea mitteri Solis, 2015
- Diatraea muellerella Dyar & Heinrich, 1927
- Diatraea myersi Box, 1935
- Diatraea pedibarbata Dyar, 1911
- Diatraea postlineella Schaus, 1922
- Diatraea ragonoti Box, 1948
- Diatraea rufescens Box, 1931
- Diatraea saccharalis (Fabricius, 1794)
- Diatraea schausella Dyar & Heinrich, 1927
- Diatraea strigipennella Dyar, 1911
- Diatraea suffusella Box, 1931
- Diatraea tabernella Dyar, 1911
- Diatraea venosalis (Dyar, 1917)
- Diatraea veracruzana Box, 1956

== Former species ==
- Diatraea amazonica Box, 1931
- Diatraea amnemonella Dyar, 1911
- Diatraea angustella Dyar, 1911
- Diatraea balboana Box, 1956
- Diatraea colombiana Box, 1956
- Diatraea entreriana Box, 1931
- Diatraea flavipennella Box, 1931
- Diatraea guapilella (Schaus, 1913)
- Diatraea luteella Box, 1931
- Diatraea maritima Box, 1935
- Diatraea morobe (Dyar, 1916)
- Diatraea obliqualis Hampson, 1919
- Diatraea pittieri Box, 1951
- Diatraea rosa Heinrich, 1931
- Diatraea savannarum Box, 1935
- Diatraea silvicola Box, 1951
- Diatraea umbrialis Schaus, 1922
