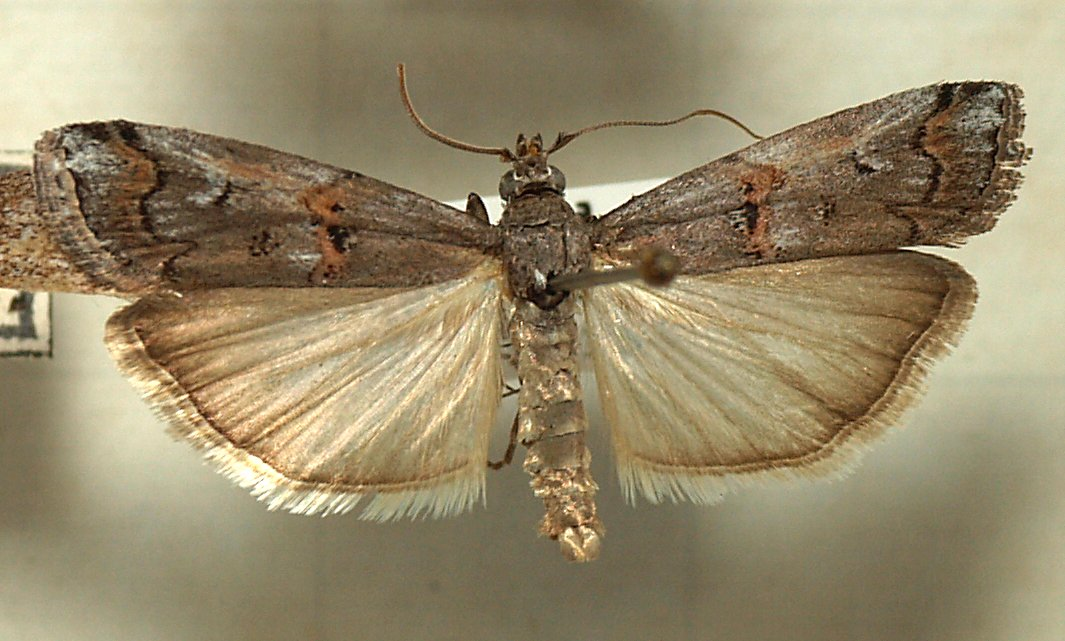
- Pempelia palumbella

Scientific classification
- Kingdom: Animalia
- Phylum: Arthropoda
- Clade: Pancrustacea
- Class: Insecta
- Order: Lepidoptera
- Family: Pyralidae
- Tribe: Phycitini
- Genus: Pempelia; Hübner, [1825]

Synonyms
- Hoeneia Caradja, 1938; Salebria Zeller, 1846

= Pempelia =

Genus of moths

Pempelia is a genus of moths of the family Pyralidae described by Jacob Hübner in 1825.

== Species ==
- Pempelia albariella Zeller, 1839
- Pempelia albicostella Amsel, 1958
- Pempelia albifasciella (Hartig, 1937)
- Pempelia alpigenella Duponchel, 1836
- Pempelia ambustiella Ragonot, 1887
- Pempelia amitella Zerny, 1934
- Pempelia amoenella (Zeller, 1848)
- Pempelia apicella (de Joannis, 1927)
- Pempelia bitinctella (Wileman, 1911)
- Pempelia brephiella (Staudinger, 1879)
- Pempelia campicolella Erschoff, 1874
- Pempelia catonella (Caradja, 1925)
- Pempelia cirtensis (Ragonot, 1890)
- Pempelia corticinella (Ragonot, 1887)
- Pempelia dubiella Duponchel, 1836
- Pempelia erastriella (Ragonot, 1887)
- Pempelia eucometis (Meyrick, 1882)
- Pempelia fibrivora Meyrick, 1934
- Pempelia funebrella (Ragonot, 1893)
- Pempelia genistella Duponchel, [1837]
- Pempelia intricatella (Ragonot, 1887)
- Pempelia heringii (Ragonot in de Joannis & Ragonot, 1889)
- Pempelia johannella Caradja, 1916
- Pempelia livorella Erschoff, 1874
- Pempelia lundbladi Rebel, 1940
- Pempelia maculata (Staudinger, 1876)
- Pempelia malgassicella (Paulian & Viette, 1955)
- Pempelia mesozonella (Bradley, 1966)
- Pempelia nigricans (Hulst, 1900)
- Pempelia nigrisquamella (Ragonot, 1887)
- Pempelia niveicinctella (Ragonot, 1887)
- Pempelia nobilella (Ragonot, 1887)
- Pempelia numidella Ragonot, 1890
- Pempelia obliteratella Erschoff, 1874
- Pempelia palumbella (Denis & Schiffermüller, 1775)
- Pempelia psammenitella Zeller, 1867
- Pempelia romanoffella (Ragonot, 1887)
- Pempelia sablonella (Rothschild, 1915)
- Pempelia semistrigella (Mabille, 1908)
- Pempelia sinensis (Caradja, 1938)
- Pempelia strophocomma (de Joannis, 1932)
