= Thopeutis xylinalis =

Scientific classification
- Kingdom: Animalia
- Phylum: Arthropoda
- Class: Insecta
- Order: Lepidoptera
- Family: Crambidae
- Subfamily: Crambinae
- Tribe: Haimbachiini
- Genus: Thopeutis
- Species: T. xylinalis

Binomial name
- Thopeutis xylinalis (Hampson, 1896)

Synonyms
- Chilo xylinalis Hampson, 1896

Species of moth

Thopeutis xylinalis is a moth in the family Crambidae. It was described by George Hampson in 1896. It is found in Argentina.
