= Steneromene azanalis =

Scientific classification
- Kingdom: Animalia
- Phylum: Arthropoda
- Class: Insecta
- Order: Lepidoptera
- Family: Crambidae
- Subfamily: Crambinae
- Tribe: Diptychophorini
- Genus: Steneromene
- Species: S. azanalis

Binomial name
- Steneromene azanalis (Walker, 1859)

Synonyms
- Zebronia azanalis Walker, 1859

Species of moth

Steneromene azanalis is a moth in the family Crambidae. It was described by Francis Walker in 1859. It is found in Rio de Janeiro, Brazil.
