= Diatraea castrensis =

Scientific classification
- Kingdom: Animalia
- Phylum: Arthropoda
- Class: Insecta
- Order: Lepidoptera
- Family: Crambidae
- Genus: Diatraea
- Species: D. castrensis

Binomial name
- Diatraea castrensis Dyar & Heinrich, 1927

Species of moth

Diatraea castrensis is a moth in the family Crambidae. It was described by Harrison Gray Dyar Jr. and Carl Heinrich in 1927. It is found in Paraná, Brazil.
