= Diatraea lativittalis =

Scientific classification
- Domain: Eukaryota
- Kingdom: Animalia
- Phylum: Arthropoda
- Class: Insecta
- Order: Lepidoptera
- Family: Crambidae
- Genus: Diatraea
- Species: D. lativittalis

Binomial name
- Diatraea lativittalis (Dognin, 1910)

Synonyms
- Chilo lativittalis Dognin, 1910; Chilo latmiadelis Dognin, 1923; Diatraea obliqualis Hampson, 1919

Species of moth

Diatraea lativittalis is a moth in the family Crambidae. It was described by Paul Dognin in 1910. It is found in Argentina.
