= Nothomyia flavipes =

Scientific classification
- Kingdom: Animalia
- Phylum: Arthropoda
- Clade: Pancrustacea
- Class: Insecta
- Order: Diptera
- Family: Stratiomyidae
- Subfamily: Stratiomyinae
- Tribe: Prosopochrysini
- Genus: Nothomyia
- Species: N. flavipes

Binomial name
- Nothomyia flavipes James, 1977

Species of fly

Nothomyia flavipes is a species of soldier fly in the family Stratiomyidae.

== Distribution ==
Jamaica.
