= Diatraea maronialis =

Scientific classification
- Domain: Eukaryota
- Kingdom: Animalia
- Phylum: Arthropoda
- Class: Insecta
- Order: Lepidoptera
- Family: Crambidae
- Genus: Diatraea
- Species: D. maronialis

Binomial name
- Diatraea maronialis Schaus, 1922

Synonyms
- Diatraea umbrialis Schaus, 1922

Species of moth

Diatraea maronialis is a moth in the family Crambidae. It was described by Schaus in 1922. It is found in French Guiana.
