= Peniculimius marginata =

Scientific classification
- Kingdom: Animalia
- Phylum: Arthropoda
- Clade: Pancrustacea
- Class: Insecta
- Order: Lepidoptera
- Family: Crambidae
- Subfamily: Crambinae
- Tribe: Diptychophorini
- Genus: Peniculimius
- Species: P. marginata

Binomial name
- Peniculimius marginata (Gaskin, 1974)

Synonyms
- Pareromene marginata Gaskin, 1974

Species of moth

Peniculimius marginata is a moth in the family Crambidae. It was described by David E. Gaskin in 1974. It is found in Sarawak, Malaysia.
