= Diatraea tabernella =

Scientific classification
- Kingdom: Animalia
- Phylum: Arthropoda
- Class: Insecta
- Order: Lepidoptera
- Family: Crambidae
- Genus: Diatraea
- Species: D. tabernella

Binomial name
- Diatraea tabernella Dyar, 1911

Species of moth

Diatraea tabernella is a moth in the family Crambidae. It was described by Harrison Gray Dyar Jr. in 1911. It is found in Panama.
