= Diatraea magnifactella =

Scientific classification
- Domain: Eukaryota
- Kingdom: Animalia
- Phylum: Arthropoda
- Class: Insecta
- Order: Lepidoptera
- Family: Crambidae
- Genus: Diatraea
- Species: D. magnifactella

Binomial name
- Diatraea magnifactella Dyar, 1911

Species of moth

Diatraea magnifactella is a moth in the family Crambidae. It was described by Harrison Gray Dyar Jr. in 1911. It is found in Orizaba, Mexico.
