= Diatraea gaga =

Scientific classification
- Kingdom: Animalia
- Phylum: Arthropoda
- Class: Insecta
- Order: Lepidoptera
- Family: Crambidae
- Genus: Diatraea
- Species: D. gaga

Binomial name
- Diatraea gaga Dyar, 1914

Synonyms
- Diatraea solipsa Dyar, 1914; Diatraea savannarum Box, 1935

Species of moth

Diatraea gaga is a moth in the family Crambidae. It was described by Harrison Gray Dyar Jr. in 1914. It is found in Panama and Guyana.
