= Diatraea indigenella =

Scientific classification
- Kingdom: Animalia
- Phylum: Arthropoda
- Class: Insecta
- Order: Lepidoptera
- Family: Crambidae
- Genus: Diatraea
- Species: D. indigenella

Binomial name
- Diatraea indigenella Dyar & Heinrich, 1927

Species of moth

Diatraea indigenella is a moth in the family Crambidae. It was described by Harrison Gray Dyar Jr. and Carl Heinrich in 1927. It is found in Colombia.
