= Thopeutis forbesellus =

Scientific classification
- Domain: Eukaryota
- Kingdom: Animalia
- Phylum: Arthropoda
- Class: Insecta
- Order: Lepidoptera
- Family: Crambidae
- Subfamily: Crambinae
- Tribe: Haimbachiini
- Genus: Thopeutis
- Species: T. forbesellus

Binomial name
- Thopeutis forbesellus (Fernald, 1896)

Synonyms
- Chilo forbesellus Fernald, 1896

Species of moth

Thopeutis forbesellus is a moth in the family Crambidae. It was described by Charles H. Fernald in 1896. It is found in North America, where it has been recorded in California, Illinois, Indiana, Louisiana, Maine, Maryland, Massachusetts, Minnesota, New Brunswick, Ohio, Ontario, Quebec and South Carolina.

The wingspan is about 30 mm. Adults are on wing from April to August.
