= Diatraea andina =

Scientific classification
- Domain: Eukaryota
- Kingdom: Animalia
- Phylum: Arthropoda
- Class: Insecta
- Order: Lepidoptera
- Family: Crambidae
- Genus: Diatraea
- Species: D. andina

Binomial name
- Diatraea andina Box, 1951

Species of moth

Diatraea andina is a moth in the family Crambidae. It was described by Harold Edmund Box in 1951. It is found in Venezuela.
