= Diatraea lentistrialis =

Scientific classification
- Kingdom: Animalia
- Phylum: Arthropoda
- Class: Insecta
- Order: Lepidoptera
- Family: Crambidae
- Genus: Diatraea
- Species: D. lentistrialis

Binomial name
- Diatraea lentistrialis Hampson, 1919

Synonyms
- Diatraea silvicola Box, 1951

Species of moth

Diatraea lentistrialis is a moth in the family Crambidae. It was described by George Hampson in 1919. It is found in Argentina and Venezuela.
