= Diatraea centrellus =

Scientific classification
- Domain: Eukaryota
- Kingdom: Animalia
- Phylum: Arthropoda
- Class: Insecta
- Order: Lepidoptera
- Family: Crambidae
- Genus: Diatraea
- Species: D. centrellus

Binomial name
- Diatraea centrellus (Möschler, 1883)

Synonyms
- Chilo centrellus Möschler, 1883; Diatraea canella Hampson, 1895; Phalaena sacchari Sepp, [1848]; Diatraea amnemonella Dyar, 1911; Diatraea anathericola Dyar & Heinrich, 1927; Diatraea amazonica Box, 1931

Species of moth

Diatraea centrellus is a moth in the family Crambidae. It was described by Heinrich Benno Möschler in 1883. It is found in Grenada, Suriname, French Guiana and Brazil.
