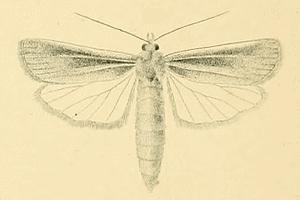

Scientific classification
- Domain: Eukaryota
- Kingdom: Animalia
- Phylum: Arthropoda
- Class: Insecta
- Order: Lepidoptera
- Family: Crambidae
- Subfamily: Crambinae
- Tribe: Haimbachiini
- Genus: Thopeutis
- Species: T. galleriellus

Binomial name
- Thopeutis galleriellus (Ragonot, 1892)

Synonyms
- Cephis galleriellus Ragonot, 1892; Thopeutis galleriella; Archigalleria buxtoni Rothschild, 1921; Cephis chretienellus Dumont, 1930; Chilo hederalis Amsel, 1935; Chilo maculalis Predota, 1934; Chilo foeminalis Dyar, 1906; Chilo masculinalis Dyar, 1906; Nephopteryx seminivella Walker, 1866; Chilo submedianalis Hampson, 1919; Hombergia unicolor de Joannis, 1910; Stenochilo canicostalis Hampson, 1896

= Thopeutis galleriellus =

Species of moth

Thopeutis galleriellus is a species of moth in the family Crambidae. It is found in Spain, France, Romania, Ukraine, Russia, North Africa, the Near East, India, Sri Lanka, Iran and Iraq.
