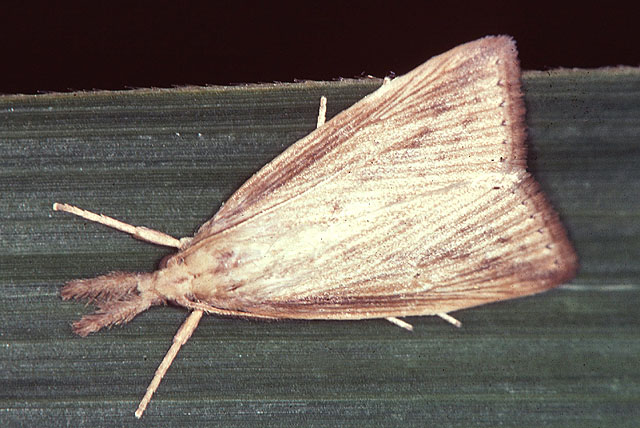

Scientific classification
- Kingdom: Animalia
- Phylum: Arthropoda
- Class: Insecta
- Order: Lepidoptera
- Family: Crambidae
- Genus: Diatraea
- Species: D. saccharalis

Binomial name
- Diatraea saccharalis (Fabricius, 1794)

Synonyms
- Phalaena saccharalis Fabricius, 1794; Phalaena sacchari Fabricius, 1798; Diatraea sacchari (Fabricius, 1798); Chilo obliteratellus Zeller, 1863; Crambus leucaniellus Walker, 1863; Crambus lineosellus Walker, 1863; Diatraea brasiliensis Gorkum & Waal, 1913; Diatraea continens Dyar, 1911; Diatraea incomparella Dyar & Heinrich, 1927; Diatraea pedidocta Dyar, 1911; Diatraea saccharalis var. grenadensis Dyar, 1911

= Diatraea saccharalis =

Sugarcane borer

Species of moth

Diatraea saccharalis, the sugarcane borer, is a species of moth of the family Crambidae. It was described by Johan Christian Fabricius in 1794. It is native to the Caribbean, Central America, and the warmer parts of South America south to northern Argentina. It was introduced to Louisiana in about 1855, and has since spread to the other Gulf Coast states.

The wingspan is 18–28 mm for males and 27–39 mm.

The larvae are considered a pest on sugarcane and other crops such as corn, rice, sorghum and Sudangrass. Other food plants include Sorghum halepense, Paspalum, Panicum, Holcus and Andropogon.

== Gallery ==
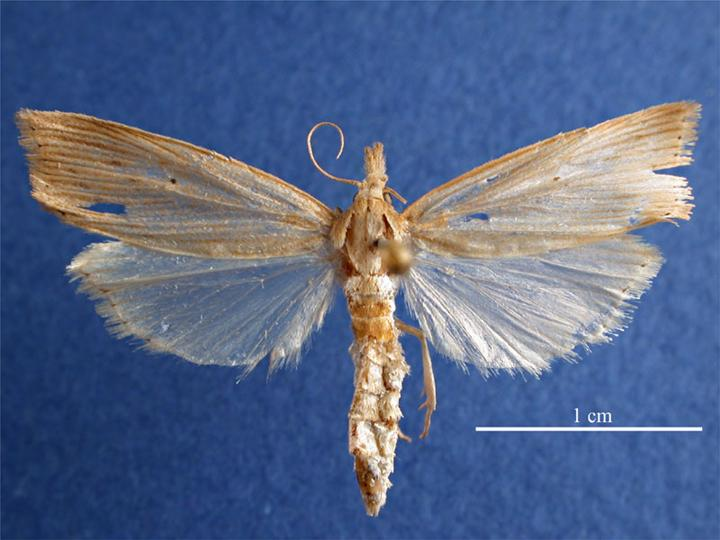
Female, dorsal view

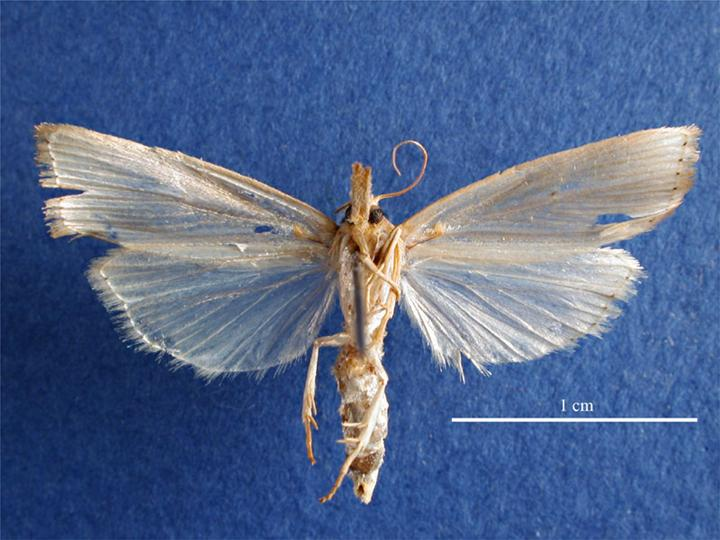
Female, ventral view

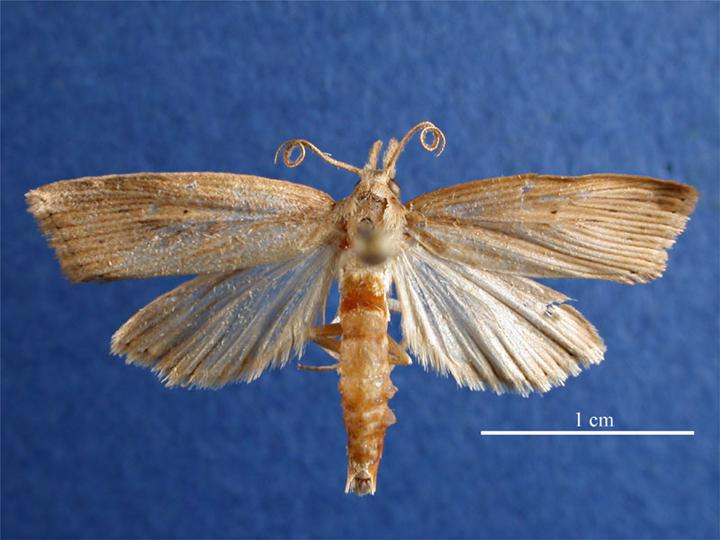
Male, dorsal view

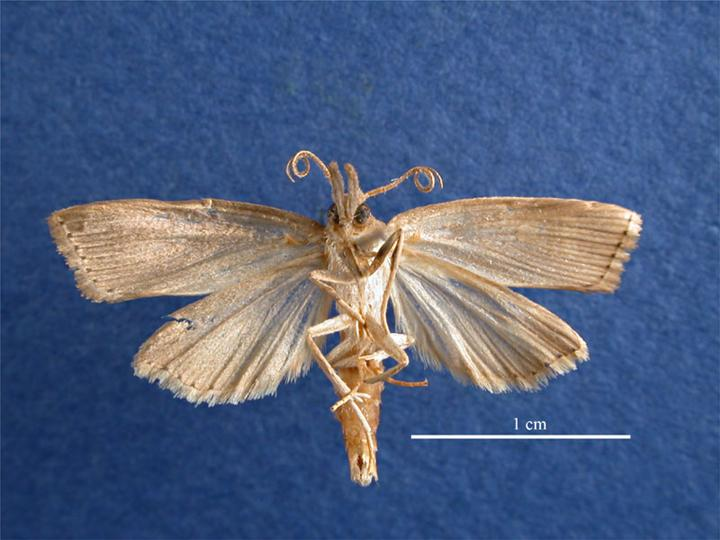
Male, ventral view
