= Yoshiyasu =

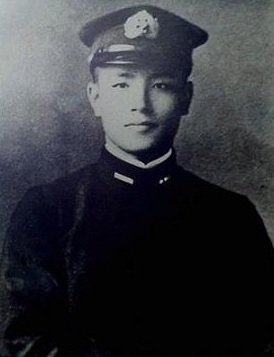
- Yoshiyasu Kuno (1921–1944), Japanese pilot
- Pronunciation: joɕijasɯ (IPA)
- Gender: Male

Origin
- Origin: Japanese
- Meaning: Different meanings depending on the kanji used

Other names
- Alternative spelling: Yosiyasu (Kunrei-shiki) Yosiyasu (Nihon-shiki) Yoshiyasu (Hepburn)

Yoshiyasu is a masculine Japanese given name.

== Written forms ==
Yoshiyasu can be written using many different combinations of kanji characters. Here are some examples:

- 義康, "justice, healthy"
- 義安, "justice, peaceful"
- 義靖, "justice, peaceful"
- 義泰, "justice, peaceful"
- 義保, "justice, preserve"
- 吉康, "good luck, healthy"
- 吉安, "good luck, peaceful"
- 吉靖, "good luck, peaceful"
- 吉泰, "good luck, peaceful"
- 吉保, "good luck, preserve"
- 善康, "virtuous, healthy"
- 善安, "virtuous, peaceful"
- 善靖, "virtuous, peaceful"
- 善泰, "virtuous, peaceful"
- 善保, "virtuous, preserve"
- 芳康, "virtuous, healthy"
- 芳安, "virtuous/fragrant, peaceful"
- 芳靖, "virtuous/fragrant, peaceful"
- 芳泰, "virtuous/fragrant, peaceful"
- 芳保, "virtuous/fragrant, preserve"
- 好孚, "good/like something, sincere"
- 慶保, "congratulate, preserve"

The name can also be written in hiragana よしやす or katakana ヨシヤス.

== Notable people with the name ==
- Yoshiyasu Gomi (五味 芳保; born 1933), Japanese speed skater
- Yoshiyasu Kuno (久納 好孚, 1921–1944), the first Japanese pilot in World War II to fly a kamikaze mission
- Yoshiyasu Maeda (前田 慶寧; 1830–1874), Japanese daimyō
- Yoshiyasu Minamoto (源 義康; died 1157), Japanese samurai
- Yoshiyasu Suzuka (鈴鹿 芳康; born 1947), Japanese photographer
- Yoshiyasu Yanagisawa (柳沢 吉保; 1658–1714), Japanese samurai and daimyō
