= Steneromene =

Scientific classification
- Kingdom: Animalia
- Phylum: Arthropoda
- Clade: Pancrustacea
- Class: Insecta
- Order: Lepidoptera
- Family: Crambidae
- Subfamily: Crambinae
- Tribe: Diptychophorini
- Genus: Steneromene; Gaskin, 1986

Genus of moths

Steneromene is a grass moth genus (family Crambidae) of subfamily Crambinae, tribe Diptychophorini. Some authors have placed it in the snout moth family (Pyralidae), where all grass moths were once also included, but this seems to be in error.

== Species ==
- Steneromene azanalis (Walker, 1859)
- Steneromene nymphocharis (Meyrick, 1932)
