= Alphacrambus =

Scientific classification
- Kingdom: Animalia
- Phylum: Arthropoda
- Clade: Pancrustacea
- Class: Insecta
- Order: Lepidoptera
- Family: Crambidae
- Tribe: Crambini
- Genus: Alphacrambus; Bassi, 1995

Genus of moths

Alphacrambus is a grass moth genus (family Crambidae) of subfamily Crambinae, tribe Crambini. Some authors have placed it in the snout moth family (Pyralidae), where all grass moths were once also included, but this seems to be in error.

== Species ==
- Alphacrambus cristatus Bassi, 1995
- Alphacrambus parvus Bassi, 1995
- Alphacrambus phoeostrigellus (Hampson, 1903)
- Alphacrambus prodontellus (Hampson, 1919)
- Alphacrambus razowskii (Bleszynski, 1961)
