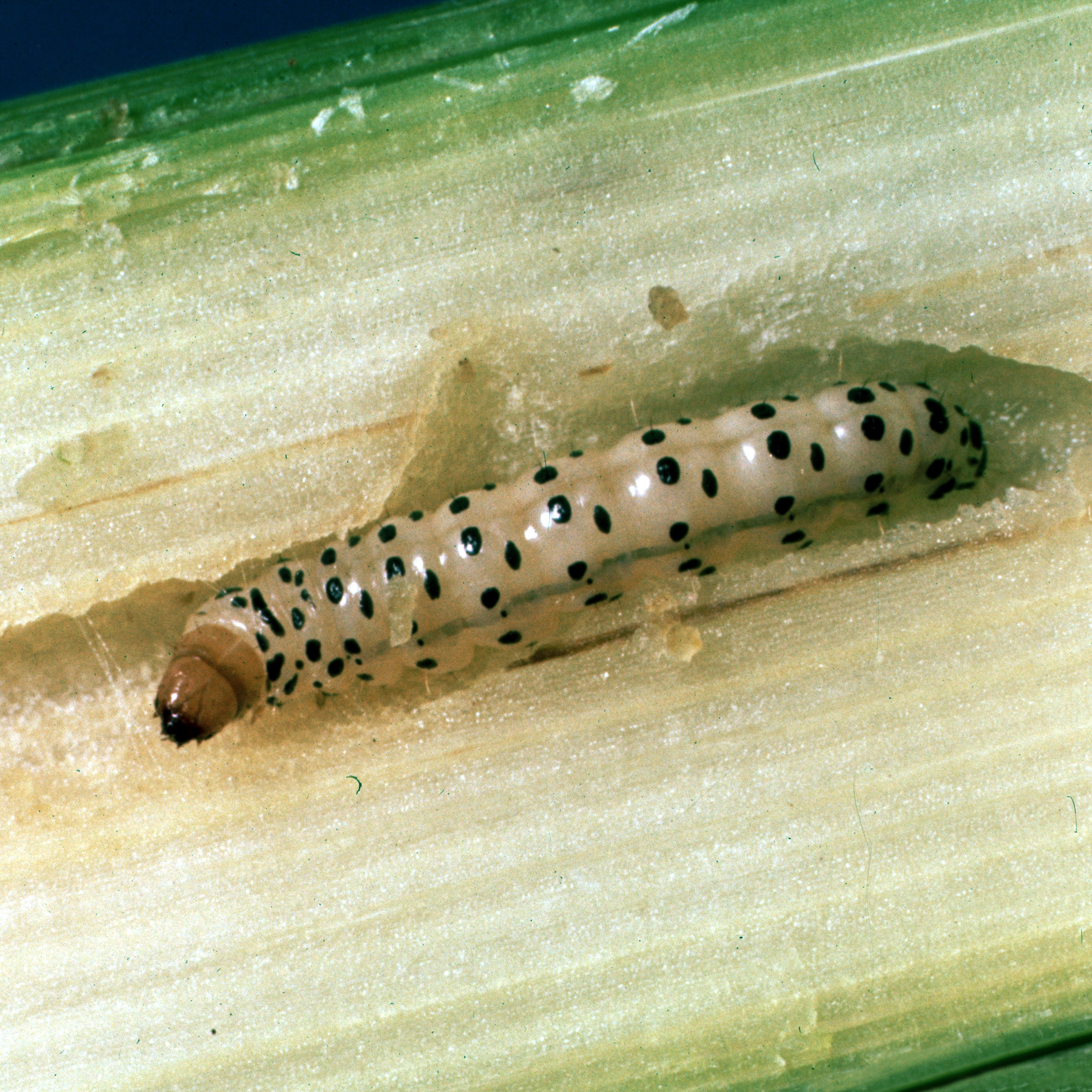
- Larva

Scientific classification
- Kingdom: Animalia
- Phylum: Arthropoda
- Class: Insecta
- Order: Lepidoptera
- Family: Crambidae
- Genus: Diatraea
- Species: D. crambidoides

Binomial name
- Diatraea crambidoides (Grote, 1880)

Synonyms
- Chilo crambidoides Grote, 1880; Diatraea tripsacicola Dyar, 1921; Diatraea zeacolella Dyar, 1911

= Diatraea crambidoides =

Southern cornstalk borer moth

Species of moth

Diatraea crambidoides, the southern cornstalk borer moth, is a species of moth of the family Crambidae described by Augustus Radcliffe Grote in 1880. It is found in North America, from Alabama and northern Florida to Ohio and Maryland. Its wingspan is 15–40 mm.

The larvae feed on Zea mays, Tripsacum dactyloides and Sorghum species.
