= Peniculimius =

Scientific classification
- Kingdom: Animalia
- Phylum: Arthropoda
- Clade: Pancrustacea
- Class: Insecta
- Order: Lepidoptera
- Family: Crambidae
- Subfamily: Crambinae
- Tribe: Diptychophorini
- Genus: Peniculimius; Schouten, 1994

Genus of moths

Peniculimius is a grass moth genus (family Crambidae) of subfamily Crambinae; its relationships within the latter group remain obscure. Some authors have placed it in the snout moth family (Pyralidae), where all grass moths were once also included, but this seems to be in error.

== Species ==
- Peniculimius acehi Schouten, 1994
- Peniculimius api Schouten, 1994
- Peniculimius captus Schouten, 1994
- Peniculimius crassus Schouten, 1994
- Peniculimius fructus Schouten, 1994
- Peniculimius marginata Gaskin, 1974
- Peniculimius moorei Gaskin, 1974
- Peniculimius ravus Schouten, 1994
