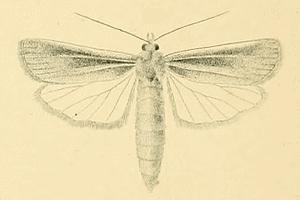
- Thopeutis galleriellus

Scientific classification
- Kingdom: Animalia
- Phylum: Arthropoda
- Clade: Pancrustacea
- Class: Insecta
- Order: Lepidoptera
- Family: Crambidae
- Tribe: Haimbachiini
- Genus: Thopeutis; Hübner, 1818

Synonyms
- Cephis Ragonot in Staudinger, 1892; Hombergia de Joannis, 1910; Stenochilo Hampson, 1896; Tetrachila Hübner, 1808; Topeutis Hübner, 1825

= Thopeutis =

Genus of moths

Thopeutis is a grass moth genus (family Crambidae) of subfamily Crambinae, tribe Haimbachiini. Some authors have placed it in the snout moth family (Pyralidae), where all grass moths were once also included, but this seems to be in error.

== Species ==
- Thopeutis diatraealis (Dyar, 1910)
- Thopeutis diffusifascia (Hampson, 1919)
- Thopeutis forbesellus (Fernald, 1896)
- Thopeutis galleriellus (Ragonot in Staudinger, 1892)
- Thopeutis respersalis Hübner, 1818
- Thopeutis xylinalis (Hampson, 1896)
