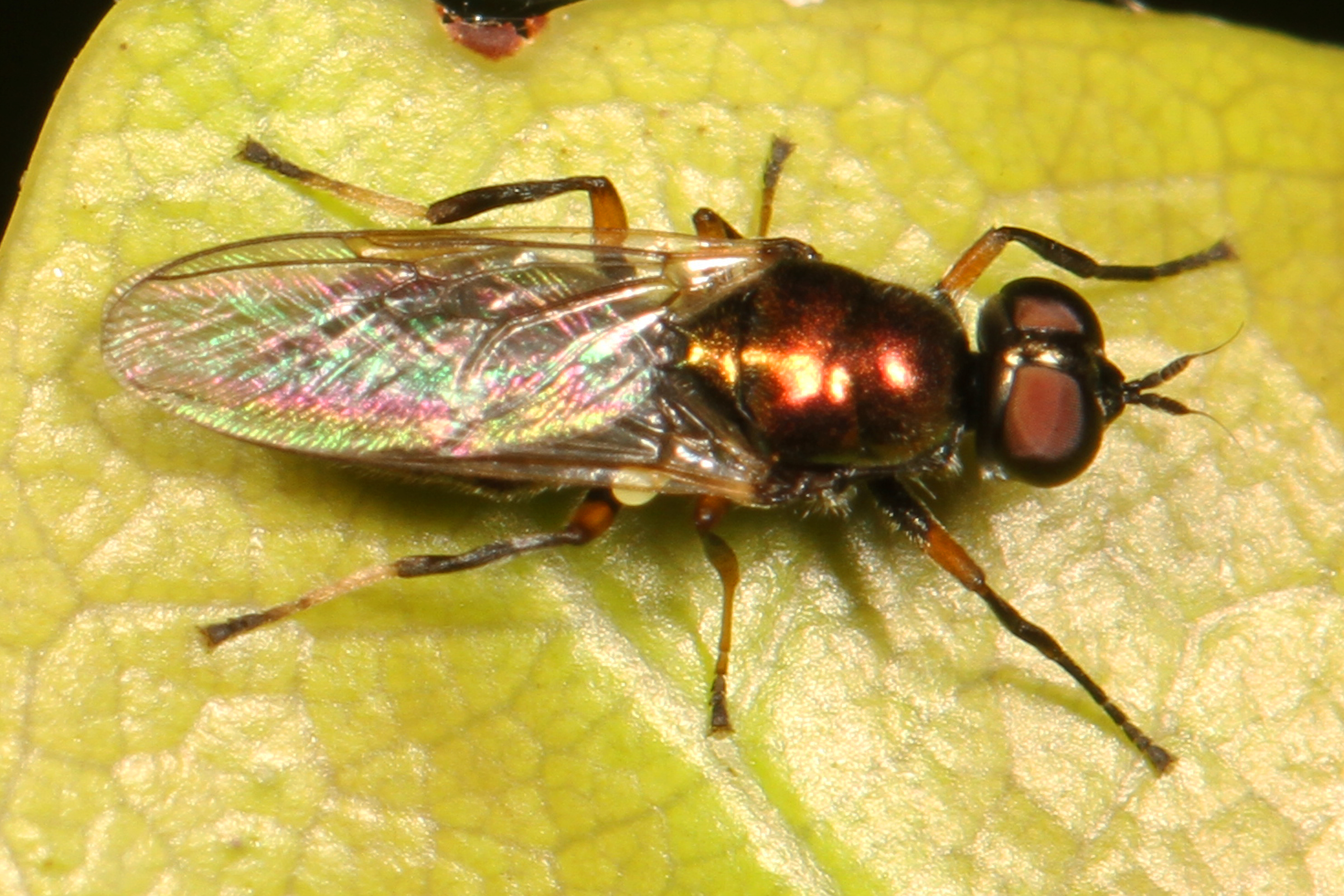
- Nothomyia calopus

Scientific classification
- Kingdom: Animalia
- Phylum: Arthropoda
- Class: Insecta
- Order: Diptera
- Family: Stratiomyidae
- Subfamily: Stratiomyinae
- Tribe: Prosopochrysini
- Genus: Nothomyia; Loew, 1869

Type species
- Nothomyia scutellata Loew, 1869

Synonyms
- Berisargus Lindner, 1933; Pseudoberis Enderlein, 1921; Melanochroa Brauer, 1882

= Nothomyia =

Genus of flies

Nothomyia is a genus of flies in the family Stratiomyidae.

== Species ==
- Nothomyia alticola James, 1977
- Nothomyia bicolor Hollis, 1963
- Nothomyia borgmeieri (Lindner, 1933)
- Nothomyia brevis (Bigot, 1887)
- Nothomyia calopus Loew, 1869
- Nothomyia dubia (Brauer, 1882)
- Nothomyia elongoverpa Yang, Wei & Yang, 2012
- Nothomyia fallax (Enderlein, 1921)
- Nothomyia fasciatipennis (Lindner, 1935)
- Nothomyia flavipes James, 1977
- Nothomyia intensica (Curran, 1928)
- Nothomyia longisetosa (Lindner, 1933)
- Nothomyia lopesi (Lindner, 1935)
- Nothomyia metallica (Wiedemann, 1830)
- Nothomyia nigra James, 1942
- Nothomyia parvicornis James, 1939
- Nothomyia scutellata Loew, 1869
- Nothomyia viridis Hine, 1911
- Nothomyia woodruffi James, 1977
- Nothomyia yunnanensis Yang, Wei & Yang, 2012
