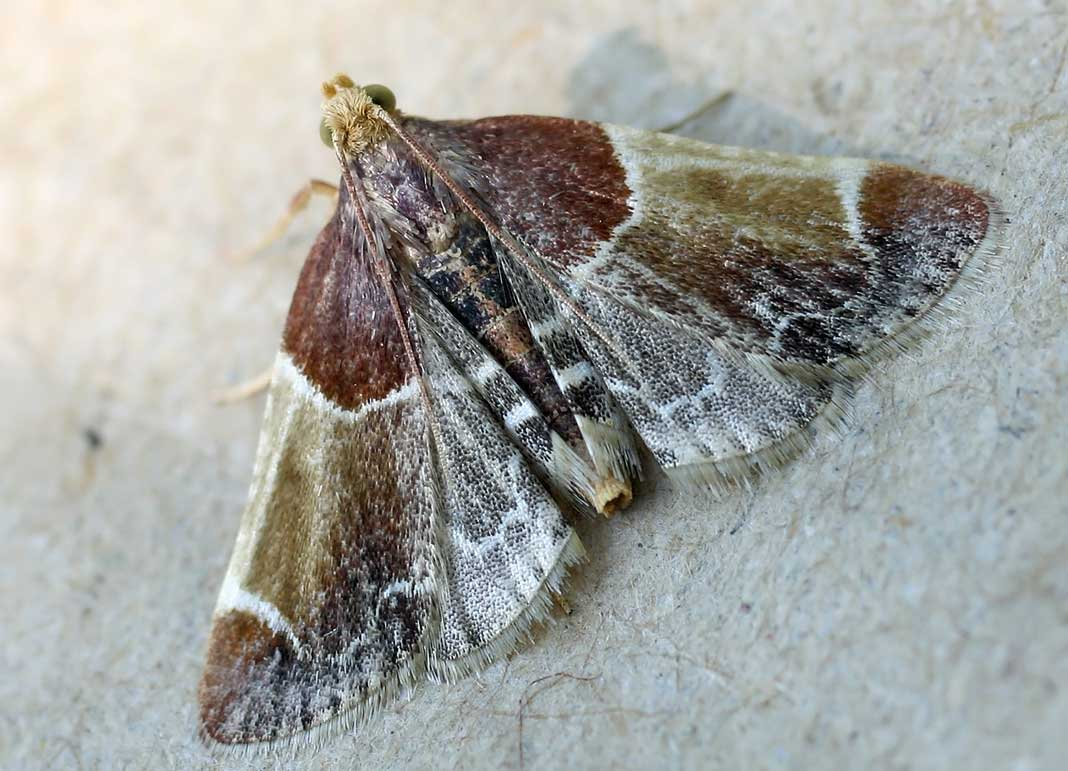
- Meal moth (Pyralis farinalis)

Scientific classification
- Kingdom: Animalia
- Phylum: Arthropoda
- Clade: Pancrustacea
- Class: Insecta
- Order: Lepidoptera
- Superfamily: Pyraloidea
- Family: Pyralidae; Latreille, 1809

Type species
- Pyralis farinalis Linnaeus, 1758

Subfamilies
- Chrysauginae; Epipaschiinae; Galleriinae; Phycitinae; Pyralinae

Diversity
- c. 6,150 species

= Pyralidae =

Snout moths

Family of moths

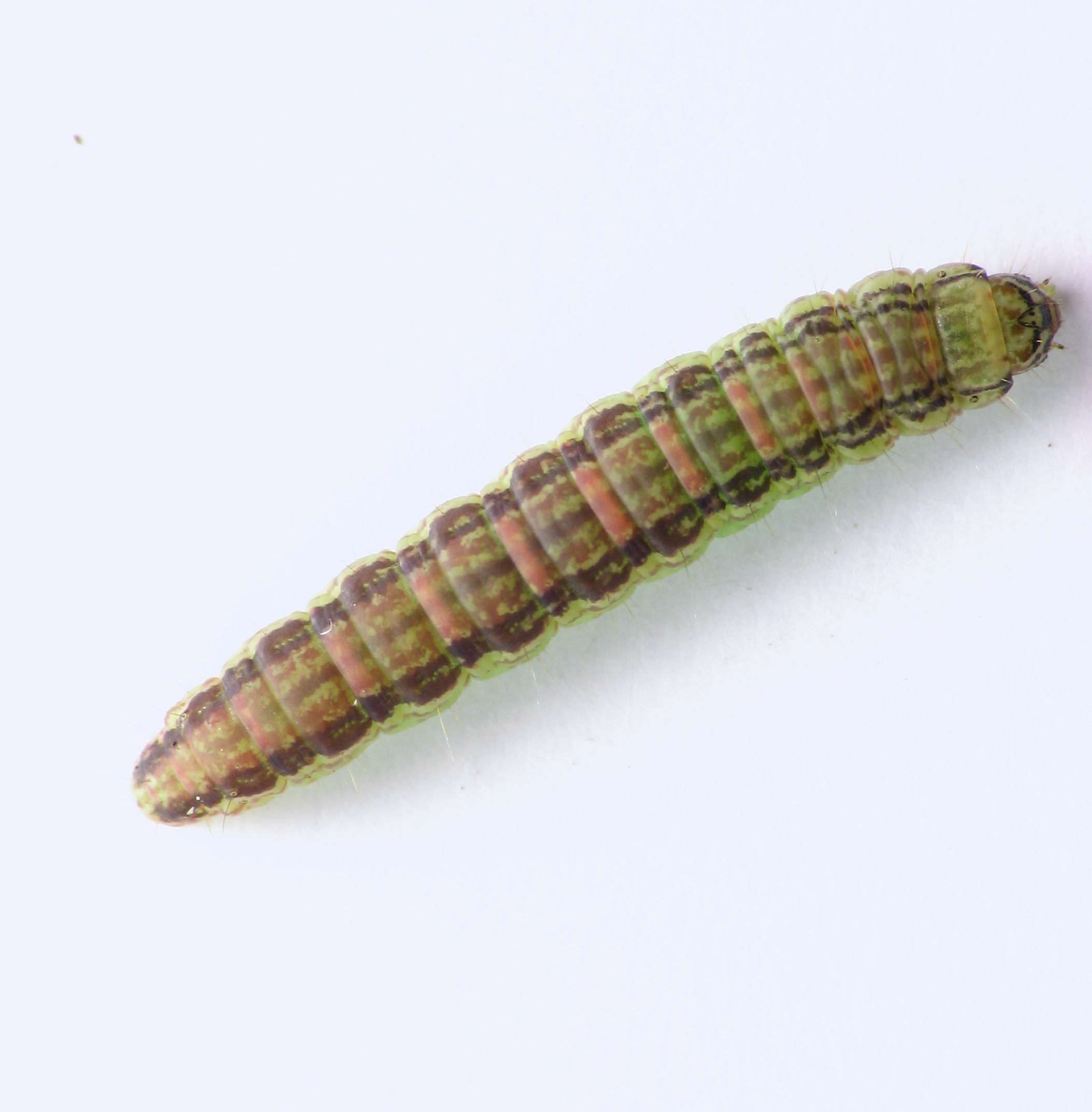
Sciota uvinella, larva found on sweetgum

The Pyralidae, commonly called pyralid moths, snout moths or grass moths, are a family of Lepidoptera in the ditrysian superfamily Pyraloidea. In many (particularly older) classifications, the grass moths (Crambidae) are included in the Pyralidae as a subfamily, making the combined group one of the largest families in the Lepidoptera. The latest review by Eugene G. Munroe and Maria Alma Solis retain the Crambidae as a full family of Pyraloidea.

The wingspans for small and medium-sized species are usually between 9 and 37 mm (0.35 and 1.46 in) with variable morphological features.

It is a diverse group, with more than 6,000 species described worldwide, and more than 600 species in America north of Mexico, comprising the third largest moth family in North America. At least 42 species have been recorded from North Dakota in the subfamilies of Pyralidae.

== Relationship with humans ==
Most of these small moths are inconspicuous. Many are economically important pests, including waxworms, which are the caterpillar larvae of the greater (Galleria mellonella) and lesser (Achroia grisella) wax moths (subfamily Galleriinae). They are natively pests of beehives, but are bred indoors in enormous numbers as live food for small reptile and bird pets and similar animals. They are also used as fishing bait for trout fishing.

Other notable snout moth pests relevant for their larval hosts include:

- Alligatorweed stem borer (Arcola malloi: Phycitinae) – biological control of alligator weed (Alternanthera philoxeroides).
- Almond moth (Cadra cautella: Phycitinae) – pest of stored cereals and dry fruit; now introduced almost worldwide.
- Cacao moth, tobacco moth, warehouse moth (Ephestia elutella: Phycitinae) – pest of stored dry vegetable products; Europe, introduced to some other regions (e.g. Australia).
- Dried fruit moth (Cadra calidella: Phycitinae)
- Etiella behrii (Phycitinae) – pest of stored legumes; Southeast Asia and Australia
- "Flour moths" – pests of stored grains, spices, flour, and similar dry vegetable products; now introduced almost worldwide.
  - Indian mealmoth (Plodia interpunctella: Phycitinae)
  - Mediterranean flour moth, Indian flour moth (Ephestia kuehniella: Phycitinae)
- Grease moth (Aglossa pinguinalis: Pyralinae) – pest of suet and other oily food.
- Lesser cornstalk borer (Elasmopalpus lignosellus: Phycitinae) – stalk pest of corn (Zea mays); tropical and subtropical Americas, introduced to the Hawaiian Islands.
- Locust bean moth (Ectomyelois ceratoniae: Phycitinae)
- Mahogany webworm (Macalla thyrsisalis: Epipaschiinae) – defoliator pest of mahogany trees (Swietenia); Neotropics.
- Meal moth (Pyralis farinalis: Pyralinae) – pest of stored grain, flour and other cereals; now introduced almost worldwide.
- Pear fruit borer (Pempelia heringii: Phycitinae) – pest of apple and pear fruits; East Asia, introduced to the Hawaiian Islands.
- Pine webworm (Pococera robustella: Epipaschiinae) – defoliator pest of pines (Pinus); North America east of Great Lakes region.
- Raisin moth (Cadra figulilella: Phycitinae) – pests of stored dry fruit; now introduced almost worldwide.
- Rice moth (Corcyra cephalonica: Galleriinae) – pest of stored grain, flour and other cereals.
- South American cactus moth (Cactoblastis cactorum: Phycitinae) – biological control of prickly pears (Opuntia).
- Southern pine coneworm, "pitch moth" (Dioryctria amatella: Phycitinae) – cone and shoot pest of pines (Pinus); southern North America.
- Stored nut moth (Paralipsa gularis: Galleriinae) – pest of stored nuts and drupes; Southeast Asia, introduced to Western Europe.
- Sunflower moth (Homoeosoma nebulella: Phycitinae) – pest of sunflower seeds; Europe and surrounding regions.

The European corn borer (Ostrinia nubilalis) and southern cornstalk borer (Diatraea crambidoides), formerly considered snout moths, are placed in the Crambidae which, as noted above, are usually regarded as a separate family today.

== Systematics ==
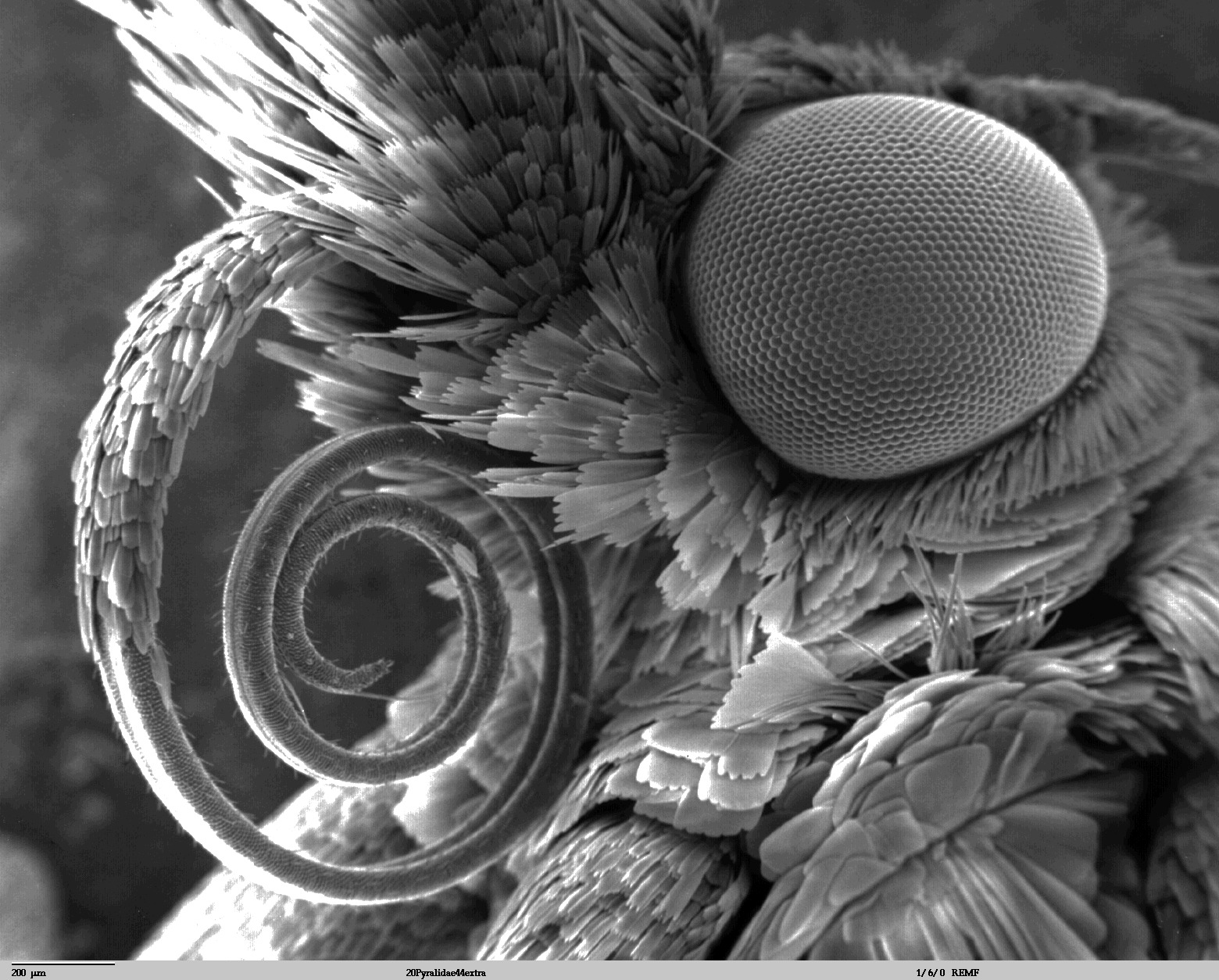
SEM microphoto of the head of a snout moth – note the "snout" (labial palps) extending to the upper left above the proboscis

Five subfamilies are generally recognized in the Pyralidae today. The Acentropinae (= Nymphulinae), occasionally still placed here, do indeed seem to belong in the Crambidae.

The snout moth subfamilies are, listed in the presumed phylogenetic sequence from the most primitive to the most advanced:

- Chrysauginae (including Bradypodicolinae, Semniidae) – about 400 species occurring predominantly in the Neotropical region. Larvae typically feed on plants, but some have more unusual feeding habits. The latter include for example some myrmecophilous species, as well as a number of sloth moths which are dependent on sloths for their entire life cycle. Most Chrysauginae larvae have a sclerotised ring around seta SD1 of the metathorax.
- Galleriinae (including Macrothecinae) – about 300 species worldwide. The males of galleriine moths have a gnathos almost or completely reduced, the pupae have a prominent dorsal median ridge on the thorax and abdomen, and most larvae have a sclerotised ring around seta SD1 of the first abdominal segment.
- Pyralinae (including Endotrichinae, Hypotiinae) – rather diverse in the Old World; a lesser number of the roughly 900 species occurs elsewhere. The females of almost all Pyralinae except Cardamyla and Embryoglossa are recognizable by the very short ductus bursae of their genitals.
- Epipaschiinae (including Pococerinae) – over 550 described species in the tropical and temperate regions (except Europe). Larvae are leaf rollers, leaf tiers, or leaf miners. Some species are minor pests of a few commercial crops. Epipaschiinae are generally hard to recognize, except in the case of adult males which have a few characteristic traits, such as the upturned and pointed third segment of the labial palps and usually a scaly projection from the antenna base. The larvae lack any stereotyped seta sclerotisations.
- Phycitinae (including Anerastiinae, Peoriinae) – probably the most difficult group of Pyraloidea in terms of identification and classification. They comprise more than 600 genera and about 4000 species found all over the world. The characteristic trait of the caterpillars is a sclerotised area encircling the base of seta SD1 on the mesothorax, while the adult females have – like the males of Pyralidae in general do – a frenulum consisting of a single bristle which in turn is composed of multiple acanthae.

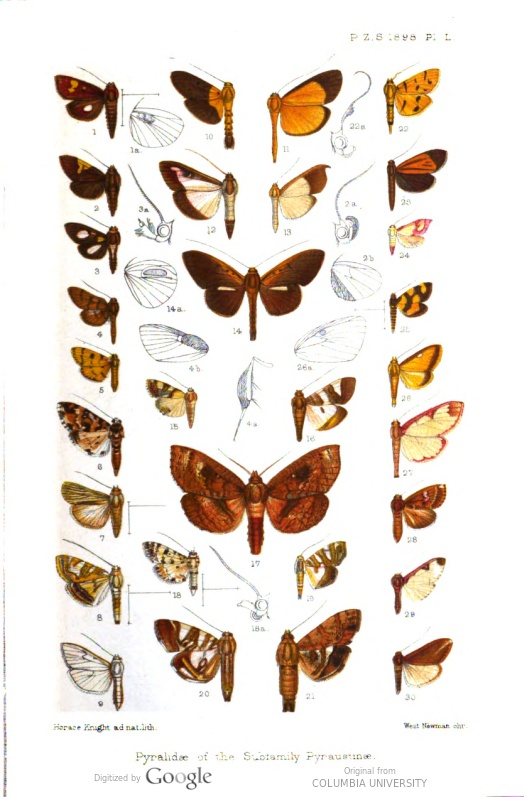
Specimens described by George Hampson in 1899, including some problematic genera.

=== Problematic genera ===
In addition to those assigned to the tribes above, several genera of (presumed) Pyralidae are not firmly placed in this arrangement, but are incertae sedis. Some may be very basal lineages which stand outside the main snout moth radiations, but given the changing circumscription of the Pyralidae, some are likely to be placed outside this group in its modern meaning, either in the Crambidae or in other lineages of basal Obtectomera. Some may even belong to more ancient moth lineages, such as the Alucitoidea or Pterophoroidea. Finally, some of these (usually little-studied) genera possibly are junior synonyms of genera described earlier. These genera are in the unranked category of the family Pyralidae.

The genera in question are:

- Apocabimoides Neunzig & Goodson, 1992
- Ardjuna Roesler & Küppers, 1979
- Cabimoides Neunzig & Goodson, 1992
- Cryptophycita Roesler & Küppers, 1979
- Cryptozophera Roesler & Küppers, 1979
- Delcina Clarke, 1986 (Phycitinae?)
- Eupassadena Neunzig & Goodson, 1992
- Gomezmenoria Agenjo, 1966
- Gunungodes Roesler & Küppers, 1981
- Indocabnia Roesler & Küppers, 1981
- Inverina Neunzig & Goodson, 1992
- Kasyapa Roesler & Küppers, 1981
- Kaurava Roesler & Küppers, 1981
- Kumbhakarna Roesler & Küppers, 1981
- Merangiria Roesler & Küppers, 1979
- Ohigginsia Neunzig & Goodson, 1992
- Pseudopassadena Neunzig & Goodson, 1992
- Psorozophera Roesler & Küppers, 1979

These genera have been placed in the Pyralidae when these were still circumscribed sensu lato and are sometimes still treated thus, but actually they seem to belong in the Crambidae (see also Micronix and Tanaobela):

- Alphacrambus Bassi, 1995
- Peniculimius Schoute, 1994
- Steneromene Gaskin, 1986
- Thopeutis Hübner, 1818
- Yoshiyasua (formerly Melanochroa Yohiyasu, 1985 nec Roeder, 1886: preoccupied)
