= List of Odontomyia species =

This is a list of species in Odontomyia, a genus of soldier flies in the family Stratiomyidae.

== Odontomyia species ==
- Odontomyia adusta Loew, 1857
- Odontomyia aequalis (Walker, 1861)
- Odontomyia africana (Lindner, 1943)
- Odontomyia albigenata (Lindner, 1935)
- Odontomyia albomaculata Macquart, 1838
- Odontomyia aldrichi Johnson, 1895
- Odontomyia alini Lindner, 1955
- Odontomyia alolena (Séguy, 1930)
- Odontomyia altifrons Wulp, 1888
- Odontomyia americana Day, 1882
- Odontomyia amyris Walker, 1849
- Odontomyia anchorata Bigot, 1879
- Odontomyia angulata (Panzer, 1798)
- Odontomyia angusta Walker, 1854
- Odontomyia angustilimbata Brunetti, 1923
- Odontomyia annulata (Meigen, 1822)
- Odontomyia annulipes Macquart, 1850
- Odontomyia araneifera Schiner, 1868
- Odontomyia arcuata Loew, 1872
- Odontomyia argentata (Fabricius, 1794)
- Odontomyia aterrima Walker, 1856
- Odontomyia atraria (Walker, 1865)
- Odontomyia atrodorsalis James, 1941
- Odontomyia atrovirens Bigot, 1879
- Odontomyia aurata Meijere, 1911
- Odontomyia aureovestis (James, 1948)
- Odontomyia aureovittata Curran, 1928
- Odontomyia australensis Schiner, 1868
- Odontomyia azurea Becker, 1909
- Odontomyia bahamensis (James, 1953)
- Odontomyia barbata (Lindner, 1940)
- Odontomyia bekily Woodley, 2001
- Odontomyia bermudensis Johnson, 1914
- Odontomyia bifascia (Walker, 1861)
- Odontomyia bimaculata Yang, 1995
- Odontomyia bipunctata Bigot, 1859
- Odontomyia bipunctifacies (Lindner, 1951)
- Odontomyia blastulaefrons (Lindner, 1939)
- Odontomyia boharti (James, 1948)
- Odontomyia borealis James, 1936
- Odontomyia brodiei (Cockerell, 1915)
- Odontomyia bulbifrons (James, 1950)
- Odontomyia calva Lindner, 1972
- Odontomyia carinata Macquart, 1846
- Odontomyia carinifacies Macquart, 1850
- Odontomyia carinifacies var. grandimaculata Hardy, 1920
- Odontomyia carnifacies var. minima Hardy, 1920
- Odontomyia carnifex (Gerstaecker, 1857)
- Odontomyia chathamensis Hutton, 1901
- Odontomyia chloris (Walker, 1854)
- Odontomyia chrysaner (James, 1948)
- Odontomyia cincta Olivier, 1811
- Odontomyia cinctilinea (Walker, 1861)
- Odontomyia clarifrons Lindner, 1972
- Odontomyia claripennis Thomson, 1869
- Odontomyia cohaerens Brunetti, 1923
- Odontomyia colei James, 1936
- Odontomyia collarti (Lindner, 1938)
- Odontomyia collina Hutton, 1901
- Odontomyia confertissima (Walker, 1858)
- Odontomyia confusa (Rossi, 1794)
- Odontomyia consobrina Macquart, 1848
- Odontomyia coreana (Pleske, 1928)
- Odontomyia cuthbertsoni (Lindner, 1937)
- Odontomyia cyanea Brunetti, 1920
- Odontomyia damascena Villeneuve, 1912
- Odontomyia decipiens (Guerin-Meneville, 1838)
- Odontomyia disciclara (Séguy, 1929)
- Odontomyia discolor Loew, 1846
- Odontomyia discolorata James, 1936
- Odontomyia disparina (Lindner, 1935)
- Odontomyia elisabethae Lindner, 1966
- Odontomyia emarginata Macquart, 1838
- Odontomyia evansi (James, 1957)
- Odontomyia excocta Walker, 1851
- Odontomyia exigua (Lindner, 1937)
- Odontomyia fangchengensis Yang, Gao & An, 2004
- Odontomyia fasciata Macquart, 1834
- Odontomyia fascipes Brunetti, 1923
- Odontomyia fastuosa (Bigot, 1884)
- Odontomyia fiebrigi (Lindner, 1976)
- Odontomyia filipjewi (Pleske, 1928)
- Odontomyia finalis (Walker, 1859)
- Odontomyia flava Day, 1882
- Odontomyia flavissima (Rossi, 1790)
- Odontomyia foveifrons Thomson, 1869
- Odontomyia frontalis Macquart, 1838
- Odontomyia fulminans Bezzi, 1928
- Odontomyia fulviceps (Walker, 1854)
- Odontomyia gagathina Bezzi, 1928
- Odontomyia garatas Walker, 1849
- Odontomyia guianae (Lindner, 1949)
- Odontomyia guizhouensis Yang, 1995
- Odontomyia halophila Wang, Perng & Ueng, 2007
- Odontomyia halophila Wang, Perng & Ueng, 2007
- Odontomyia herbacea Lindner, 1966
- Odontomyia herichsonii Hope, 1847
- Odontomyia heterogastra Bezzi, 1928
- Odontomyia hirayamae Matsumura, 1916
- Odontomyia hirtocculata James, 1936
- Odontomyia hoodiana Bigot, 1887
- Odontomyia hunteri (MacLeay, 1826)
- Odontomyia hydroleon (Linnaeus, 1758)
- Odontomyia hydroleonoides Johnson, 1895
- Odontomyia ialemus Walker, 1849
- Odontomyia icae (Lindner, 1941)
- Odontomyia idahoensis James, 1932
- Odontomyia immiscens (Walker, 1859)
- Odontomyia inaequalis Loew, 1866
- Odontomyia inanimis (Walker, 1857)
- Odontomyia interrupta Olivier, 1811
- Odontomyia jamesi Lindner, 1968
- Odontomyia kamande Woodley, 2001
- Odontomyia kashmirensis Brunetti, 1920
- Odontomyia kirchneri Jaennicke, 1867
- Odontomyia kiricenkoi (Pleske, 1922)
- Odontomyia lamborni (Lindner, 1937)
- Odontomyia lateremaculata Macquart, 1850
- Odontomyia limae Guerin, 1831
- Odontomyia limbata (Meigen & Wiedemann, 1822)
- Odontomyia limbata var. cephalonica Strobl, 1898
- Odontomyia limbifacies Bigot, 1859
- Odontomyia lineata Meijere, 1913
- Odontomyia longicornis Lindner, 1966
- Odontomyia lutatius Walker, 1849
- Odontomyia luteiceps Meijere, 1911
- Odontomyia maculata Meijere, 1907
- Odontomyia magnificus Lachaise & Lindner, 1973
- Odontomyia marginella Macquart, 1850
- Odontomyia masaica (Lindner, 1953)
- Odontomyia megacephala Olivier, 1811
- Odontomyia microcera (Séguy, 1930)
- Odontomyia microleon (Linnaeus, 1758)
- Odontomyia microstoma Loew, 1866
- Odontomyia mutica Wulp, 1885
- Odontomyia neodorsalis Miller, 1950
- Odontomyia nexura (Walker, 1858)
- Odontomyia nigerrima Loew, 1872
- Odontomyia nigrinervis Bezzi, 1926
- Odontomyia nitidiceps Wulp, 1888
- Odontomyia nitidissima (James, 1950)
- Odontomyia notatifrons Brunetti, 1923
- Odontomyia novaecaledoniae (Lindner, 1937)
- Odontomyia novaeguineensis (Lindner, 1957)
- Odontomyia nyassica (Lindner, 1943)
- Odontomyia obscuripes Thomson, 1869
- Odontomyia ochropa Thomson, 1869
- Odontomyia okinawae Nagatomi, 1977
- Odontomyia opertanea White, 1916
- Odontomyia ophrydifera (Lindner, 1935)
- Odontomyia ornata (Meigen, 1822)
- Odontomyia pachycephala Schiner, 1868
- Odontomyia pachyceps Bigot, 1879
- Odontomyia painteri James, 1936
- Odontomyia pallida Hill, 1919
- Odontomyia parallela (Walker, 1865)
- Odontomyia parallelina Bezzi, 1928
- Odontomyia pauliani James, 1975
- Odontomyia pectoralis Thomson, 1869
- Odontomyia periscelis Loew, 1873
- Odontomyia peruviana Macquart, 1855
- Odontomyia picea Walker, 1851
- Odontomyia picta (Pleske, 1922)
- Odontomyia pictifrons Loew, 1854
- Odontomyia pilimanus Loew, 1866
- Odontomyia pilosus Day, 1882
- Odontomyia plebeja Loew, 1872
- Odontomyia poecilopoda Bezzi, 1906
- Odontomyia polycedes (Speiser, 1910)
- Odontomyia proba (Lindner, 1957)
- Odontomyia profuscata Steyskal, 1938
- Odontomyia pubescens Day, 1882
- Odontomyia pulcherrima Brunetti, 1920
- Odontomyia quadrata (Lindner, 1937)
- Odontomyia quadrinotata Loew, 1857
- Odontomyia rectifasciata Macquart, 1838
- Odontomyia regisgeorgii Macquart, 1838
- Odontomyia restricta (Walker, 1864)
- Odontomyia rhodaspis James, 1980
- Odontomyia rufifacies Macquart, 1850
- Odontomyia rufipes Loew, 1866
- Odontomyia rufiventris (Lindner, 1966)
- Odontomyia rufocera Woodley, 2001
- Odontomyia rufoscutellata Brunetti, 1926
- Odontomyia saphyrina Lindner, 1968
- Odontomyia schoutedeni (Lindner, 1938)
- Odontomyia scutellata Macquart, 1846
- Odontomyia seyrigi Lindner, 1968
- Odontomyia shikokuana (Nagatomi, 1977)
- Odontomyia siderogaster (Wiedemann, 1824)
- Odontomyia sidneyensis Schiner, 1868
- Odontomyia simplex (Bigot, 1887)
- Odontomyia sinica Yang, 1995
- Odontomyia smaragdifera (Lindner, 1938)
- Odontomyia solennis Walker, 1851
- Odontomyia stigmaticalis Thomson, 1869
- Odontomyia stricta Erichson, 1842
- Odontomyia stylata Macquart, 1847
- Odontomyia subdentata Macquart, 1850
- Odontomyia subobscura (James, 1948)
- Odontomyia subpicta (James, 1957)
- Odontomyia thula Woodley, 2001
- Odontomyia tigrina (Fabricius, 1775)
- Odontomyia timorensis (Lindner, 1951)
- Odontomyia toxopeusi (Lindner, 1957)
- Odontomyia transversa Brunetti, 1920
- Odontomyia triangulifera Becker, 1913
- Odontomyia tumida Banks, 1926
- Odontomyia uninigra Yang, 1995
- Odontomyia vanderwulpiana Brèthes, 1907
- Odontomyia vicina Macquart, 1838
- Odontomyia virgo (Wiedemann, 1830)
- Odontomyia viridana (Wiedemann, 1824)
- Odontomyia vittata Macquart, 1850
- Odontomyia xanthopus Bezzi, 1906
- Odontomyia yangi Yang, 1995
