= Riccoboni =

Riccoboni is a surname, and may refer to:

- Adrienne Riccoboni, married name Adrienne Corri (1930–2016), British actress
- Bartolomea Riccoboni (c.1369–1440), Venetian Dominican nun
- Antoine-François Riccoboni (1707–1772), Italian actor
- Luigi Riccoboni (1676–1753), Italian actor and writer on theatre
- Marie Jeanne Riccoboni (1713–1792), French actress and novelist
- R.D. Riccoboni (b. 1960), gay American painter
