= Lelio =

Lelio or Lélio may refer to:

== People ==
- Lelio (given name), a given name
- Lélio (actor) (1676–1753), Italian actor and writer on theatre
- Sebastián Lelio (born 1974), Chilean film director and screenwriter

== Others ==
- Lélio, or the Return to Life, a 1831 work incorporating music and spoken text by the French composer Hector Berlioz
- Lélio (Commedia dell'arte), a stock character of the commedia dell'arte

== See also ==
- Lello (disambiguation)
