= Lelio (given name) =

- Gender: Male

Lelio is a male given name.

- Lelio Antoniotti (1928 –2014), Italian football player
- Lelio Basso (1903 – 1978), Italian democratic socialist politician, political scientist and journalist
- Lelio Biscia, (1575 – 1638), Italian Catholic cardinal
- Lelio Bisciola (1539 – ?), Italian historian of music
- Lelio Bonaccorso (born 1982), Italian comic artist and illustrator
- Lelio Brancaccio (around 1560–1637), Neapolitan commander of Habsburg armies in Italy, the Low Countries and Catalonia
- Lelio Brancaccio (bishop) (? – 1599), Italian Catholic archbishop
- Lelio Cantoni (1802 – 1857) was an Italian rabbi
- Lelio Colaneri (1917 – 1994), Italian professional football player
- Lelio Colista (1629 – 1680), Italian Baroque composer, lutenist, and guitarist
- Lelio Dalla Volpe (1685 – 1749), Bolognese Italian publisher of the 18th century
- Lelio Della Torre (1805 – 1871), Italian Jewish scholar and poet writing in Italian, German, French and Hebrew
- Lelio Falconieri (1585 – 1648), Italian Catholic Cardinal
- Lélio fils, stage name of Antoine-François Riccoboni (1707 – 1772), Italian actor
- Lelio Lagorio (1925 – 2017), Italian politician
- Lelio Landi (died 1610), Italian Roman Catholic prelate who served as Bishop of Nardò
- Lelio Luttazzi (1923 – 2010), Italian composer, musician, actor, singer, conductor, writer, and television and radio presenter
- Lelio Marino (c. 1935 – 2004), American entrepreneur
- Lelio Orci (1937 – 2019), Italian scientist in the field of endocrinology and diabetes
- Lelio Orsi (1508/1511 – 1587), a Mannerist painter and architect
- Lélio Souza (1937 – 2026), Brazilian politician
- Lelio Sozzini (1525 – 1562), Italian Renaissance humanist and theologian
- Lelio Torelli (1489 – 1576), Italian civil servant and jurist
- Lelio Veterano (1580 – 1619), Roman Catholic prelate who served as Bishop of Fondi
- Lelio Vittorio Valobra (1900 – 1976), Jewish Italian lawyer and Jewish resistance
