= RD =

Rd is an abbreviation for road.

RD or Rd may also refer to:

== Arts, entertainment, and media ==
- Reader's Digest, a United States general-interest magazine
- Real Drive, an anime by Production I.G
- RD (group), a British girl group also known as Ruff Diamondz
- Rilindja Demokratike, an Albanian newspaper
- Razor Dolls, an online blogging group based on SpaceHey and Instagram
- Rainbow Dash, one of the six main characters of My Little Pony: Friendship Is Magic

== People ==
- R. D. Blackmore, English novelist
- R. D. Burman, Indian musician
- R. D. Laing, British psychiatrist
- R. D. Matthews, Texan organized crime figure
- R.D. Riccoboni, painter

== Businesses and organizations ==
- Pratt & Whitney Rocketdyne, a United States rocket engine company
- Ryan International Airlines (IATA airline designator RD)
- USDA Rural Development, an agency of the United States Department of Agriculture

== Language ==
- ‹rd›, a Latin alphabet digraph of a retroflex stop in Aboriginal Australian languages
- rd, an English-language ordinal indicator, for ordinal numbers ending in "third" (e.g. 3rd, 23rd, 33rd)

== Military ==
- Emblem for Reserve Force Service or Reserve Decoration, an award of the South African National Defense Force Military Reserve
- Repair Depot (e.g., 6 Repair Depot), in military use
- Reserve Decoration, an award for service in the Royal Navy Reserve of the United Kingdom

== Positions and titles ==
- Resident director, a common staff position at universities and colleges with on-campus housing
- Rural dean, an ecclesiastical title in Anglicanism
- Reverendo Don, the Italian written form of address for Catholic priests, equivalent to the English “Reverend Father”

== Science, technology, and mathematics ==
=== Computing ===
- Rata Die, a calendar-independent system to assign numbers to calendar dates
- Rate–distortion optimization, a decision algorithm used in video compression
- Rider (software), a cross-platform IDE intended for C# and .NET development
- rmdir, a shell command meaning "remove directory"
- Route distinguisher, in data networking, a concept in Multiprotocol Label Switching
- Ruby Document format, a markup language used for documentation of Ruby programs

=== Health and medicine ===
- Restrictive dermopathy
- Reading disability, a condition resulting primarily from neurological factors
- Registered Dietitian, an expert in dietetics
- Retinal detachment, a disorder of the eye
- Risk difference, a term in epidemiology related to absolute risk reduction

=== Other uses in science, technology, and mathematics ===
- R^{d}, the mathematical domain of real numbers
- Reaktivniy Dvigatel, a Soviet Russian prefix for an engine design series (literally, "reactive engine"; see RD-8 for example)
- Research and development
- Rutherford (unit), a unit of radioactivity

== Transportation ==
- Red Line (Washington Metro)
- Richmond and Danville Railroad

== Other uses ==
- Dominican Republic, a Caribbean country
  - Dominican peso (currency symbol: RD$)
- rd, a round or cartridge of ammunition
- Recurring deposit
- Regional district
- Rural delivery service, mail delivery in what are traditionally considered rural areas in the United States

== See also ==
- Remote desktop (disambiguation)
