= Lélio (Commedia dell'arte) =

Italian stock character

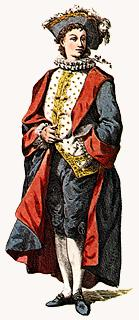
Lélio. (Maurice Sand, Masques et bouffons (comédie italienne), 1860.)

Lélio is a stock character of the commedia dell'arte.

Lélio represents the happy innamorati, loved by the woman he loves (often Isabella), always friendly and cheerful, with a hint of comic.

Several actors played the role in Paris, particularly Luigi Riccoboni who gained great successes with the part due to his talent, grace, elegance and happy countenance, as well as his son Antoine-François Riccoboni, called "Lélio fils".

Molière introduced the figure of Lélio in two of his comedies, l'Étourdi and The Imaginary Cuckold. Marivaux used it in his Surprise de l'amour and his Prince travesti.

Being of aristocratic rank, his outfit is highly sought as a court dress.

== See also ==
- Pantalone
- Vecchio

== Sources ==
- Arthur Pougin, Dictionnaire historique et pittoresque du théâtre et des arts qui s’y rattachent, Paris, Firmin-Didot, 1885, (p.468-9).
