= Eularia =

Eularia may refer to:

- the name of a female character in 16th-century Italian theatre, collectively called Innamorati.
- Santa Eulària des Riu, the Catalan name of a coastal town on the south eastern seaboard of the Spanish island of Eivissa.
- Synonym of the fly genus Odontomyia
