= Black Colonel =

Black Colonel may refer to one of the following:

== People ==
- Viktor Alksnis (b. 1950), Russian politician
- John Farquharson, 3rd of Inverey
- Fatulla Huseynov (1937-2004), first vice-president of the Azerbaijan Football Federations Association (AFFA)
- Maharaja Nandakumar (1705-1775), West Bengal collector of taxes
- Joseph Bologne, Chevalier de Saint-Georges (1745-1799), the first black colonel in the French army
- Charles Young (United States Army) (1864-1922), the first black colonel in the U.S. army

== Other uses ==
- A Soviet political derogatory term for the Greek military junta of 1967–74
- Odontomyia tigrina, the black colonel, a British soldierfly
