= Odontomyia confusa =

Scientific classification
- Kingdom: Animalia
- Phylum: Arthropoda
- Class: Insecta
- Order: Diptera
- Family: Stratiomyidae
- Subfamily: Stratiomyinae
- Tribe: Stratiomyini
- Genus: Odontomyia
- Species: O. confusa

Binomial name
- Odontomyia confusa (Rossi, 1794)

Synonyms
- Stratiomyx confusa Rossi, 1794

Species of fly

Odontomyia confusa is a species of soldier fly in the family Stratiomyidae.

== Distribution ==
Italy.
