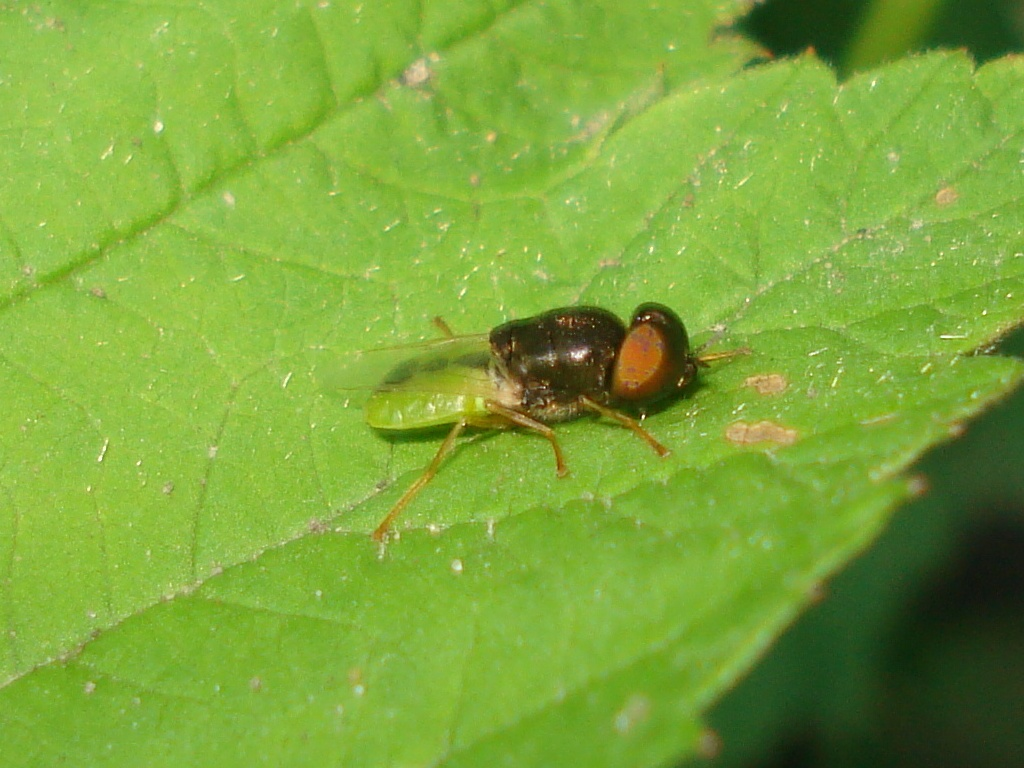

Scientific classification
- Kingdom: Animalia
- Phylum: Arthropoda
- Clade: Pancrustacea
- Class: Insecta
- Order: Diptera
- Family: Stratiomyidae
- Subfamily: Stratiomyinae
- Tribe: Stratiomyini
- Genus: Odontomyia
- Species: O. angulata

Binomial name
- Odontomyia angulata (Panzer, 1798)

Synonyms
- Stratiomys angulata Panzer, 1798; Stratiomys vulpina Panzer, 1798; Stratiomys hydropota Meigen, 1822; Stratiomys triangulata Stephens, 1829; Odontomyia latifasciata Macquart, 1834; Odontomyia latifaciata Macquart, 1834; Odontomyia latifasciata Macquart, 1834; Stratiomys brevicornis Loew, 1840; Stratiomys ruficornis Zetterstedt, 1842; Odontomyia hydrophila Loew, 1846; Odontomyia vutpina Schiner, 1855; Odontomyia hdgropota Schiner, 1855; Odontomyia latifasciata Kertész, 1908

= Odontomyia angulata =

Species of fly

Odontomyia angulata, also called the orange-horned green colonel, is a European species of soldier fly.Diagnostic characters are:-Distinctly smaller species, body not more than 10 mm. long. Discal cell not conspicuously small; vein R2+3 present. Discal cell emits 3 veins (M3 present) Frons narrower than in Odontomyia hydroleon , rather swollen, predominantly yellow-brown with reddish-brown pattern. In both sexes, face less prominent between eyes, and in dorsal view less snout-like than in hydroleon. Lateral spots of abdomen filling length of each segment, so that black areas do not reach lateral margins.

== Distribution ==
Afghanistan, Albania, Algeria, Austria, Bangladesh, Belgium, Bulgaria, China, Czech Republic, Denmark, Egypt, England, Estonia, Finland, France, Germany, Greece, Hungary, Iran, Israel, Italy, Kazakhstan, Morocco, Netherlands, Poland, Romania, Russia.
