= Odontomyia bifascia =

Scientific classification
- Kingdom: Animalia
- Phylum: Arthropoda
- Class: Insecta
- Order: Diptera
- Family: Stratiomyidae
- Subfamily: Stratiomyinae
- Tribe: Stratiomyini
- Genus: Odontomyia
- Species: O. bifascia

Binomial name
- Odontomyia bifascia (Walker, 1861)

Synonyms
- Stratiomys bifascia Walker, 1861

Species of fly

Odontomyia bifascia is a species of soldier fly in the family Stratiomyidae.

== Distribution ==
Irian Jaya.
