= Odontomyia ialemus =

Scientific classification
- Kingdom: Animalia
- Phylum: Arthropoda
- Clade: Pancrustacea
- Class: Insecta
- Order: Diptera
- Family: Stratiomyidae
- Subfamily: Stratiomyinae
- Tribe: Stratiomyini
- Genus: Odontomyia
- Species: O. ialemus

Binomial name
- Odontomyia ialemus Walker, 1849

Synonyms
- Odontomyia jalemus Kertész, 1908; Odontomyia ialmenus Hardy, 1918

Species of fly

Odontomyia ialemus is a species of soldier fly in the family Stratiomyidae.

== Distribution ==
Australia.
