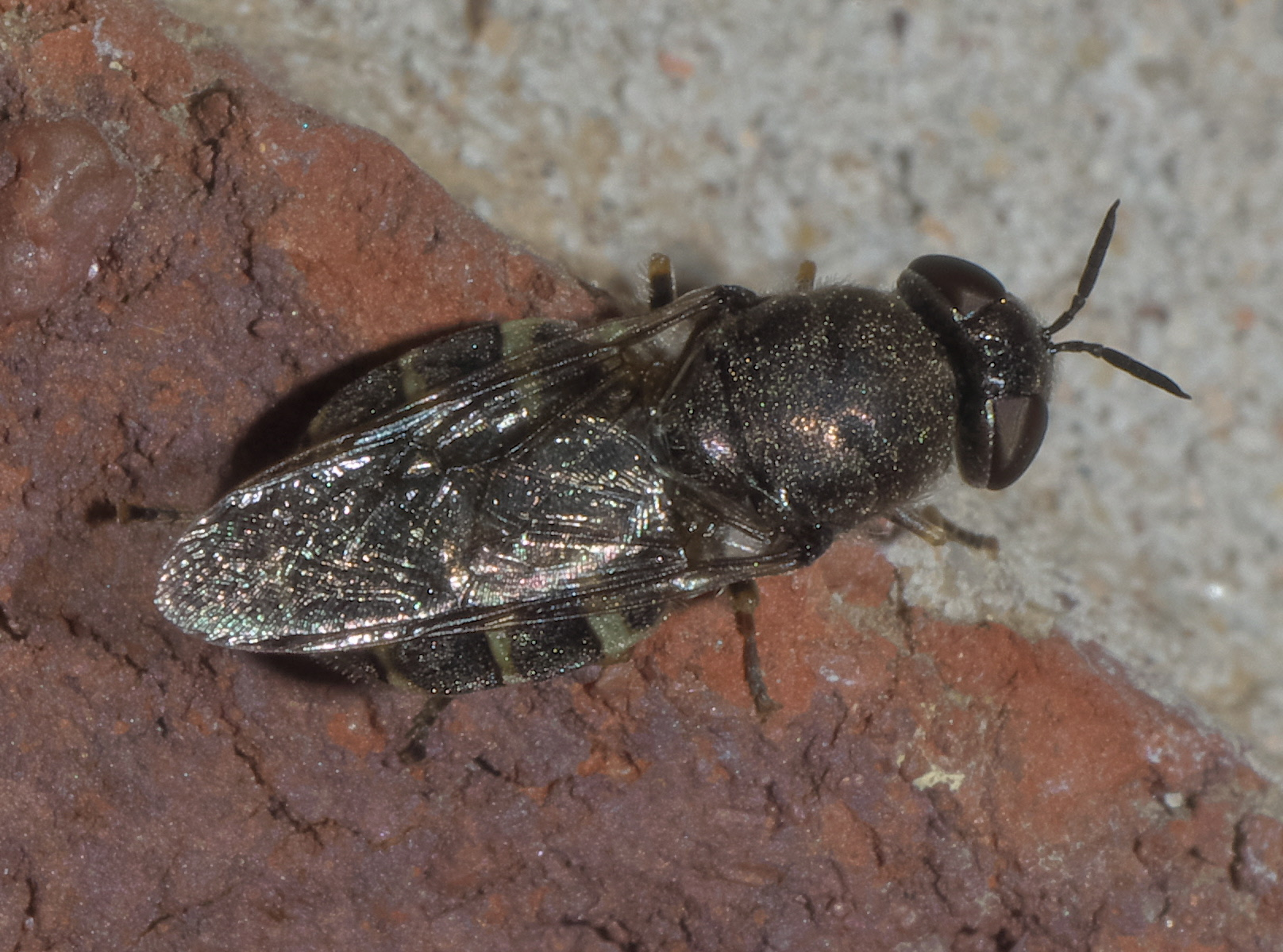

Scientific classification
- Kingdom: Animalia
- Phylum: Arthropoda
- Class: Insecta
- Order: Diptera
- Family: Stratiomyidae
- Subfamily: Stratiomyinae
- Tribe: Stratiomyini
- Genus: Odontomyia
- Species: O. interrupta

Binomial name
- Odontomyia interrupta Olivier, 1811

Synonyms
- Stratiomys intermedia Wiedemann, 1830; Odontomyia crassirostris Johnson, 1895

= Odontomyia interrupta =

Species of fly

Odontomyia interrupta is a species of soldier fly in the family Stratiomyidae.

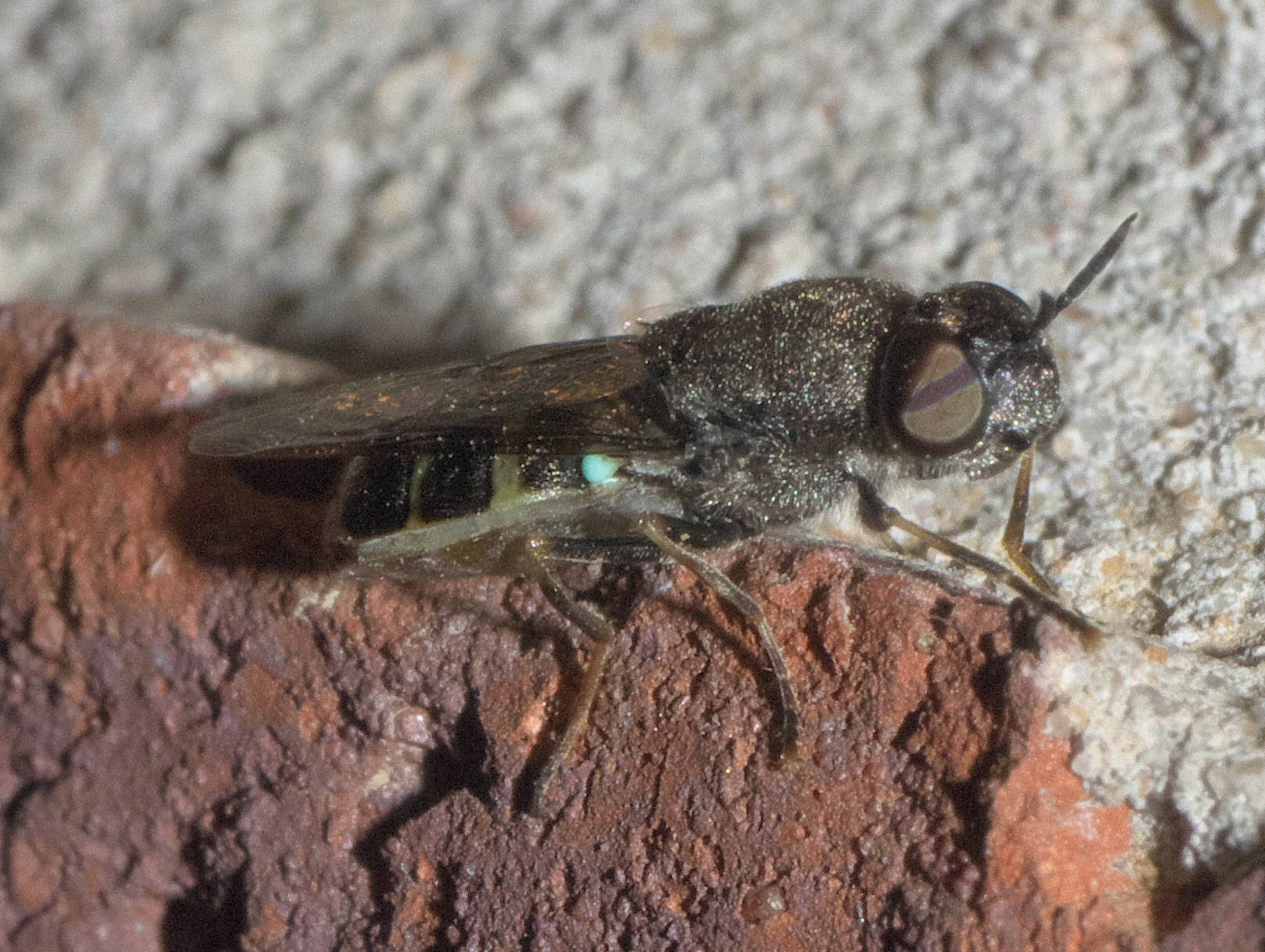

== Distribution ==
Canada, United States.
