= Odontomyia amyris =

Scientific classification
- Kingdom: Animalia
- Phylum: Arthropoda
- Clade: Pancrustacea
- Class: Insecta
- Order: Diptera
- Family: Stratiomyidae
- Subfamily: Stratiomyinae
- Tribe: Stratiomyini
- Genus: Odontomyia
- Species: O. amyris

Binomial name
- Odontomyia amyris (Walker, 1849)

Synonyms
- Stratiomys amyris Walker, 1849

Species of fly

Odontomyia amyris is a species of soldier fly in the family Stratiomyidae.

== Distribution ==
Australia.
