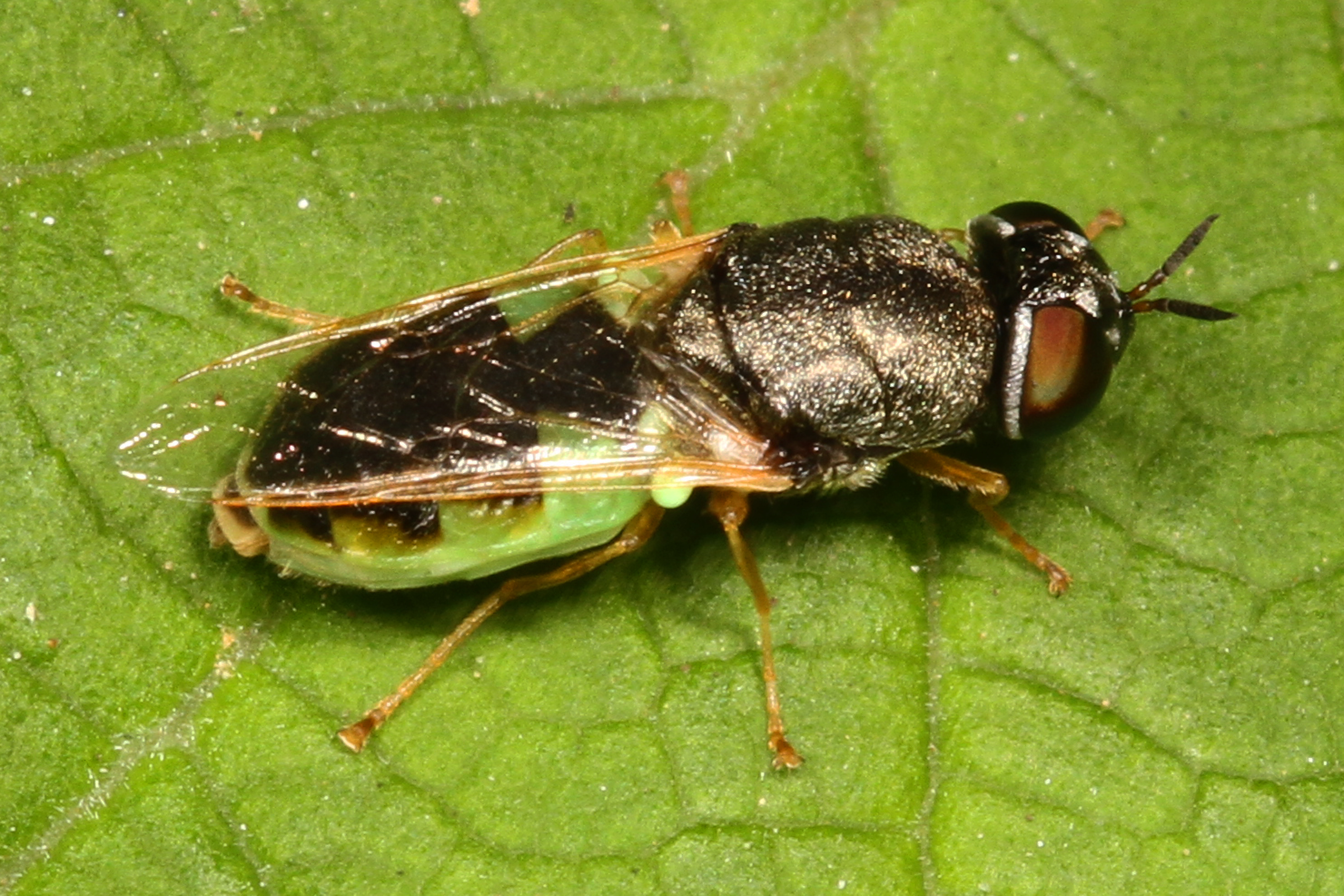

Scientific classification
- Kingdom: Animalia
- Phylum: Arthropoda
- Class: Insecta
- Order: Diptera
- Family: Stratiomyidae
- Subfamily: Stratiomyinae
- Tribe: Stratiomyini
- Genus: Odontomyia
- Species: O. virgo

Binomial name
- Odontomyia virgo (Wiedemann, 1830)

Synonyms
- Stratiomys virgo Wiedemann, 1830; Odontomyia paron Walker, 1849; Odontomyia nigra Day, 1882

= Odontomyia virgo =

Species of fly

Odontomyia virgo is a species of soldier fly in the family Stratiomyidae.

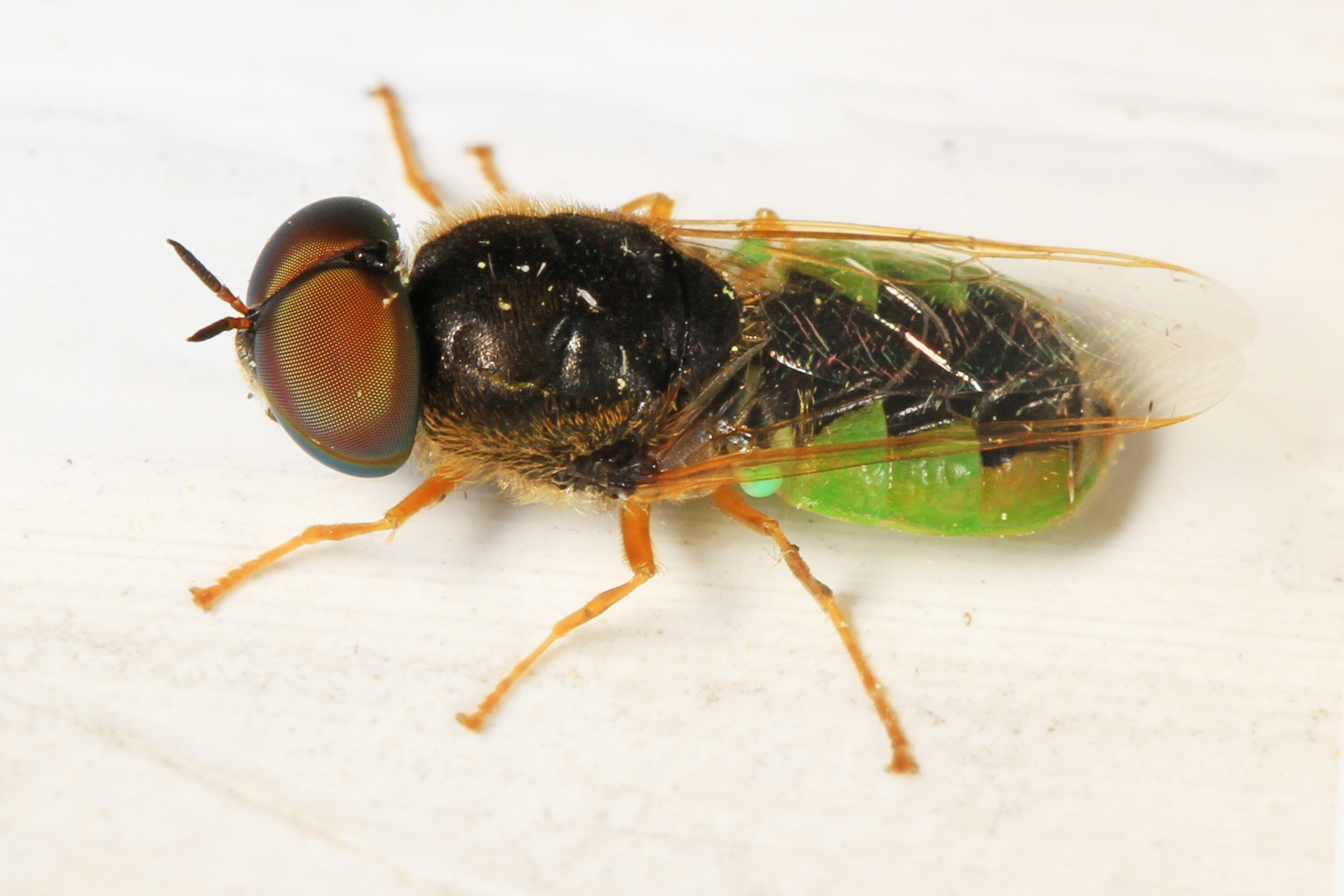

== Distribution ==
Canada, United States.
