= Odontomyia finalis =

Scientific classification
- Kingdom: Animalia
- Phylum: Arthropoda
- Class: Insecta
- Order: Diptera
- Family: Stratiomyidae
- Subfamily: Stratiomyinae
- Tribe: Stratiomyini
- Genus: Odontomyia
- Species: O. finalis

Binomial name
- Odontomyia finalis (Walker, 1859)

Synonyms
- Stratiomys finalis Walker, 1859

Species of fly

Odontomyia finalis is a species of soldier fly in the family Stratiomyidae.

== Distribution ==
Myanmar, Indonesia.
