= Odontomyia argentata =

Scientific classification
- Kingdom: Animalia
- Phylum: Arthropoda
- Clade: Pancrustacea
- Class: Insecta
- Order: Diptera
- Family: Stratiomyidae
- Subfamily: Stratiomyinae
- Tribe: Stratiomyini
- Genus: Odontomyia
- Species: O. argentata

Binomial name
- Odontomyia argentata (Fabricius, 1794)

Synonyms
- Stratiomys argentata Fabricius, 1794; Stratiomys anilis Schrank, 1803; Stratiomys paludosa Schummel, 1837; Stratiomys argentula Gimmerthal, 1847; Odontomyia atrata Verrall, 1909; Catatasina argentata var. nigrifemurEnderlein, 1937

Species of fly

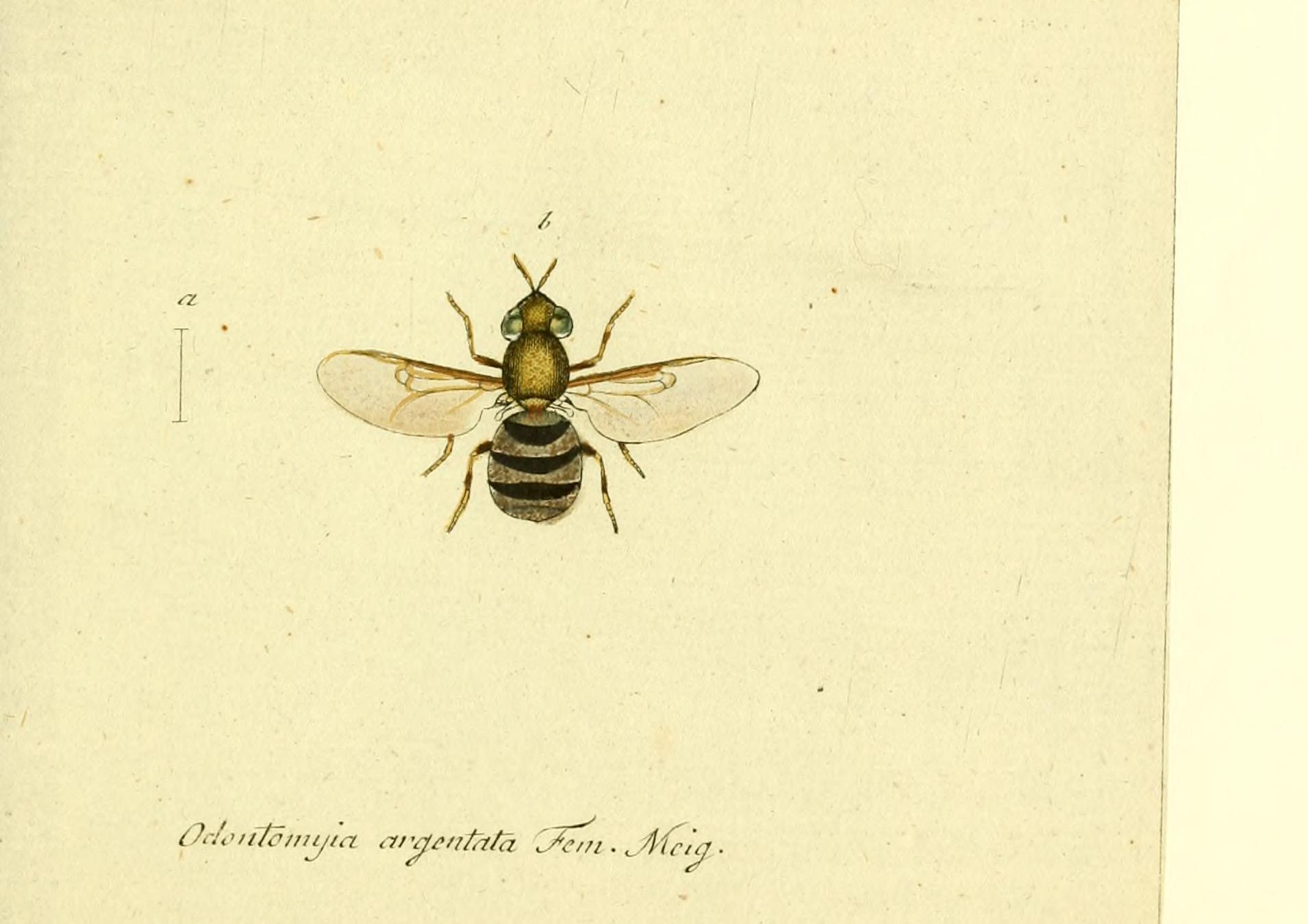

Odontomyia argentata, also called the silver colonel, is a European species of soldier fly.The following characters are diagnostic.Discal cell not conspicuously small; vein R2+3 present;discal cell emits only 2 veins (M3 absent); R4+6 not forked. Abdomen dorsally with three pairs of small, but distinct, lateral yellow spots, hoary pile especially obvious in males; females with pile sparser and more bronze. Head in both sexes broader, more transverse; eyes of male only microscopically hairy

== Distrution ==
Central and East Europe, Russia, China, Mongolia.
