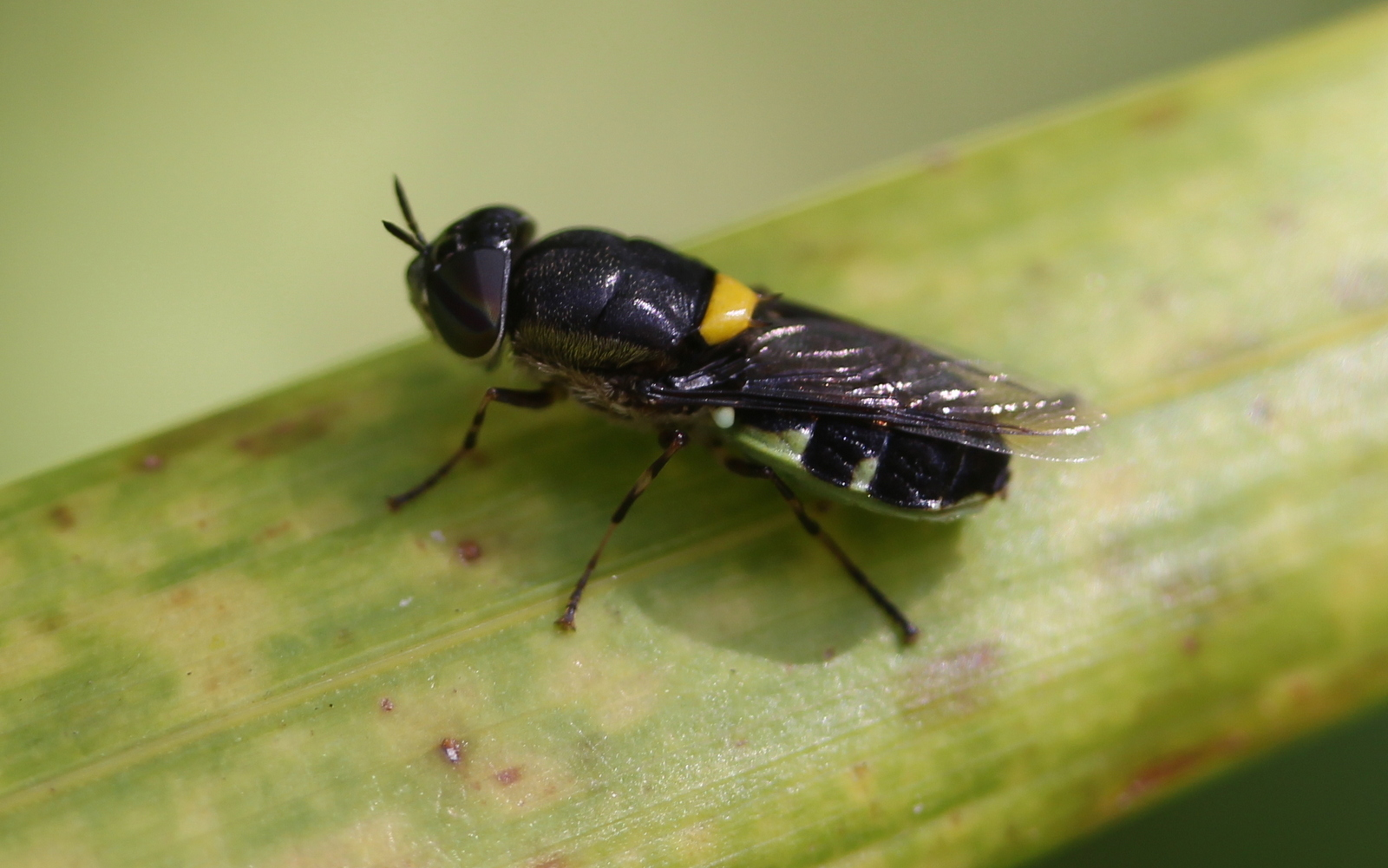

Scientific classification
- Kingdom: Animalia
- Phylum: Arthropoda
- Clade: Pancrustacea
- Class: Insecta
- Order: Diptera
- Family: Stratiomyidae
- Subfamily: Stratiomyinae
- Tribe: Stratiomyini
- Genus: Odontomyia
- Species: O. hunteri

Binomial name
- Odontomyia hunteri (Macleay, 1826)

Synonyms
- Stratiomys hunteri Macleay, 1826

= Odontomyia hunteri =

Species of fly

Odontomyia hunteri is an Australian species of soldier fly in the family Stratiomyidae. The original insect was collected by Captain King. The species was named in honour of the Mermaid's surgeon James Hunter in 1826, by Alexander Macleay.

== Distribution ==
Australia
