= Odontomyia hirtocculata =

Scientific classification
- Kingdom: Animalia
- Phylum: Arthropoda
- Class: Insecta
- Order: Diptera
- Family: Stratiomyidae
- Subfamily: Stratiomyinae
- Tribe: Stratiomyini
- Genus: Odontomyia
- Species: O. hirtocculata

Binomial name
- Odontomyia hirtocculata James, 1936

Synonyms
- Odontomyia pacifica Curran, 1927

Species of fly

Odontomyia hirtocculata is a species of soldier fly in the family Stratiomyidae.

== Distribution ==
United States.
