= Odontomyia lutatius =

Scientific classification
- Kingdom: Animalia
- Phylum: Arthropoda
- Class: Insecta
- Order: Diptera
- Family: Stratiomyidae
- Subfamily: Stratiomyinae
- Tribe: Stratiomyini
- Genus: Odontomyia
- Species: O. lutatius

Binomial name
- Odontomyia lutatius (Walker, 1849)

Synonyms
- Stratiomys diffusa Walker, 1854

Species of fly

Odontomyia lutatius is a species of soldier fly in the family Stratiomyidae.

== Distribution ==
India, Java, Taiwan.
