= Odontomyia pubescens =

Scientific classification
- Kingdom: Animalia
- Phylum: Arthropoda
- Class: Insecta
- Order: Diptera
- Family: Stratiomyidae
- Subfamily: Stratiomyinae
- Tribe: Stratiomyini
- Genus: Odontomyia
- Species: O. pubescens

Binomial name
- Odontomyia pubescens Day, 1882

Synonyms
- Odontomyia latipes Johnson, 1895

Species of fly

Odontomyia pubescens is a species of soldier fly in the family Stratiomyidae.

== Distribution ==
Canada, United States.
