= Elena Balletti =

Italian actress and writer (1686–1771)

- Born: 27 April 1686; Ferrara
- Died: 29 December 1771 (aged 85); Paris
- Other names: Flamina; Elena Riccoboni
- Occupations: Actress, writer
- Spouse: Luigi Riccoboni
- Children: Antoine-François Riccoboni

Elena Balletti, Elena Riccoboni or Flaminia (27 April 1686 – 29 December 1771) was an Italian actress, poet, woman of letters, playwright and writer.

== Personal life ==
Elena Virginia Balletti was born in Ferrara to a family of actors. Her parents were Francesco and Giovanna Benozzi, with the Francesco Calderoni company. She inherited the stage name Flaminia from her grandmother Agata Calderoni, as the name was passed down through the family. She was the second wife of the director of her theatre company, fellow actor Luigi Andrea Riccoboni. They were married in 1706. Their son was actor Antoine-François Riccoboni. Her brother Giuseppe Balletti remained in the company and travelled to France with her.

== Career ==
She learned Latin, Greek, Spanish and French and was considered culturally well educated. She was admitted to the Pontifical Academy of Arcadia as a poet. She wrote under the name Mirtinda Parraside. Balletti was also a member of the academies of Ferrara, Bologna and Venice. In Paris, Bellotti was known for her 'salons' and wrote with numerous writers such as Antonio Conti.

Balletti and Riccoboni took their Italian theater company to France where she was the first to play Merope by Francesco Scipione, marchese di Maffei. Balletti was a renowned actress in Paris known by her character name of Flaminia. She gained recognition as a leading actress in Sofonisba by Giovan Giorgio Trissino, Semiramide by Muzio Manfredi and Iphigénie en Tauride by Pier Jacopo Martello.

Balletti retired with her husband in 1729 however she returned to the stage on 10 April 1731 and stayed working until 1752. Balletti died in Paris in 1771.

== Bibliography ==
- Sonnets by Mirtinda Parasside
- Letters of Fanny Butler
- The Shipwreck, 1726
