= Odontomyia cinctilinea =

Scientific classification
- Kingdom: Animalia
- Phylum: Arthropoda
- Class: Insecta
- Order: Diptera
- Family: Stratiomyidae
- Subfamily: Stratiomyinae
- Tribe: Stratiomyini
- Genus: Odontomyia
- Species: O. cinctilinea

Binomial name
- Odontomyia cinctilinea (Walker, 1861)

Synonyms
- Stratiomys cinctilinea Walker, 1861

Species of fly

Odontomyia cinctilinea is a species of soldier fly in the family Stratiomyidae.

== Distribution ==
Maluku.
