= Odontomyia inaequalis =

Scientific classification
- Kingdom: Animalia
- Phylum: Arthropoda
- Class: Insecta
- Order: Diptera
- Family: Stratiomyidae
- Subfamily: Stratiomyinae
- Tribe: Stratiomyini
- Genus: Odontomyia
- Species: O. inaequalis

Binomial name
- Odontomyia inaequalis Loew, 1866

Synonyms
- Odontomyia inequalis Day, 1882; Odontomyia confusa James, 1936; Odontomyia communis James, 1939; Odontomyia inaequalis ssp. continua James, 1974; Odontomyia inaequalis ssp. continus Zack, 1984

Species of fly

Odontomyia inaequalis is a species of soldier fly in the family Stratiomyidae.

== Distribution ==
Canada, United States, Mexico.
