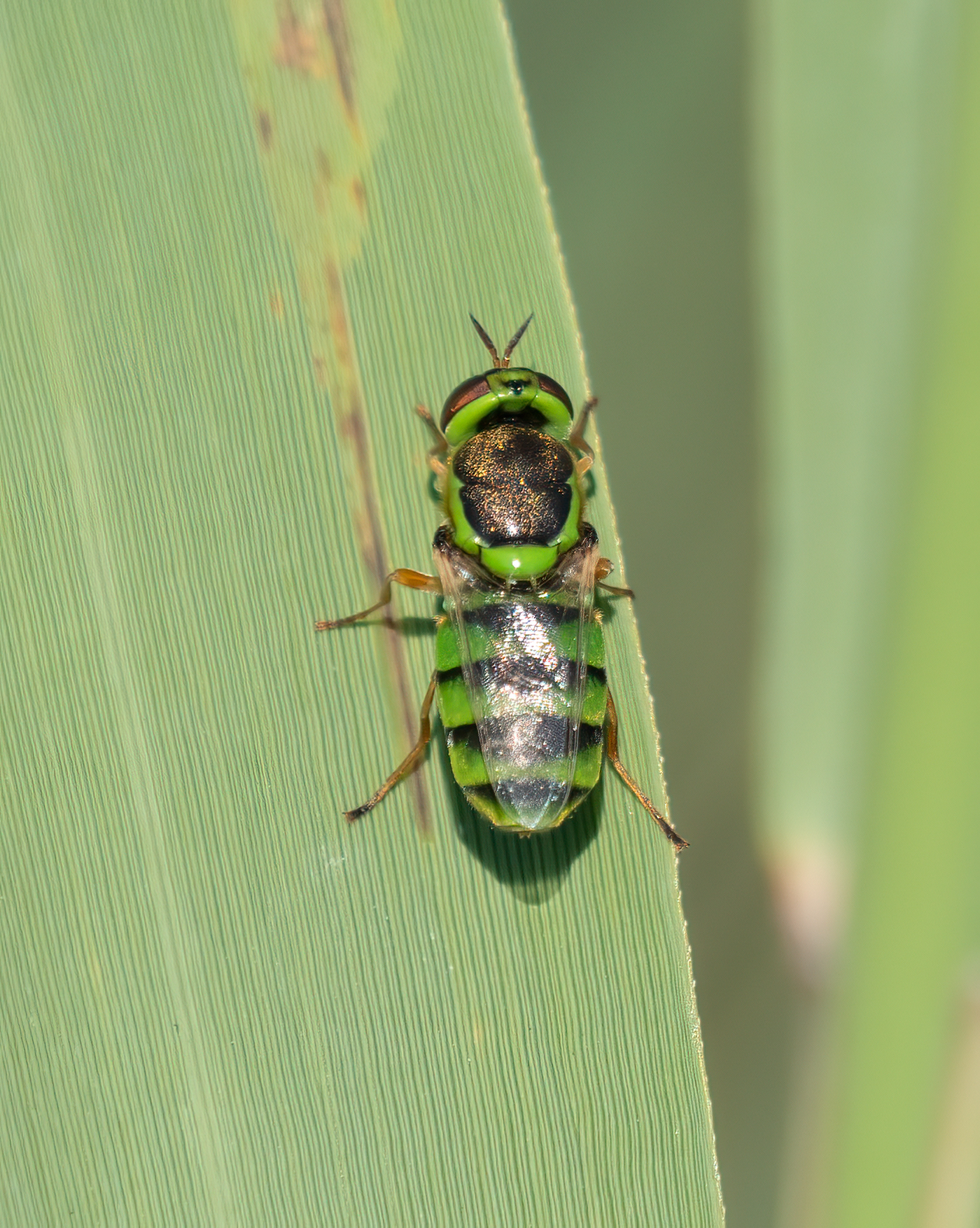

Scientific classification
- Kingdom: Animalia
- Phylum: Arthropoda
- Class: Insecta
- Order: Diptera
- Family: Stratiomyidae
- Subfamily: Stratiomyinae
- Tribe: Stratiomyini
- Genus: Odontomyia
- Species: O. cincta

Binomial name
- Odontomyia cincta Olivier, 1811

Synonyms
- Odontomyia brevifacies Macquart, 1855; Odontomyia extremis Day, 1882

= Odontomyia cincta =

Species of fly

Odontomyia cincta is a species of soldier fly in the family Stratiomyidae.

== Distribution ==
Canada, United States.
