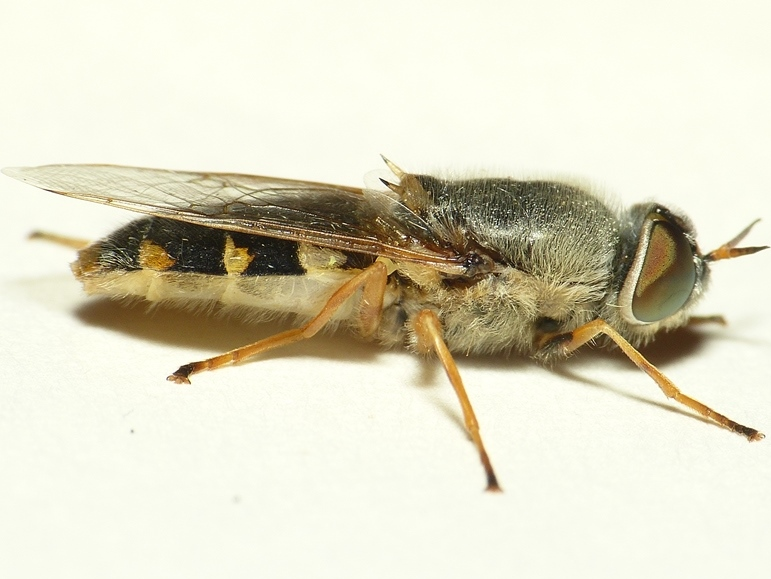

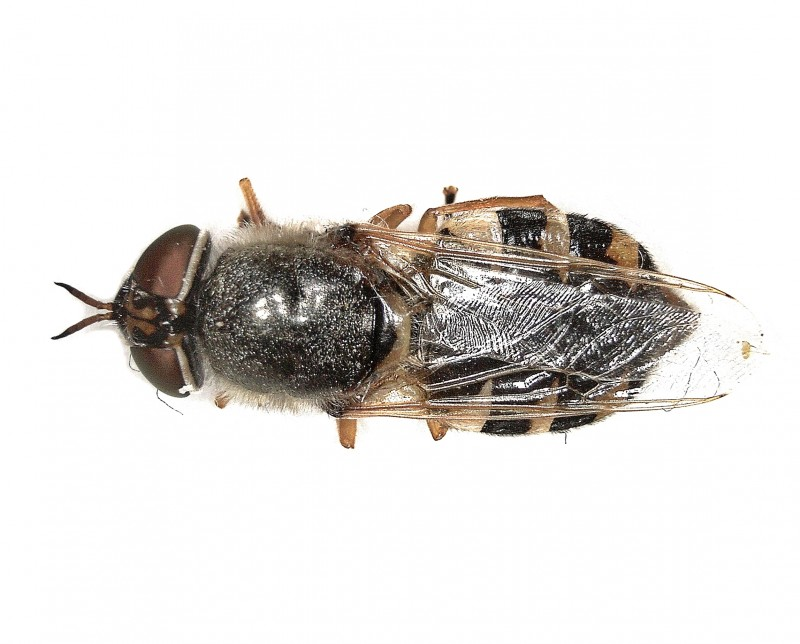

Scientific classification
- Kingdom: Animalia
- Phylum: Arthropoda
- Clade: Pancrustacea
- Class: Insecta
- Order: Diptera
- Family: Stratiomyidae
- Subfamily: Stratiomyinae
- Tribe: Stratiomyini
- Genus: Odontomyia
- Species: O. ornata

Binomial name
- Odontomyia ornata (Meigen, 1822)

Synonyms
- Stratiomys ornata Meigen, 1822; Odontomyia ornata Macquart, 1826; Odontomyia signaticornis Loew, 1846

= Odontomyia ornata =

Species of fly

Odontomyia ornata, also called the ornate brigadier, is a European species of soldier fly.

== Description ==
The body length is 12 to 14 mm. The first two segments of the antennae are dark brown-black, and the next three are brown with reddish spots on the underside. The face is slightly wedge-shaped and elongated forward, black with white hair. The thorax is shiny black, with reddish-white hair in males and yellow-white hair in females. The yellow scutellum has a black spot near the base and black tips on the spines. The transparent wings feature a forked radial vein r4+5. The halteres have brown legs and white knobs. The male's abdomen is yellow underneath and black on top with two rows of yellow side spots, with those on the second to fourth tergites being the same size. The female's abdomen is orange underneath with brown spots, and black on top with two rows of orange side spots, with those on the second to fourth tergites being the same size.

== Distribution ==
Austria, Belgium, Bulgaria, Czech Republic, Denmark, England, France, Germany, Hungary, Israel, Italy, Kazakhstan, Lithuania, Netherlands, Poland, Romania, Russia, Scotland, Slovakia, Spain, Sweden, Switzerland, Syria, Turkey, Yugoslavia.
