= Odontomyia hoodiana =

Scientific classification
- Kingdom: Animalia
- Phylum: Arthropoda
- Class: Insecta
- Order: Diptera
- Family: Stratiomyidae
- Subfamily: Stratiomyinae
- Tribe: Stratiomyini
- Genus: Odontomyia
- Species: O. hoodiana

Binomial name
- Odontomyia hoodiana Bigot, 1887

Species of fly

Odontomyia hoodiana is a species of soldier fly in the family Stratiomyidae.

== Distribution ==
Canada, United States, Mexico.
