= Odontomyia microleon =

Scientific classification
- Kingdom: Animalia
- Phylum: Arthropoda
- Class: Insecta
- Order: Diptera
- Family: Stratiomyidae
- Subfamily: Stratiomyinae
- Tribe: Stratiomyini
- Genus: Odontomyia
- Species: O. microleon

Binomial name
- Odontomyia microleon (Linnaeus, 1758)

Synonyms
- Musca microleon Linnaeus, 1758; Musca mycroleon Harris, 1778; Musca nigricans Gmelin, 1790; Stratiomis mirroleon Guerin, 1828; Odontomyia nigriceps Bigot, 1881; Stratiomys nigriceps Bigot, 1887; Eulalia microleon ssp. minor Pleske, 1922; Eulalia bicincta Szilády, 1942

Species of fly

Odontomyia microleon is a European species of soldier fly.

== Distribution ==
North and Central Europe, Russia, Mongolia, China, Slovakia, Ukraine, Latvia.
