= Odontomyia profuscata =

Scientific classification
- Kingdom: Animalia
- Phylum: Arthropoda
- Class: Insecta
- Order: Diptera
- Family: Stratiomyidae
- Subfamily: Stratiomyinae
- Tribe: Stratiomyini
- Genus: Odontomyia
- Species: O. profuscata

Binomial name
- Odontomyia profuscata Steyskal, 1938

Synonyms
- Odontomyia melantera James, 1939

Species of fly

Odontomyia profuscata is a species of soldier fly in the family Stratiomyidae.

== Distribution ==
Canada, United States.
