= Odontomyia garatas =

Scientific classification
- Kingdom: Animalia
- Phylum: Arthropoda
- Class: Insecta
- Order: Diptera
- Family: Stratiomyidae
- Subfamily: Stratiomyinae
- Tribe: Stratiomyini
- Genus: Odontomyia
- Species: O. garatas

Binomial name
- Odontomyia garatas (Walker, 1849)

Synonyms
- Odontomyia staurophora Schiner, 1868

Species of fly

Odontomyia garatas is a species of soldier fly in the family Stratiomyidae.

== Distribution ==
China, Japan, Korea.
