= Odontomyia tumida =

Scientific classification
- Kingdom: Animalia
- Phylum: Arthropoda
- Class: Insecta
- Order: Diptera
- Family: Stratiomyidae
- Subfamily: Stratiomyinae
- Tribe: Stratiomyini
- Genus: Odontomyia
- Species: O. tumida

Binomial name
- Odontomyia tumida Banks, 1926

Species of fly

Odontomyia tumida is a species of soldier fly in the family Stratiomyidae.

== Distribution ==
United States.
