= Lelio Dalla Volpe =

Lelio dalla Volpe (17 September 1685 – 6 October 1749) was a Bolognese Italian publisher of the 18th century. After the founder's death, his business was carried on by his son, Petronio dalla Volpe (16 November 1721 – 18 September 1794).
