= Remote desktop (disambiguation) =

Remote desktop is a software or operating system that allows remotely controlling or logging into a desktop via a network connection.

Remote desktop or Remote Desktop may also refer to:

- Apple Remote Desktop
- Desktop sharing
- Microsoft Remote Desktop, or Remote Desktop, a modern Remote Desktop Protocol client
- Remote Desktop (Windows Mobile app)
- Remote Desktop client for Windows, branded as Remote Desktop, a client for connecting to Azure Virtual Desktops
- Remote Desktop Connection, or Remote Desktop, a Microsoft Windows component for using the Remote Desktop Protocol
- Remote Desktop Services, or Remote Desktop, a Windows Server component

== See also ==
- Remote Desktop Protocol (RDP)
