= Innamorati =

Stock characters within the theatre style known as Commedia dell'arte

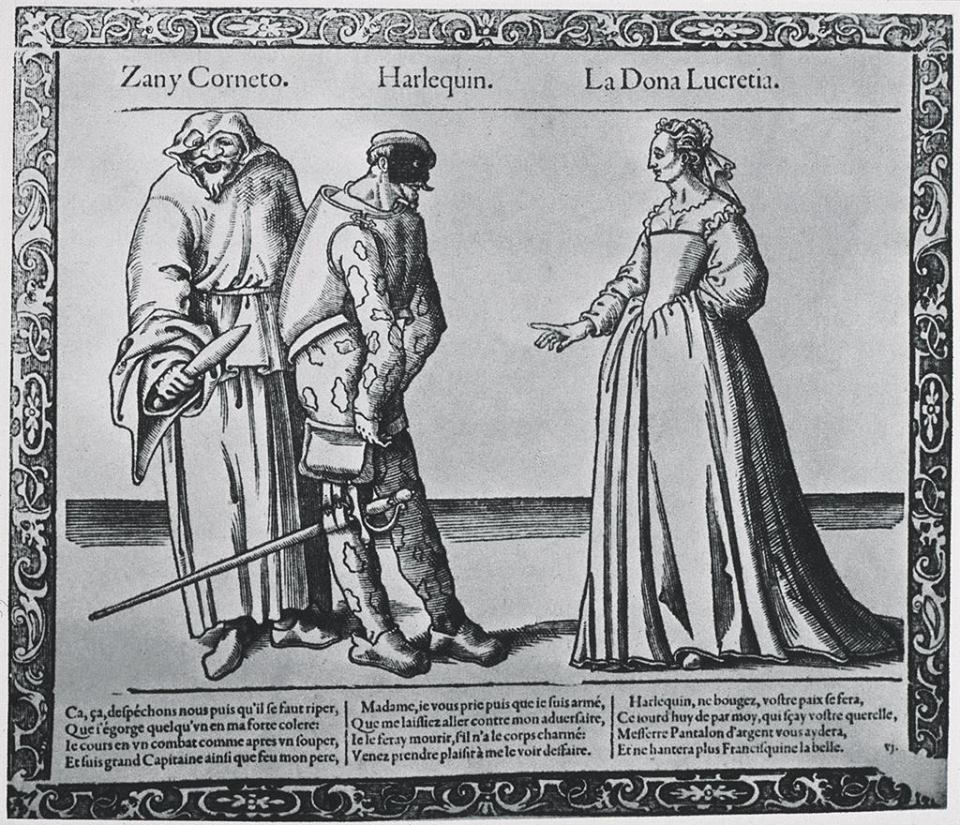
Two standard servants opposite a well-dressed, unmasked woman, La Dona Lucretia, who represents innamorata

Innamorati (Italian: [innamoˈraːti]; lit. 'lovers') were stock characters within the theatre style known as commedia dell'arte, who appeared in 16th-century Italy. In the plays, everything revolved around the lovers in some regard. These dramatic and posh characters were present within commedia plays for the sole purpose of being in love with one another, and moreover, with themselves. These characters move elegantly and smoothly, and their young faces are unmasked unlike other commedia dell'arte characters. Despite facing many obstacles, the lovers were always united by the end.

== Origins ==
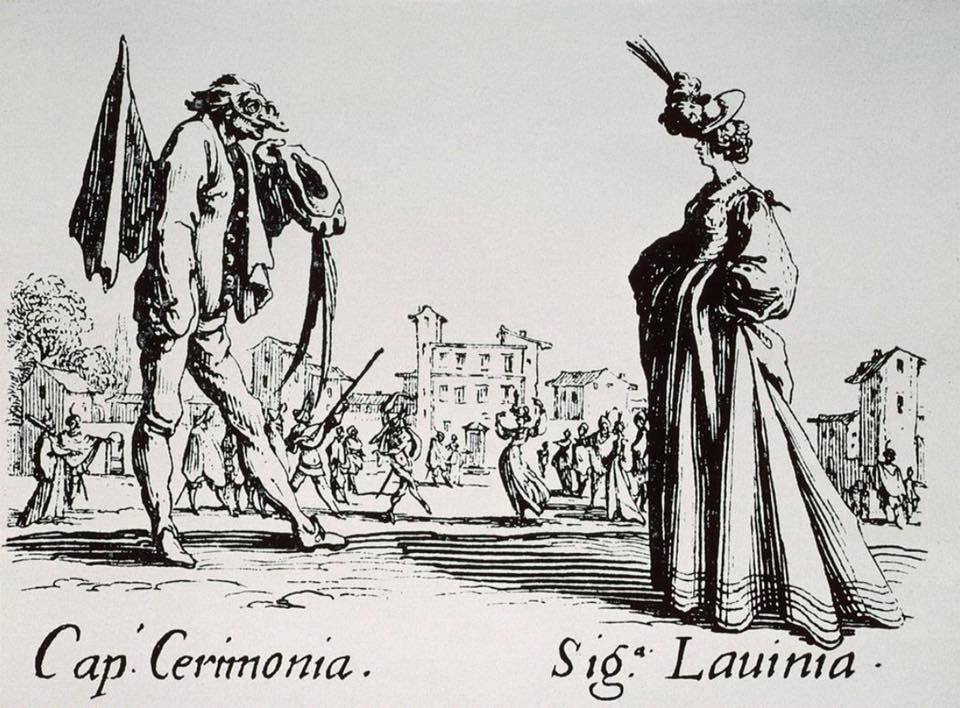
Character named "Captain Cerimonia" bows to unmasked woman named "Lavinia" who may be an example of innamorata or a female character.

The name innamorati is the Italian word for 'lovers'. The dramatists of the Italian Renaissance borrowed ideas from early Roman playwrights, such as Plautus and Terence, whom the theater style known as commedia erudita was inspired by. The lovers are the first actor, first actress, second actor, and second actress.

== Characteristics and dramatic function ==
The comedy of the lovers is that they are ridiculous and over the top about everything, but they are completely sincere in their emotions. The main function of the lovers within the play is to be in love; and in doing so, they come upon obstacles that keep them from pursuing their relationship. These obstacles stemmed from varied causes. For instance, the financial or personal interests of a lover's parent may have prevented the lovers' relationship from progressing. The pair always involves other commedia characters, such as Zanni characters, to try to figure out how they can be together. This is necessary, because due to their conceited stupidity, and lack of experience with all of the mysteries of love, and the sensations and emotions that come with it, they cannot figure it out on their own.

The lovers tend to be overly dramatic in expressing their emotions. Separation from their lover leads them to strongly lament their state and yet, once they finally meet, they are at a loss for words. Thus, they usually require the aid of a servant to communicate with their partner. The lovers are often childlike and immature, especially if they do not get their way. They can be oblivious and self-centered, and are in love with the very idea of love and what it pertains to.

== Physical appearance and attributes ==
The lovers are depicted as being young in age. Their behavior in the plays should show courteousness and gallantry. They are portrayed as having received an education, but lacking life experiences in the real world. They are very attractive and elegant in their appearance overall.

The women's dresses were of the finest silks and they wear showy jewelry characteristic of Renaissance style. The men wear soldier-like attire, while both genders wear extravagant wigs and also change clothes numerous times throughout the length of the production. The costumes of the lovers were the fashion of the day, and the extravagance of the lovers costumes often represented the status of the commedia dell'arte company.

The lovers never wear the masks, which is characteristic of most of the other stock characters in the commedia dell'arte. They do, however, wear a large amount of makeup and apply beauty marks to their faces.

Their speech is very eloquent Tuscan, as they are of high social status. When commedia dell'arte is played in England, the lovers often speak in Received Pronunciation. They are well-read in poetry and often recite it at length from memory, and even tend to sing quite often. Their language is full of flamboyant and lofty rhetoric so that most of what they say is not taken too seriously, by either the audience or the other characters. Although their dramatics were laughable, their struggle as a romantic couple added a cultural layer and tone of seriousness to the show.

== Physicality ==
The lovers do everything perfectly and strive for perfection. Their movements are elegant and are not to be aimed towards parody. They occasionally do courtly dances using two dance movements called "pas" and "swivel".

The posture that the lovers take on is that of strong pride. They point their toes while standing and puff up their chests. Overall, they lack contact with the ground and seem to float across the ground rather than take steps. Their hand movements and gestures are also very characteristic of the buoyant movements that their feet take on. The physicality of the lovers should not be done in a way that makes fun of them.

== Relationships ==
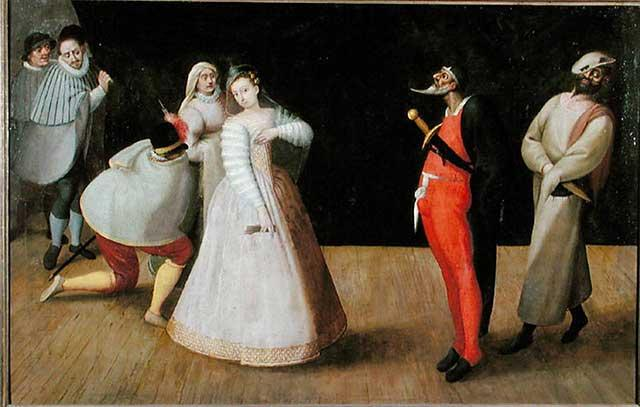
Commedia dell'arte troupe I Gelosi performing, by Hieronymus Francken I, c. 1590, with innamorata represented by the actress in the center

Following that, they do love each other, but are more consumed with the idea of being in love. They never outwardly communicate with their lover even when they are in close contact, due to nerves, and, therefore, never really outwardly express affection toward their beloved. The lovers commonly fight or bicker. Despite the bitter interactions, the lovers mostly reconcile their differences by the end of the play and end up happily together and/or married. The lovers are usually the children of either il Dottore or Pantalone. The lovers are aware of the audience's presence. They use the audience as a means to show themselves off and also to express their plight at not being able to obtain their love. In other ways, they may also call on an audience member for help or advice, or even flirt with one.

== Rhetorical conceits used ==
- Alliteration
- Allusion
- Antithesis
- Assonance
- Hyperbole
- Interrogation
- Invocation
- Irony
- Metaphor
- Prosopopoeia
- Conceit

== Entering and exiting ==
The lovers use uscite ('exits') and chiusette ('endings') sometimes when entering and exiting. These are rhyming couplets that are said before exiting and entering a scene.

== Variations on names ==
Since the lovers are stock characters, the names of both the male and female lovers are used over and over again:

=== Males ===
- Arsenio
- Aurielo
- Cinthio
- Fabrizio
- Flavio
- Fedelindo
- Florindo
- Flaminio
- Leandro
- Lélio
- Lindoro
- Mario
- Ortensio
- Ottavio
- Orazio
- Sireno, often the son of Pantalone
- Silvio
- Tristano

=== Females ===
- Angelica
- Aurelia
- Beatrice
- Bianchetta
- Celia
- Clarice
- Clori
- Cinzio
- Emilia
- Eularia
- Flaminia, played by Elena Balletti having inherited the role from her grandmother
- Florinda, famously portrayed by Virginia Ramponi-Andreini who also used "La Florinda" as her stage name
- Filesia
- Filli, often daughter of Pantalone
- Isabella
- Lavinia
- Lidia
- Ortensia
- Rosalinda
- Silvia
- Turchetta
- Vittoria

== See also ==
- Commedia dell'arte
