= Lelio Bisciola =

Italian historian

- Born: 1539; Modena, Italy
- Died: Unknown; Italy
- Scientific career
- Fields: Music, History

Lelio Bisciola was an Italian historian of music.

== Life ==
He was born in Modena in 1539 or 1540.

He was a Jesuit who spent most of time teaching. He was also an avid historian and writer of books on music. He wrote a number of books in both Latin and Italian.
