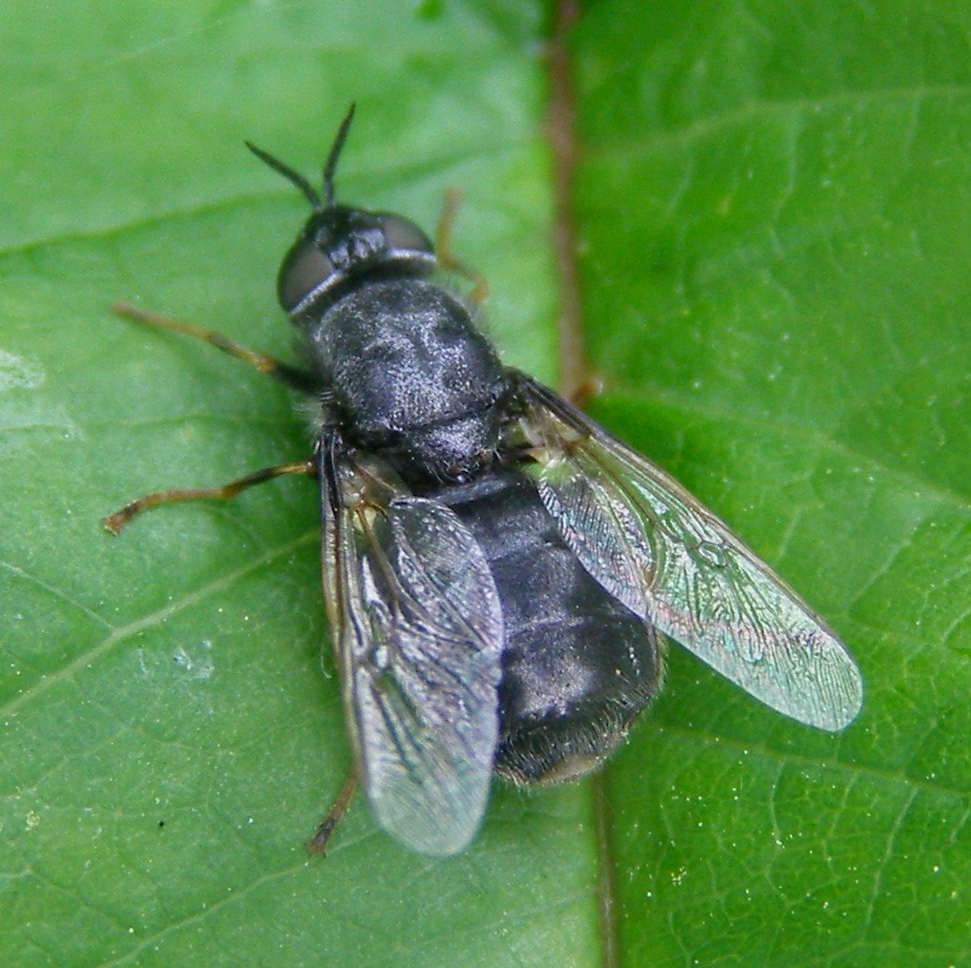

Scientific classification
- Kingdom: Animalia
- Phylum: Arthropoda
- Clade: Pancrustacea
- Class: Insecta
- Order: Diptera
- Family: Stratiomyidae
- Subfamily: Stratiomyinae
- Tribe: Stratiomyini
- Genus: Odontomyia
- Species: O. tigrina

Binomial name
- Odontomyia tigrina (Fabricius, 1775)

Synonyms
- Stratiomys tigrina Fabricius, 1775; Odontomyia atrata Verrall, 1909; Odontomyia nigrita (Fallén, 1817); Stratiomys nigrita Fallén, 1817; Stratiomys geniculata Stephens, 1829

= Odontomyia tigrina =

Species of fly

Odontomyia tigrina, also called the black colonel, is a European species of soldier fly.The following characters are diagnostic.Discal cell not conspicuously small; vein R2+3 present;discal cell emits only 2 veins (M3 absent) R4+5 forked. Abdomen dorsally entirely dark, with no coloured spots. Head in both sexes narrow and conical when seen in dorsal view; eyes of male sparsely, but distinctly hairy

== Distribution ==
Austria, Belgium, Bulgaria, Czech Republic, Denmark, England, France, Germany, Hungary, Italy, Kyrgyzstan, Lithuania, Netherlands, Poland, Romania, Russia, Scotland, Slovakia, Sweden, Switzerland.
