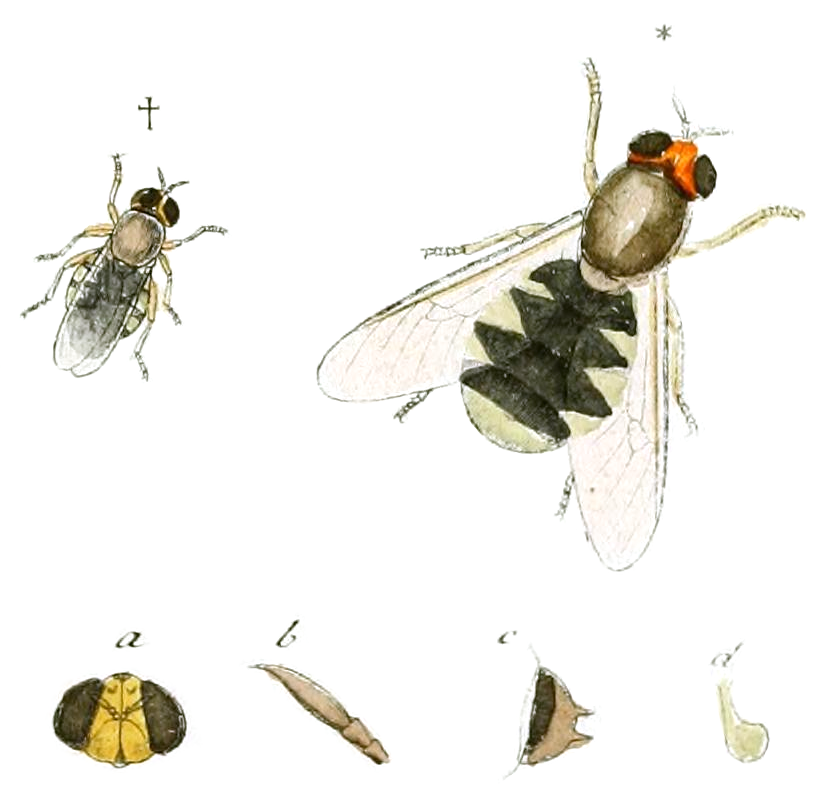

Scientific classification
- Kingdom: Animalia
- Phylum: Arthropoda
- Clade: Pancrustacea
- Class: Insecta
- Order: Diptera
- Family: Stratiomyidae
- Subfamily: Stratiomyinae
- Tribe: Stratiomyini
- Genus: Odontomyia
- Species: O. hydroleon

Binomial name
- Odontomyia hydroleon (Linnaeus, 1758)

Synonyms
- Musca hydroleon Linnaeus, 1758; Stratiomys felina Panzer, 1798; Odontomyia hydroteon Schiner, 1855; Odontomyia hydroleon var. alpina Jaennicke, 1866

= Odontomyia hydroleon =

Species of fly

Odontomyia hydroleon, also called the barred green colonel, is a European and Palearctic species of soldier fly.Diagnostic characters include:-Discal cell not conspicuously small; vein R2+3 present;discal cell emits 3 veins (M3 present), body not more than 10 mm. long.; frons narrower, rather swollen, predominantly yellow-brown with reddish-brown pattern;in both sexes face more prominent [than in Odontomyia angulata] between eyes, and distinctly snout-like. Lateral spots of abdomen smaller, so that the black areas to reach the lateral margin on each segment.

== Distribution ==
Afghanistan, Albania, Armenia, Austria, Belgium, Bulgaria, China, Czech Republic, Denmark, England, Wales, Estonia, Finland, France, Germany, Hungary, Israel, Lithuania, Mongolia, Netherlands, Norway, Poland, Romania, Russia, Slovakia, Sweden, Switzerland.
