= Marie Jeanne Riccoboni =

French actress and novelist (1713–1792)

Marie-Jeanne Riccoboni
- Born: Marie-Jeanne de La Boras; 25 October 1713; Paris, France
- Died: 7 December 1792 (aged 79); Paris, France
- Occupation: novelist
- Spouse: Antoine François Riccoboni
- Children: none
- Writing career
- Language: French
- Years active: 1757-1777
- Period: Old Regime / Enlightenment
- Genre: novel

Signature
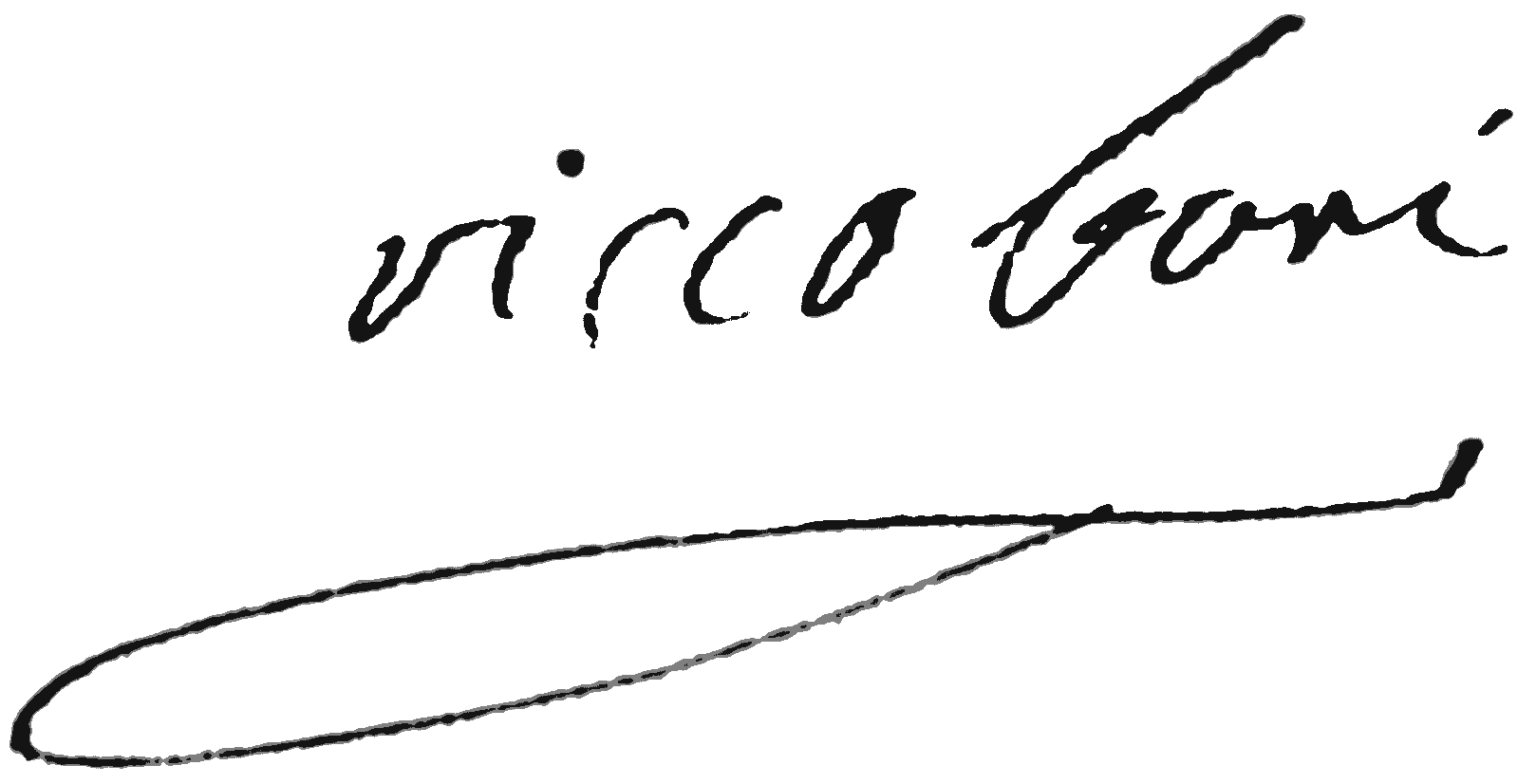

Marie-Jeanne Riccoboni (25 October 1713 – 7 December 1792) was a French actress and novelist.

== Early years ==
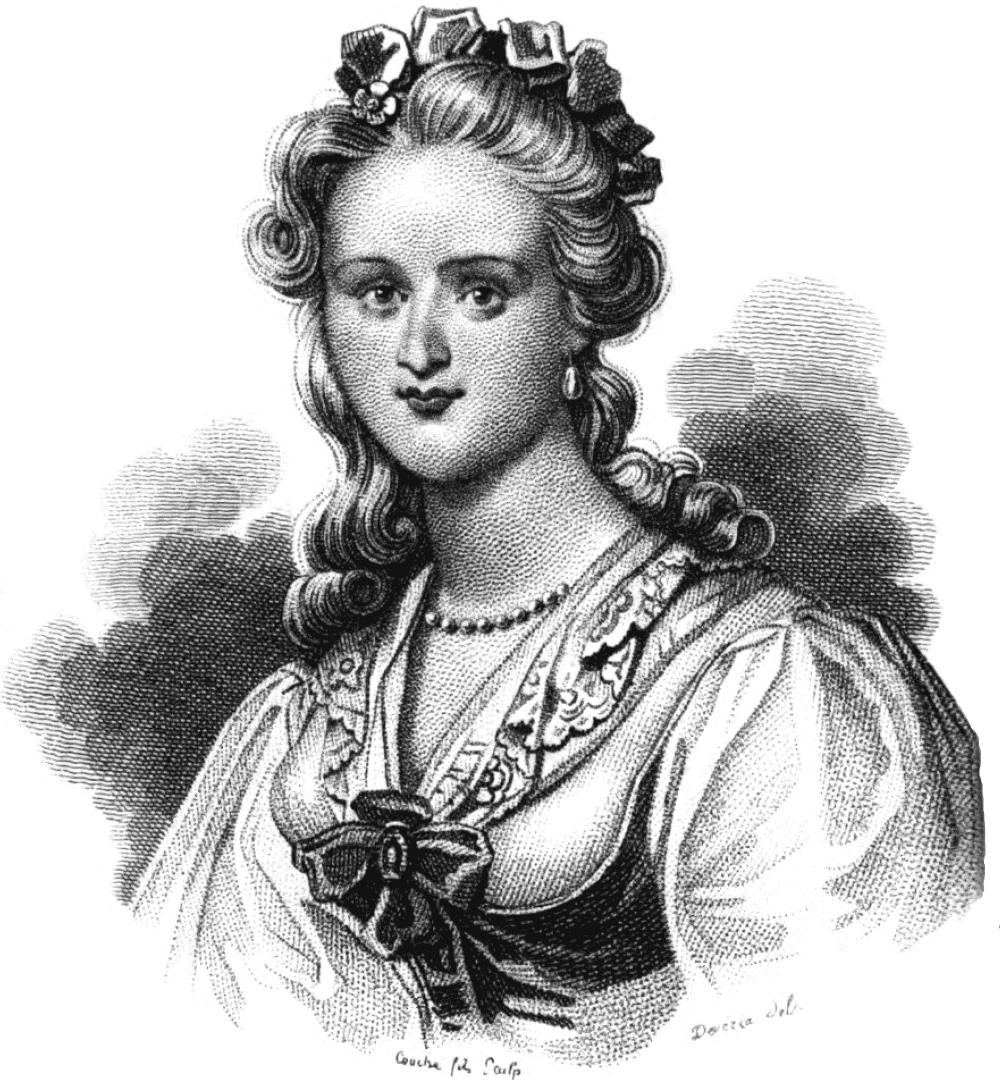
Portrait of Marie Jeanne Riccoboni by François Louis Couché

She was born in Paris on October 25, 1713. Her parents, Marie-Marguerite Dujac, of Paris, and Christophe du Heurles de Laboras, of Troyes, had been married on April 29, 1710 in the church of Sainte-Croix on the Ile de la Cité. Marie-Jeanne de Heurles de Laboras was baptized on October 26, 1713 in the Church of Saint-Eustache in Paris's first arrondissement. She would be married and buried in this same church.

The life of Marie-Jeanne and her mother was turned upside down in 1714 when Christophe du Heurles de Laboras was declared a bigamist in a court of law and ordered to return to his first wife in Troyes. Marie-Marguerite found herself abandoned and Marie-Jeanne was declared an illegitimate child. Her mother sent her to be raised in a convent and intended her to become a nun. But Marie-Jeanne had no religious vocation, and the nuns finally sent her back to her mother at age 14, in 1728. Her mother was not pleased with this turn of events, and their relationship was strained.

== Marriage and acting career ==
To escape her difficult mother, at age 20 Marie-Jeanne married Antoine François Riccoboni, an actor in the Comédie Italienne, the celebrated theater troupe led by his father, Luigi Riccoboni. She became an actress in this troupe and had some moderate success, though her friend Denis Diderot criticized her acting as wooden when arguing that those with the most sensitive natures do not make the best actors. Marie-Jeanne felt her talents would have been better suited to tragedy than to comedy; the illustrious Comédie Française, which put on dramatic plays, wanted to hire her, but her husband would not allow it.

It was an unhappy marriage, and, around 1755, Marie-Jeanne Riccoboni separated from her husband. Antoine François Riccoboni was described by a contemporary as living in "debauchery and depravity." Luigi Riccoboni, who died in 1753, had disinherited his son because of his poor character and conduct. Nevertheless, Marie-Jeanne helped support her husband financially for the rest of his life (he died in 1772).

== Career as a novelist ==
Wishing to leave the theater, Marie-Jeanne Riccoboni tried her hand at writing. Her first novel was Les Lettres de Mistriss Fanni Butlerd (1757), an epistolary novel in which the heroine, who has been betrayed by her lover, chooses to publish her letters to him to reveal his perfidy. The following year, Riccoboni published Histoire du marquis de Cressy, a carefully plotted third-person narrative that was also a tale of deception and betrayal. In 1759, she published Les Lettres de Juliette Catesby. Its translation by Frances Brooke into English the following year became an immediate success in England and it had six editions. These three novels were successful enough that Riccoboni was able to devote herself to writing full-time as of 1761.

Apart from authoring the works listed below, Riccoboni was the editor of a periodical, L'Abeille (1761), wrote a novel (1762) on the subject of Fielding's Amelia, and published a continuation of Marivaux's unfinished novel Marianne in 1761. She sought and received Marivaux's permission to publish this continuation, and impressed the public with her ability to adopt the original author's witty and intimate literary style, which had previously been deemed inimitable. Riccoboni also corresponded with Pierre Choderlos de Laclos, author of Les Liaisons Dangeureuses, as well as David Hume and the celebrated actor David Garrick.

Madame Riccoboni's work is among the most eminent examples of the "sensibility" novel; among the parallels cited in English literature are works by Laurence Sterne and Samuel Richardson. Her works have also been described as "letter novels" containing negotiations of femininity, desire, and ambition. She has influenced other writers, including Pierre Choderlos de Laclos and his literary aesthetics. Prominent admirers of her writing included Marie Antoinette, Denis Diderot, and Adam Smith.

Marie-Jeanne Riccoboni's work was not only praised by critics, but extremely popular with the public. According to historian Robert Darnton, she may have been the single best-selling author of the French eighteenth century. She was one of the few women authors at the time to make a living by writing. Although she achieved a great deal of acclaim, she also encountered obstacles due to her gender, such as a hostile, sexist critic denying her authorship (her early works were published anonymously or pseudonymously).

Riccoboni obtained a pension from the crown as recognition of her literary talent in 1772, but the Revolution deprived her of it, and she died in Paris on December 7, 1792 in great poverty.

== Literary works ==
Some of her better known works are:

- Lettres de mistriss Fanni Butlerd (1757)
- Histoire du marquis de Cressy (1758)
- Les Lettres de Juliette Catesby (1759), translated into English by Frances Brooke in 1760
- Histoire d'Ernestine (1765), which La Harpe thought her masterpiece
- three series of Lettres in the names of:
  - Adelaide de Dammartin (comtesse de Sancerre) (2 vol., 1766)
  - Elizabeth Sophie de Valliere (2 vol., 1772)
  - Milord Rivers (2 vol., 1776)

Novels in English translation:

- Letters of Mistress Fanni Butlerd, translated by Karen Santos da Silva. London: Modern Humanities Research Association, forthcoming in 2027.
- The Story of the Marquis de Cressy, translated by Kate Deimling. New York: MLA Press, 2025.
- Ernestine, translated by Joan Hinde Stewart and Philip Stewart. New York: MLA Press, 1998.

== Sources ==
- Bachaumont, Louis Petit de. Mémoires secrets de Bachaumont, etc. London: Adamson, 1777, vol. 6 (May 26, 1772)
- Crosby, Emily A. Une romancière oubliée: Mme Riccoboni: Sa vie, ses oeuvres, sa place dans la littérature anglaise et française du XVIII siècle. Geneva: Slatkine Reprints, 1970.
- Darnton, Robert. "Two Paths through the History of Ideas" in The Darnton Debate: Books and Revolution in the Eighteenth Century, ed. Haydn T. Mason. Studies on Voltaire and the Eighteenth Century 359 (1998).
- Deimling, Kate. "Introduction" in The Story of the Marquis de Cressy by Marie-Jeanne Riccoboni. New York: MLA Press, 2025.
- Diderot, Denis. Oeuvres esthétiques. Paris: Classiques Garnier, 1988.
- Nicholls, James C., ed. Mme Riccoboni's Letters to David Hume, David Garrick and Sir Robert Liston. Studies on Voltaire and the Eighteenth Century 149 (1976).
- Kaplan, Marijn S. Marie Jeanne Riccoboni's Epistolary Feminism: Fact, Fiction, and Voice. New York: Routledge, 2023.
