= R.D. Riccoboni =

American painter

Randy David Riccoboni (born 1960) is a painter known for his colorful architectural paintings, landscapes, and portrait work. He has used his work to bring attention to important issues affecting the LGBTQ+ community, especially the AIDS epidemic and the legalization of gay marriage in the U.S. He also uses his work to emphasize the beauty he finds in the architecture and landscapes around him and has compiled many of his works into books.

== Biography ==
Riccoboni was born in Fresno, California but spent his adolescent years in Redding, Connecticut. He is a cisgender gay man who uses he/him/his pronouns. Although his interest in art began when he was just four years old, he has no formal art education and is self-taught.

He settled down in California in 1993 after moving between New York and California for a couple years. Prior to his career in art, Riccoboni worked in banking and human resources. His move to California in 1993 and his resurgent pursuit of art coincided with the many losses he experienced due to the AIDS epidemic, including many of his close friends. He started printmaking and entered his work into charity fundraisers for the AIDs cure, including an AIDs project in West Hartford where one of his three entered pieces received "Best in Show." His artwork was discovered by Aubrey Walter, the founder of the UK Gay Liberation Front, who then wrote a book solely on Riccoboni on his work.

Riccoboni's art can be found at the Beacon Artworks Gallery, which he founded. His work can also be found on various social networking sites where he posts his work and interacts with other artists. He currently uses his experience in banking and human resources to market his work and to aid other artists in pricing their art so they may form stable careers as artists.

== Art and exhibitions ==
One of Riccoboni's most well-known works is "We Rise As We Lift Others," which is his interpretation of the day a sixty-foot rainbow pride flag was flown from the California Tower in Balboa Park, San Diego, to celebrate the legalization of gay marriage. This painting was displayed in the Sacramento State Capital building after it was viewed and brought over by Senator Toni G. Atkins but is now available for viewing with two of Riccoboni's other works in the San Diego History Center in Balboa Park.

The "lumbersexual," a bearded man whose outer appearance resembles that of a lumberjack, is often the focus of Riccoboni's work. He adds vibrant colors and patterns to create his own colorful interpretation of these men. The colors he chooses are based on the LGBTQ+ pride flag and are meant to emphasize a sense of community and inspire others to have a bright outlook on life.

Riccoboni has a collection of his stylized paintings of Balboa park compiled into a booklet titled "The Art Traveler Guide: A Portrait of Balboa Park." It is over fifty pages of his work and is designed to be carried on walk-through tours of the park. His paintings of the scenery and architectural structures of the park began ten years prior to the release of the booklet, which was created with Ann Jarmusch and the Save Our Heritage Organization (SOHO) in honor of the 100-year anniversary of the 1915 California-Panama Exposition.

Riccoboni participated in the collaborative Art & Architecture exhibition held throughout March 2021 at The Studio Door. For this exhibition, Riccoboni and other artists were brought together to recognize historic landmarks in San Diego.

=== Books ===
- Rainbow Nation: Paintings from the Gay Community by R.D. Riccoboni, Aubrey Walter (1996)
- The Art Traveler Guide: A Portrait of Balboa Park by R.D. Riccoboni (2015)
- The Big Picture: The Seven Step Guide For Creative Success In Business by R.D. Riccoboni (2012)
- From Old Town to New Town, San Diego Paintings by R.D. Riccoboni (2009)
