= Luigi Riccoboni =

Italian actor and theatre writer

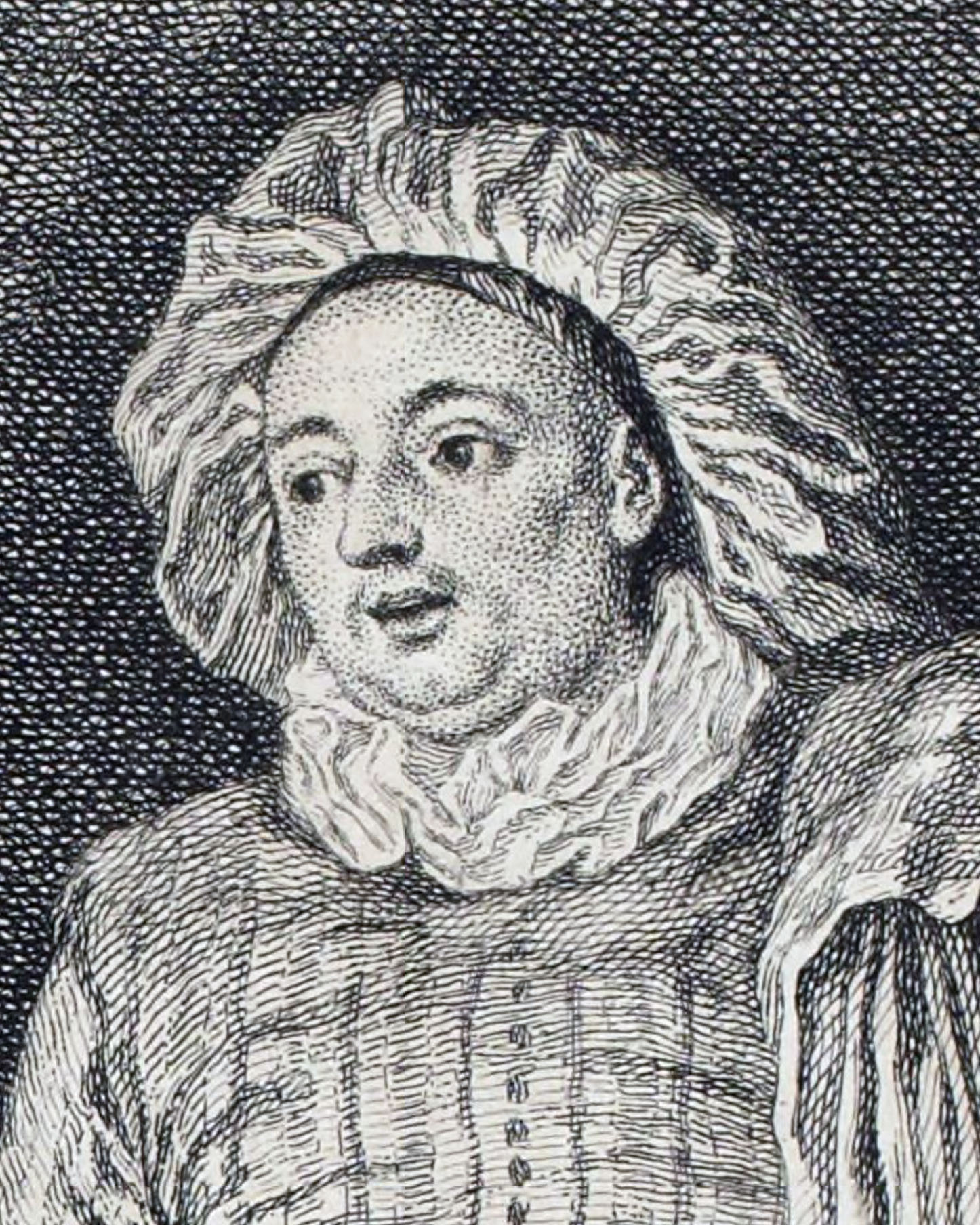
Proposed portrait of Luigi Riccoboni as Mezzetin, detail from L'amour au Théâtre Italien, engraved by Charles-Nicolas Cochin after a painting by Antoine Watteau

Luigi Riccoboni (1 April 1676 – 6 December 1753) was an Italian actor and writer on theatre, who was director of the Comédie-Italienne in Paris from 1716 to 1731. In France he was known as Louis Riccoboni and his stage name was Lélio.

== Early life and career ==
Born Luigi Andrea Riccoboni in Modena, Duchy of Modena and Reggio he was the son of Antonio Riccoboni, who played Pantalone in London in 1678–1679. In 1699 Luigi Riccoboni established a commedia dell'arte troupe in the French style in northern Italy, since in his view the Italian tradition had become overly decadent. He also translated some of the plays of Molière and Racine into Italian.

== Paris ==
In the spring of 1716 the French Regent, Philippe d'Orléans, asked his cousin, the Duke of Parma, to send him a troupe of Italian actors to revive the Comédie-Italienne in Paris, which had been disbanded nearly twenty years previous. To avoid some of the difficulties of the earlier troupe, he specified that its leader should be a man of good character and manners. Riccoboni was chosen, and in a few weeks he assembled a group of ten actors, all of whom were devout Christians. The troupe was meant to perform in the Hôtel de Bourgogne, which had been vacant since 1697, but that theatre needed renovation, so they initially played at the Théâtre du Palais-Royal on days when the Opéra was not performing. Even after moving to the Bourgogne, the troupe continued to perform at the Palais-Royal on Mondays and Saturdays until the death of the Regent in 1723.

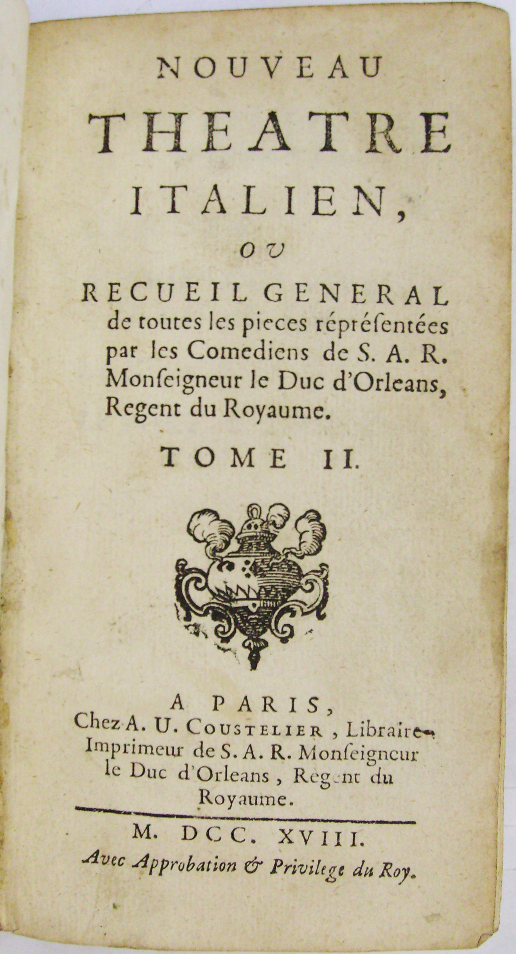
Play list, 1718

As a director, Riccoboni initially had difficulty retaining audiences with improvised plays in Italian. More and more he turned to written texts and a style of presentation that was tailored to local tastes, along with an ever increasing use of the French language. In February 1718 he successfully revived some of the old plays of Évariste Gherardi, the director of the Comédie-Italienne in the years prior to 1697. He himself wrote several plays, including L'Italien à Paris and L'Italien francisé in which Italian and French manners were juxtaposed. He also began to produce plays by French playwrights, such as Pierre Rémond de Sainte-Albine, whose scenario L'Amante difficile was performed in Italian. The first play entirely in French was Le Naufrage au Port à l'Anglais by Jacques Autreau. Riccoboni achieved his greatest acclaim for his expressive acting, particularly in the plays of Marivaux.

Riccoboni appeared in London in 1728–1729.

== Retirement ==
In 1729 he asked to retire with his wife and son; which was granted, while retaining for him and his wife a pension of 1000 livres each. He was at the Court of the Duke of Parma, who gave him the stewardship of his house; but the death of this Prince in 1731 produced his return finally to France.

In retirement he wrote several books on theatre in Italian and French. His Réflexions historiques sur les théâtres de l'Europe (Paris, 1738), although incomplete, was the first comparative study of the theatres of Italy, Spain, France, England, Holland, Flanders and Germany. It was translated into English as An Historical and Critical Account of the Theatres of Europe (London, 1741).

He died in Paris on 6 December 1753 and was buried at Saint-Sauveur.

== Personal life ==
Riccoboni married twice, first to actress Gabriella Gardellini (stage name Argentina), and second to Elena Balletti (1686–1771; stage name Flaminia). His son Antoine-François Riccoboni (1707–1772) was an actor who used the stage name Lélio fils and in 1734 married Marie-Jeanne de La Boras.

== Writings ==
- 1718: Hercule. Paris: Antoine-Urbain Coustelier. Copy at Google Books.
- 1723: La surprise de l'amour, comédie (with Pierre Marivaux). Paris: Veuve Guillaume. Copy at Gallica.
- 1726: Arcagambis tragedie en un acte (with Pierre-François Biancolelli and Antoine-François Riccoboni). Paris: Pissot; Flahault. Copy at Gallica.
- 1728: Histoire du theatre italien. Copy at Google Books.
- 1730–1731: Histoire du theatre italien, 2 volumes. Paris: André Cailleau. Vols. 1 and 2 at Google Books.
- 1736: Observations sur la comédie et sur le génie de Molière. Paris: Pissot. Copy at Gallica.
- 1741: An Historical and Critical Account of the Theatres of Europe (as Lewis Riccoboni). London: R. Dodsley. Copy at Google Books.
- 1743: De la Réformation du Théâtre sans nom d'imprimeur. 337 pp. Copies 1 and 2 at Google Books.
- 1761: Les caquets, comédie en trois actes en prose (with Antoine-François Riccoboni). Paris:Ballard. Copy at Gallica.

== Bibliography ==
- Anthony, James R. (2001). Riccoboni, Luigi Andrea [‘Lelio’], Grove Music Online (subscription, Wikilibrary access, or UK public library membership required).
- Banham, Martin, editor (1995). The Cambridge Guide to the Theatre. Cambridge: Cambridge University Press. ISBN 9780521434379.
- Brenner, Clarence D. (1961). The Théâtre Italien: Its Repertory, 1716–1793. Berkeley: University of California Press. OCLC 2167834.
- Courville, Xavier de (1943–1958). Luigi Riccoboni dit Lélio (un apôtre de l'art du théâtre au XVIII^{e} siècle), 3 volumes. Paris: L’Arche.
- Forman, Edward (2010). Historical Dictionary of French Theater. Lanham: The Scarecrow Press. ISBN 9780810849396.
- Hartnoll, Phyllis, editor (1983). The Oxford Companion to the Theatre (fourth edition). Oxford: Oxford University Press. ISBN 9780192115461.
- Heartz, Daniel (2004). From Garrick to Gluck: Essays on Opera in the Age of Enlightenment. Hillsdale, NY: Pendragon Press. ISBN 9781576470817.
- Jal, Auguste (1872). "RICCOBONI (Luigi)", p. 1057, in his Dictionnaire critique de biographie et d’histoire, 2nd edition. Paris: Plon.
- Léris, Antoine de (1754). "Lelio", pp. 476–477, in his Dictionnaire portatif des théatres. Paris: C. A. Jombert.
- Riccoboni, Louis (1730). Histoire du Théâtre Italien, 2 volumes. Paris: André Cailleau. Vols. 1 & 2 at HathiTrust.
- Senelick, Laurence (1995a). "Gherardi family", in Banham 1995, p. 427.
- Senelick, Laurence (1995b). "Riccoboni, family", in Banham 1995, p. 918.
- Smith, Winifred (1912). The Commedia dell'arte: A Study in Italian Popular Comedy. New York: Columbia University Press. Copy at Google Books; 1964 reprint (with added illustrations): New York: Blom.
