= Antoine-François Riccoboni =

Italian actor

Antoine-François Riccoboni (1707 – 15 May 1772) was an Italian actor of the Comédie-Italienne in Paris, whose stage name was Lélio fils.

== Life ==
He was born Antonio Francesco Valentino Riccoboni in Mantua. His father was the celebrated actor Luigi Riccoboni, who became the director of the Comédie-Italienne in Paris in 1716, and his mother was the actress Elena Balletti (1686–1771). In 1734 he married Marie-Jeanne de La Boras.

== Works ==
In addition to several pieces of verse, a Satire sur le goût, le Conte sans R, and some other poems, Antoine-François Riccoboni wrote a great number of comedies of which the best, Les Caquets, in three acts in prose, translated or imitated from Carlo Goldoni, was successfully revived at the Théâtre Louvois in 1802.

In 1726 he performed in Marivaux's La Surprise de l'amour. He wrote more than 50 comedies in French including:

- 1726: Les Comédiens esclaves
- 1732: Les Amusements à la mode
- 1735: Le Conte de Fée
- 1760: Le Prétendu
- 1760: Le Prétendu
- 1761: Les Caquets
- 1764: Les Amants de village

He also authored a treatise L'art du théâtre, published in 1750.

- 1750: Art dit Théâtre, Paris, in-8°.

== Bibliography ==
- Forman, Edward (2010). Historical Dictionary of French Theater. Lanham: The Scarecrow Press. ISBN 9780810849396.
- Hartnoll, Phyllis, editor (1983). The Oxford Companion to the Theatre (fourth edition). Oxford: Oxford University Press. ISBN 9780192115461.
- Senelick, Laurence (1995). "Riccoboni, family", p. 918 in The Cambridge Guide to the Theatre, edited by Martin Banham. Cambridge: Cambridge University Press. ISBN 9780521434379.
