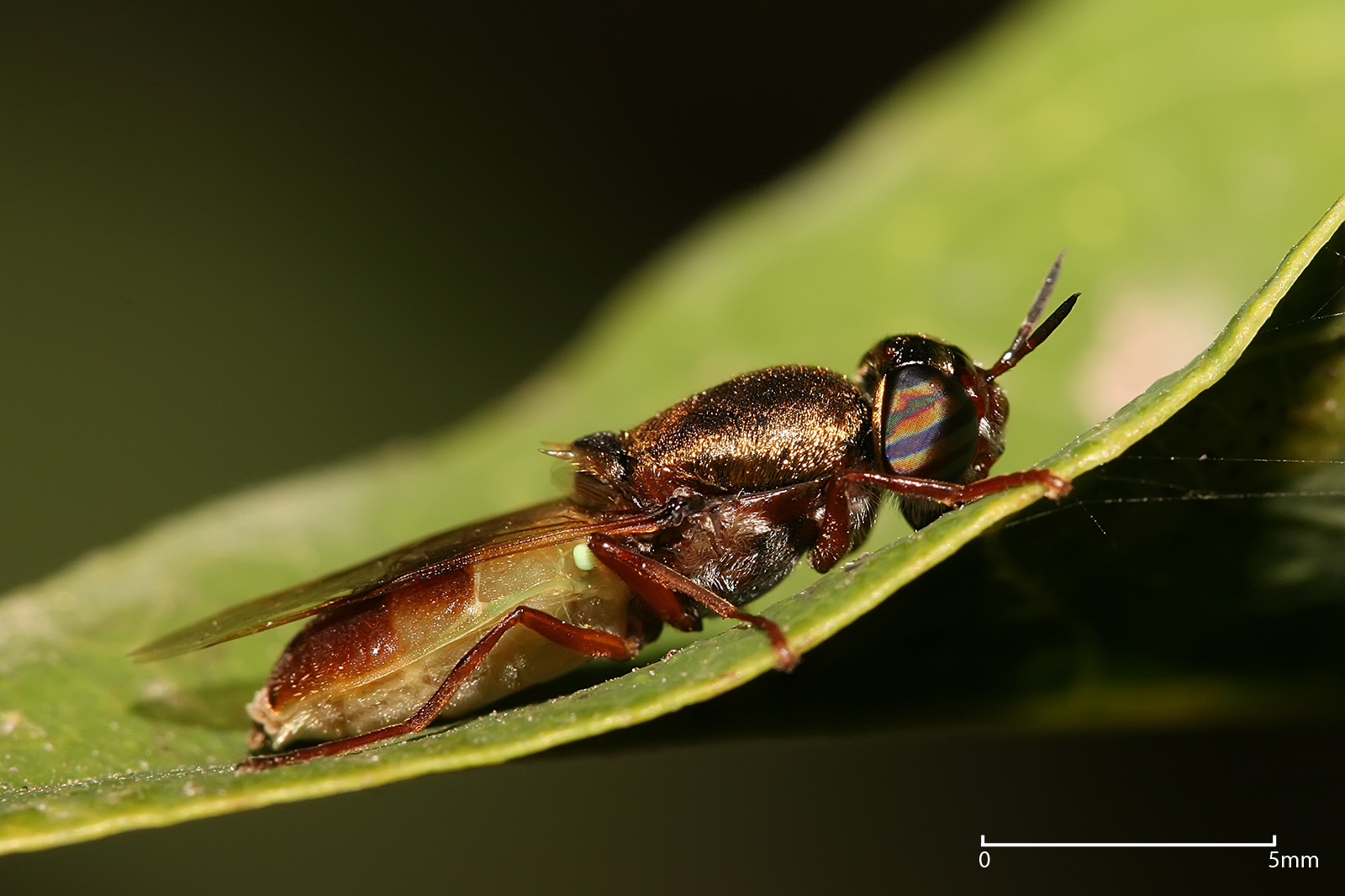

Scientific classification
- Kingdom: Animalia
- Phylum: Arthropoda
- Class: Insecta
- Order: Diptera
- Family: Stratiomyidae
- Subfamily: Stratiomyinae
- Tribe: Stratiomyini
- Genus: Odontomyia; Meigen, 1803

Type species
- Musca hydroleon Linnaeus, 1758

Diversity
- at least 220 species

Synonyms
- Achlyomyia Pleske, 1922; Catatasina Enderlein, 1914; Clitellariopsis Pleske, 1922; Clytellariopsis Szilády, 1941; Cyrtopus Bigot, 1883; Euceratomyia Rye, 1879; Euceratomys Bigot, 1888; Euceromyia Kertész, 1908; Euceromyia Wulp, 1896; Euceromys Bigot, 1877; Eularia Ôuchi, 1940; Neuraphanisis Enderlein, 1914; Odomtomyia Matsumura, 1915; Odonthomya Rondani, 1856; Odonthomyia Bellardi, 1859; Odontomeija Walker, 1860; Odontomga Oken, 1815; Odontomya Latreille, 1809; Odontomyiina Enderlein, 1930; Odontomyja Fabricius, 1805; Odotomyia Hua, 2006; Opseogymnus Costa, 1857; Orthogoniocera Lindner, 1951; Sratiomyiopsis Pleske, 1925; Stratiodonta Lindner, 1972; Stratiomyiopsis Pleske, 1922; Trichacrostylia Enderlein, 1914; Zoniomyia Pleske, 1922

= Odontomyia =

Genus of flies

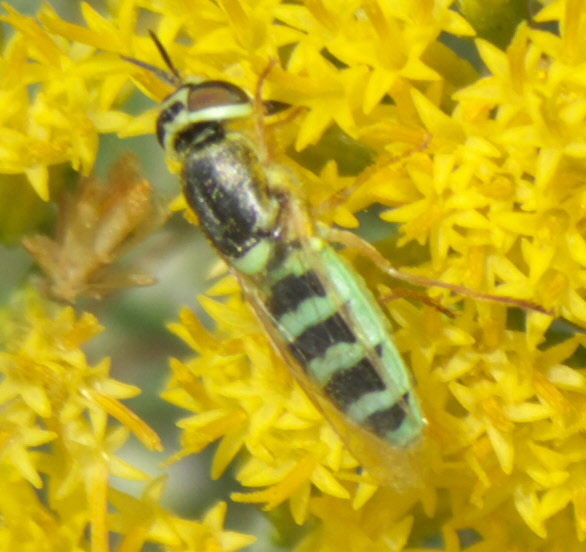

Odontomyia is a genus of soldier flies in the family Stratiomyidae.

== See also ==
- List of Odontomyia species
