= Myxosargus fasciatus =

Scientific classification
- Kingdom: Animalia
- Phylum: Arthropoda
- Class: Insecta
- Order: Diptera
- Family: Stratiomyidae
- Subfamily: Stratiomyinae
- Tribe: Prosopochrysini
- Genus: Myxosargus
- Species: M. fasciatus

Binomial name
- Myxosargus fasciatus Brauer, 1882

Synonyms
- Myxosargus pilosus James, 1942

Species of fly

Myxosargus fasciatus is a species of soldier fly belonging to the Stratiomyidae family.

== Distribution ==
United States, Guatemala, Mexico, Panama.
