= Myxosargus panamensis =

Scientific classification
- Kingdom: Animalia
- Phylum: Arthropoda
- Clade: Pancrustacea
- Class: Insecta
- Order: Diptera
- Family: Stratiomyidae
- Subfamily: Stratiomyinae
- Tribe: Prosopochrysini
- Genus: Myxosargus
- Species: M. panamensis

Binomial name
- Myxosargus panamensis Curran, 1929

Species of fly

Myxosargus panamensis is a species of soldier fly in the family Stratiomyidae.

== Distribution ==
Costa Rica, Panama.
