= Myxosargus knowltoni =

Scientific classification
- Kingdom: Animalia
- Phylum: Arthropoda
- Class: Insecta
- Order: Diptera
- Family: Stratiomyidae
- Subfamily: Stratiomyinae
- Tribe: Prosopochrysini
- Genus: Myxosargus
- Species: M. knowltoni

Binomial name
- Myxosargus knowltoni Curran, 1929

Species of fly

Myxosargus knowltoni is a species of soldier fly in the family Stratiomyidae.

== Distribution ==
United States
