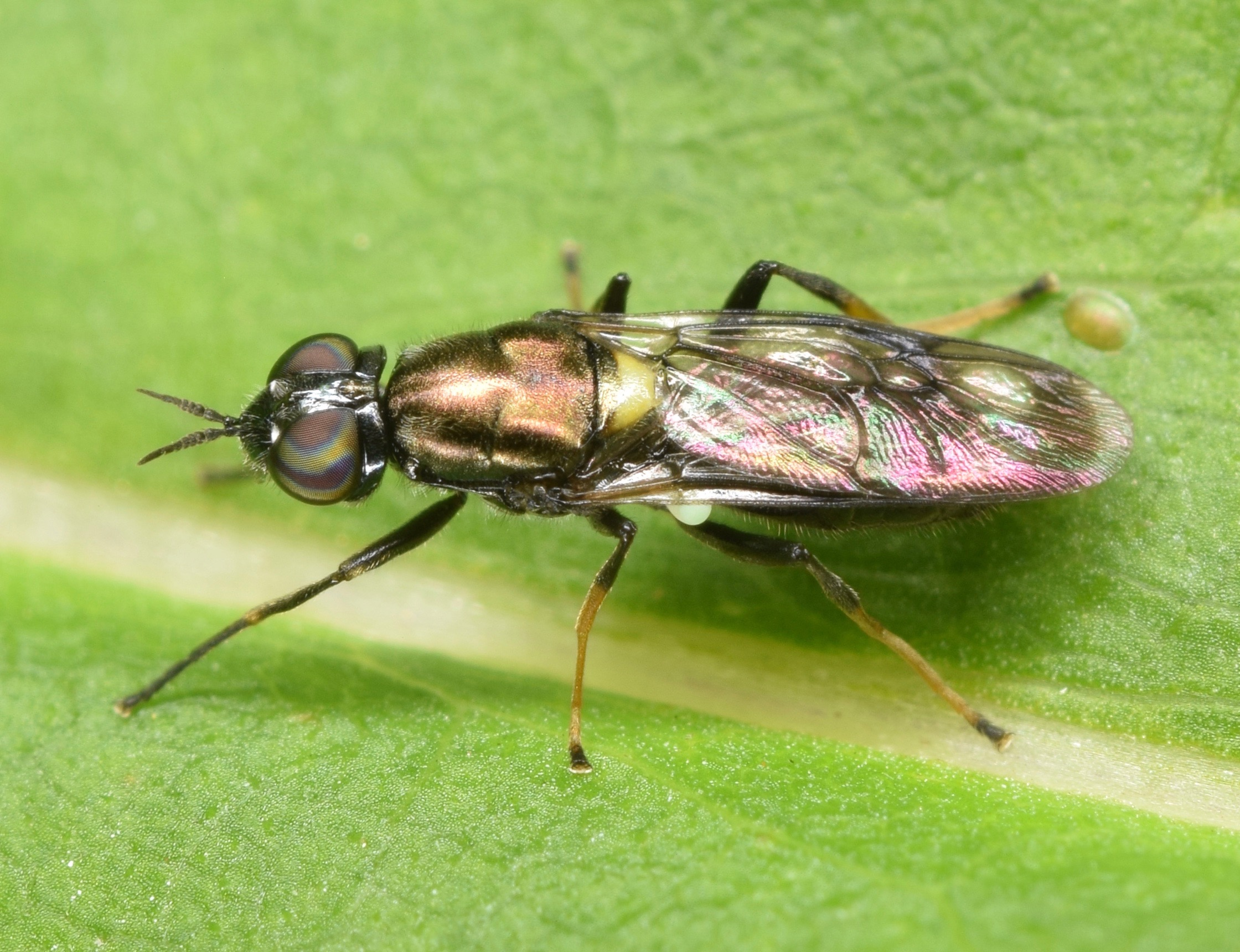
- Myxosargus nigricormis

Scientific classification
- Kingdom: Animalia
- Phylum: Arthropoda
- Clade: Pancrustacea
- Class: Insecta
- Order: Diptera
- Family: Stratiomyidae
- Tribe: Prosopochrysini
- Genus: Myxosargus
- Species: M. nigricormis

Binomial name
- Myxosargus nigricormis Greene, 1918

= Myxosargus nigricormis =

Species of fly

Myxosargus nigricormis is a species of soldier fly in the family Stratiomyidae.

== Distribution ==
United States
