= Myxosargus =

Scientific classification
- Kingdom: Animalia
- Phylum: Arthropoda
- Class: Insecta
- Order: Diptera
- Family: Stratiomyidae
- Subfamily: Stratiomyinae
- Tribe: Prosopochrysini
- Genus: Myxosargus; Brauer, 1882

Type species
- Myxosargus fasciatus Brauer, 1882

Genus of flies

Myxosargus is a genus of flies in the family Stratiomyidae.

== Species ==
- Myxosargus anomalus James, 1979
- Myxosargus braueri Williston, 1888
- Myxosargus fasciatus Brauer, 1882
- Myxosargus guatemalae James, 1942
- Myxosargus knowltoni Curran, 1929
- Myxosargus melanaspis James, 1979
- Myxosargus mystaceus James, 1979
- Myxosargus nigricormis Greene, 1918
- Myxosargus pacificus James, 1979
- Myxosargus panamensis Curran, 1929
- Myxosargus rugosifrons James, 1979
- Myxosargus scutellatus Williston, 1900
- Myxosargus texensis Curran, 1929
