= Illusionistic tradition =

Theatrical genre originated in Italy during the mid-2nd millennium

Illusionistic tradition is a style of theatre that was created in Italy during the Renaissance. Its focus was primarily centered on grandiose spectacle in theatrical performance. Stages made use of Italianate scenery, including a Proscenium arch, perspective, border flats, and a raked stage to create a visual image that had never before been used.

== See also ==
- Illusionism (art)
- Mimesis
