= Illusionism (art) =

Form of artistic expression

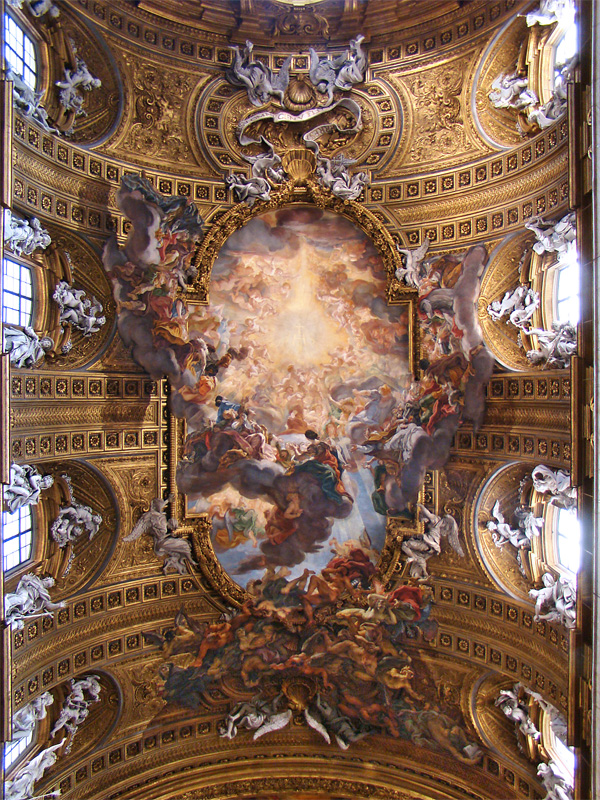
Triumph of the Name of Jesus, by Giovanni Battista Gaulli, on the ceiling of the Church of the Gesu. The decorations of the vault over the nave date back to the 17th century. The fresco is the work of Giovanni Battista Gaulli, known as Baciccia. The stucco reliefs were executed by Ercole Antonio Raggi and Leonardo Reti, following the drawings of Baciccia who wanted to effect a real continuity between painting and sculpture.

Illusionism in art history means either the tradition of art that appears to share the physical space with the viewer or more broadly the attempt to represent physical appearances precisely – also called mimesis. The latter can also be called realism, but the term can also mean the use of everyday subject-matter, or the avoidance of idealizing subjects. Illusionism encompasses a long history, from the deceptions of Zeuxis and Parrhasius to the works of muralist Richard Haas in the twentieth century, that includes trompe-l'œil, anamorphosis, optical art, abstract illusionism, and illusionistic ceiling painting techniques such as di sotto in sù and quadratura. Sculptural illusionism includes works, often painted, that appear real from a distance. Other forms, such as the illusionistic tradition in the theatre, and Samuel van Hoogstraten's "peepshow"-boxes from the seventeenth century, combine illusionistic techniques and media.

== Illusionistic realism ==
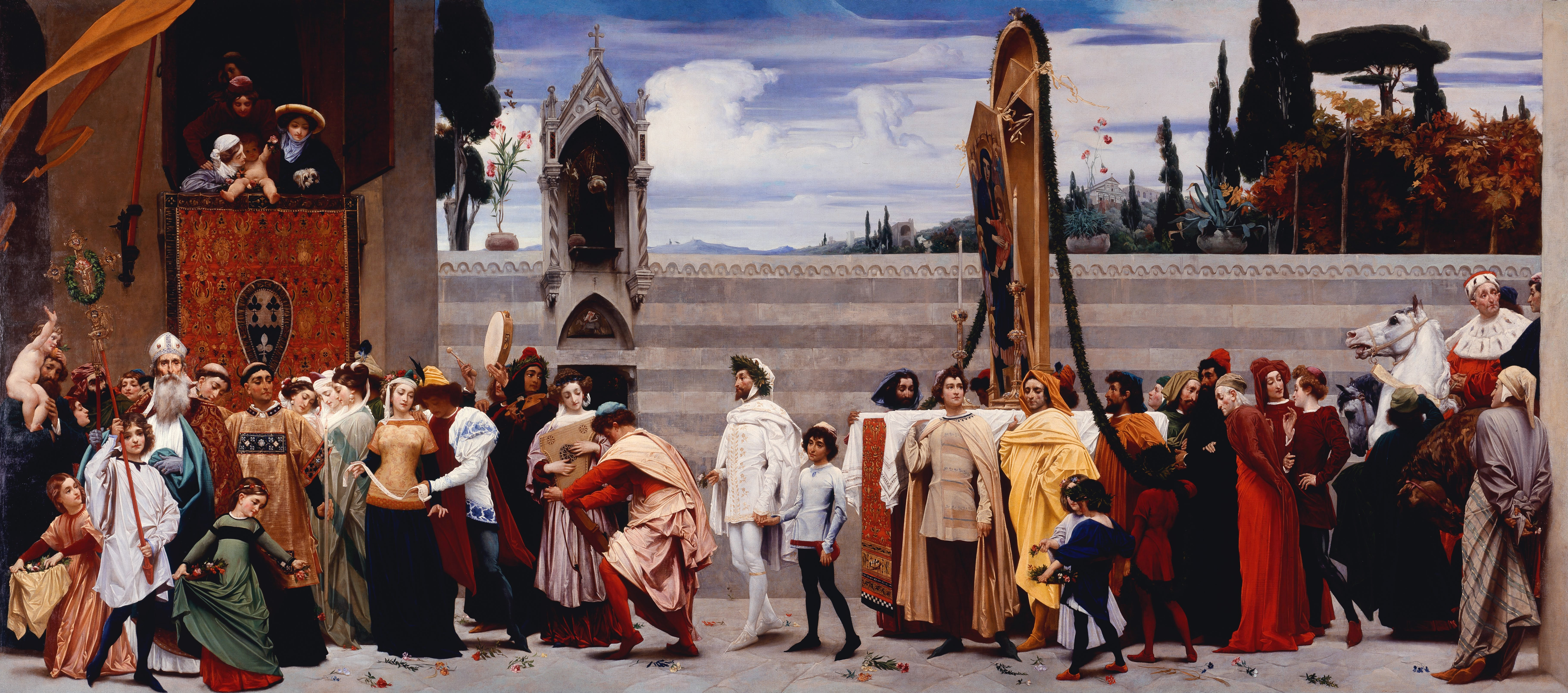
Lord Leighton's Cimabue's Madonna Carried in Procession of 1853–1855 is at the end of a long tradition of illusionism in painting, but is not Realist in the sense of Courbet's work of the same period.

The development of increasingly accurate representation of the visual appearances of things has a long history in art. It includes elements such as the accurate depiction of the anatomy of humans and beasts, of perspective and effects of distance, and of detailed effects of light and colour. The Art of the Upper Paleolithic in Europe achieved remarkably lifelike depictions of beasts, and Ancient Egyptian art developed conventions involving both stylization and idealization that nevertheless allowed very effective depictions to be produced very widely and consistently. Ancient Greek art is commonly recognised as having made great progress in the representation of anatomy, and has remained an influential model ever since. No original works on panels or walls by the great Greek painters survive, but from literary accounts, and the surviving corpus of derivative works (mostly Graeco-Roman works in mosaic) it is clear that illusionism was highly valued in painting. Pliny the Elder's famous story of birds pecking at grapes painted by Zeuxis in the 5th century BC may well be a legend, but indicates the aspiration of Greek painting. As well as accuracy in shape, light and colour, Roman paintings show an unscientific but effective knowledge of representing distant objects smaller than closer ones, and representing regular geometric forms such as the roof and walls of a room with perspective. This progress in illusionistic effects in no way meant a rejection of idealism; statues of Greek gods and heroes attempt to represent with accuracy idealized and beautiful forms, though other works, such as heads of the famously ugly Socrates, were allowed to fall below these ideal standards of beauty. Roman portraiture, when not under too much Greek influence, shows a greater commitment to a truthful depiction of its subjects.

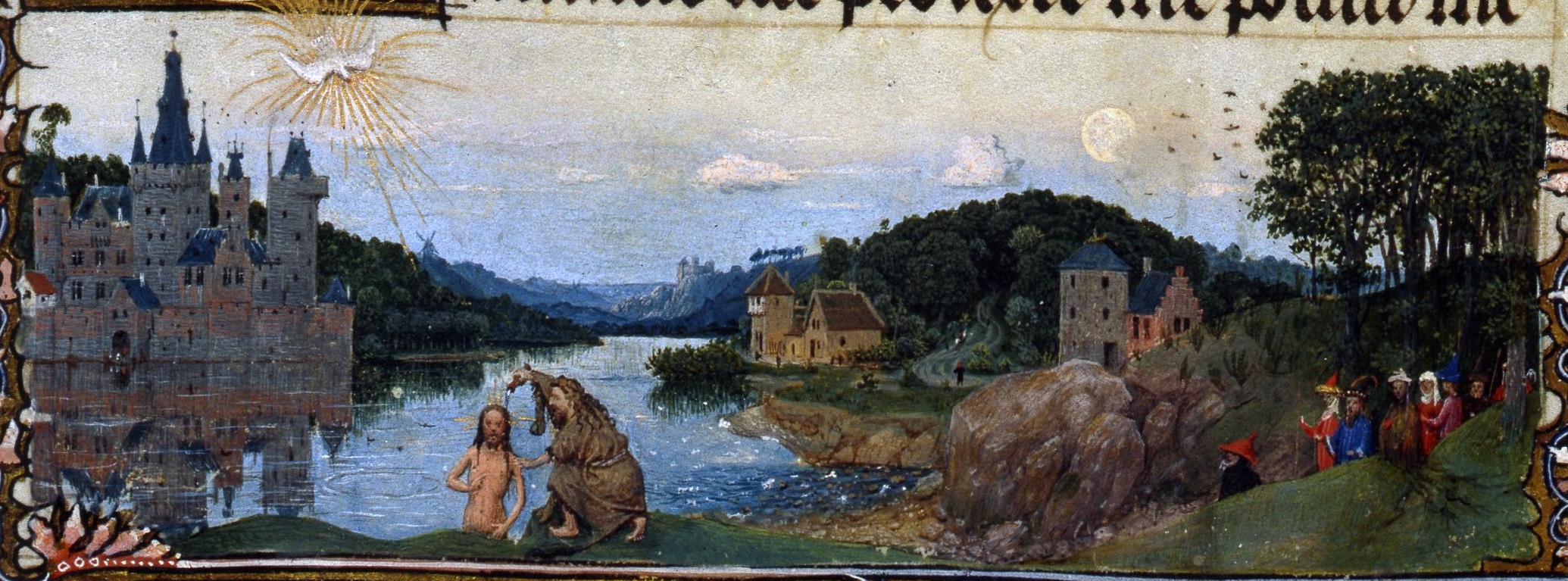
Bas-de-page of the Baptism of Christ, "Hand G" (Jan van Eyck?), Turin-Milan Hours. An advanced illusionistic work for c. 1425, with the dove of the Holy Ghost in the sky.

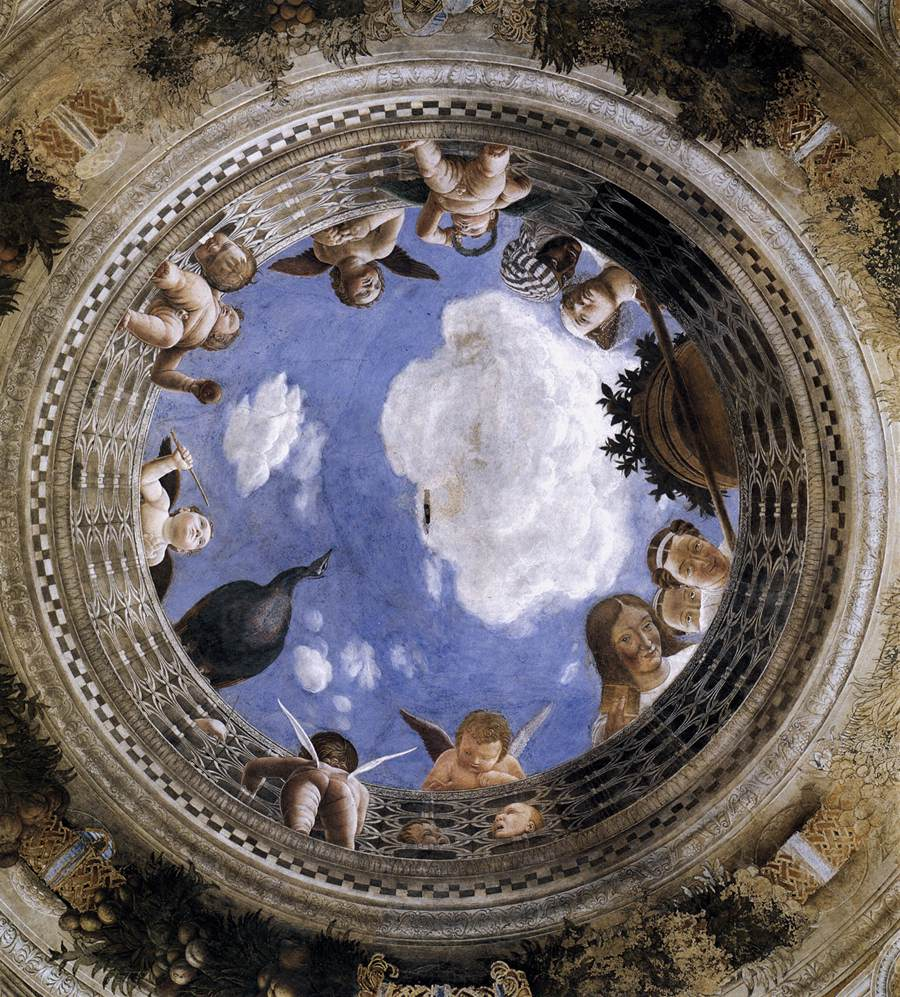
Andrea Mantegna's late-Quattrocento ceiling fresco in the Camera degli Sposi (commissioned by Ludovico III Gonzaga for Mantua's Ducal Palace) is an early example of illusionistic ceiling painting.

The art of Late Antiquity famously rejected illusionism for expressive force, a change already well underway by the time Christianity began to affect the art of the elite. In the West classical standards of illusionism did not begin to be reached again until the Late medieval or Early Renaissance period, and were helped by the development of new techniques of oil painting which allowed very subtle and precise effects of light to be painted using very small brushes and several layers of paint and glaze. Scientific methods of representing perspective were developed in Italy and gradually spread across Europe, and accuracy in anatomy rediscovered under the influence of classical art. As in classical times, idealism remained the norm.

The accurate depiction of landscape in painting had also been developing in Early Netherlandish and Renaissance painting, and was then brought to a very high level in 17th-century Dutch Golden Age painting, with very subtle techniques for depicting a range of weather conditions and degrees of natural light. After being another development of Early Netherlandish painting, by 1600 European portraiture could give a very good likeness in both painting and sculpture, though the subjects were often idealized by smoothing features or giving them an artificial pose. Still life paintings, and still life elements in other works, played a considerable role in developing illusionistic painting, though in the Netherlandish tradition of flower painting they long lacked "realism", in that flowers from all seasons were typically used, either from the habit of assembling compositions from individual drawings, or as a deliberate convention; the large displays of bouquets in vases, though close to modern displays of cut flowers that they have influenced, were entirely atypical of 17th-century habits, where flowers were displayed one at a time. Intriguingly, having led the development of illusionic painting, still life was to be equally significant in its abandonment in Cubism.

== Donald Judd ==
In his writings and art criticisms during the mid-1960s art critic and artist Donald Judd claimed that illusionism in painting undermined the artform itself. Judd implied that painting was dead, claiming painting was a lie because it depicted the illusion of three-dimensionality on a flat surface. Judd claimed that painting needed to recognize its objecthood in real space and reject illusion. Donald Judd wrote in “Specific Objects” in 1965:

Three dimensions are real space. That gets rid of the problem of illusionism and of literal space, space in and around marks of color… Actual space is intrinsically more powerful and specific than paint on a flat surface.
