= Deaths in July 1979 =

The following is a list of notable deaths in July 1979. Entries for each day are listed alphabetically by surname. A typical entry lists information in the following sequence:

- Name, age, country of citizenship at birth, subsequent country of citizenship (if applicable), reason for notability, cause of death (if known), and reference.

== July 1979 ==
=== 1 ===
- Eduard Bargheer, 77, German painter.
- Vsevolod Bobrov, 56, Soviet ice hockey player and footballer.
- Bernard George Ellis, 88, British soldier.
- Lee Jackson, 57, American blues musician, shot.
- Huang Minlon, 80, Chinese pharmaceutical chemist.
- Bob McDonald, 83, Australian footballer.
- Douglas McKenzie, 73, Australian cricketer.
- Angus McLean, 53, British football player and manager.
- Shūzō Takiguchi, 75, Japanese poet and artist
- Richard Ward, 64, American actor, heart attack.

=== 2 ===
- Bao Huiseng, 84, Chinese politician.
- Carlyle S. Beals, 80, Canadian astronomer.
- Joan Craven, 81, English photographer.
- Anthony Eustrel, 76, English actor.
- Sir Ian Freeland, 66, British general.
- Henry Goodwin, 69, American jazz trumpeter.
- Thomas Hewlett, Baron Hewlett, 55, British businessman and life peer.
- Anton Kaltenberger, 75, Austrian Olympic bobsledder (1936).
- Gedalia Schorr, 68, Polish-American rabbi, heart attack.
- Larisa Shepitko, 41, Soviet filmmaker (The Ascent), traffic collision.
- Ed Stauffer, 81, American baseball player.

=== 3 ===
- Michel Dard, 70–71, French novelist.
- Louis Durey, 91, French composer.
- Franklin M. Jahnke, 79, American politician, member of the Wisconsin State Assembly (1957–1969).
- Léon Rigon, 93, French Olympic equestrian (1924).
- Charlotte Tiedemann, 60, German singer and actress.

=== 4 ===
- Rose Haas Alschuler, 91, American educator.
- Max Beier, 76, Austrian arachnologist.
- Wal Campbell, 72, Australian journalist.
- John Davies, 63, British businessman and politician, MP (1970–1978), brain cancer.
- Frank H. Ellis, 85, Canadian aviator.
- Marion Greeves, 84, British politician.
- Roelof Hordijk, 62, Dutch Olympic fencer (1948).
- Patrick Kerrigan, 51, Irish politician, TD (since 1977).
- Tadeusz Kilanowicz, 39, Polish ice hockey player.
- Theodora Kroeber, 82, American anthropologist and writer, cancer.
- Waldron Lavers, 68, Canadian politician.
- Lee Wai Tong, 73, Hong Kong football player and executive.
- Emzy Harvey Lynch, 83, American football and basketball coach.
- Mihri Pektaş, 83–84, Turkish politician and educator.
- Aurel Rădulescu, 25, Romanian footballer, fall.
- Marjorie Rhodes, 82, English actress.
- Mendy Rudolph, 53, American basketball referee, heart attack.
- Florimond Vanhalme, 84, Belgian footballer.

=== 5 ===
- Joseph Borkin, 67, American lawyer and writer.
- Émile Dewoitine, 86, French aviation executive.
- Bill Henderson, 78, American basketball coach.
- Rolf Holmberg, 64, Norwegian footballer.
- Judson Laire, 76, American actor (Mama).
- Li Shu-hua, 88, Chinese-American politician and biophysicist, heart attack.
- P. S. Namboodiri, 63–64, Indian politician.
- Michael Parsons, 6th Earl of Rosse, 72, British hereditary peer.
- J. Barton Payne, 56, American theologian, climbing accident.
- Clifford Benjamin Peterson, 74, Canadian politician.
- Gilbert Stead, 91, British physicist.
- Jopie Waalberg, 59, Dutch Olympic swimmer (1936).
- Sir Geoffrey Wallinger, 76, British diplomat.
- Ernst Woermann, 91, German diplomat and Nazi official.

=== 6 ===
- Antonio María Barbieri, 86, Uruguayan Roman Catholic cardinal, complications from Parkinson's disease.
- Luisa Guidotti Mistrali, 47, Italian missionary, shot.
- Malcolm Hulke, 54, British screenwriter (Doctor Who), cancer.
- George Lesnea, 77, Romanian poet and translator.
- Van McCoy, 39, American musician ("The Hustle"), heart attack.
- Márcia Mendes, 34, Brazilian journalist and actress.
- Jim Morden, 79, Australian footballer.
- Marino Moretti, 93, Italian poet and author.
- Ernst Palandt, 72, German organ builder.
- Elizabeth Ryan, 87, American-British tennis player.

=== 7 ===
- Lydia Kaʻonohiponiponiokalani Aholo, 101, American linguist and educator.
- Billy Dean Anderson, 44, American career criminal, shot.
- Hélène Cazès-Benatar, 80, Moroccan lawyer and human rights activist.
- Dalton Conyngham, 82, South African cricketer.
- Michael Fearnley, 42, English cricketer.
- John Hore, 71, New Zealand rugby player.
- David Karr, 61, American journalist, businessman and Soviet spy, heart attack.
- Friedrich Knauer, 82, German chemist.
- Børge Larsen, 68, Danish Olympic runner (1936).
- Josef Machaň, 73, Czech Olympic long jumper (1924).
- Friedrich Mauz, 79, German psychiatrist.
- Sir Cameron Nicholson, 81, British general.
- Robert Opel, 39, American photographer, shot.
- Earl S. Piper, 74, American general.
- Ahmad Qandil, 68, Saudi Arabian poet.
- Edwin Rich, 74, English historian.
- Emilio Solanet, 92, Argentine veterinarian.
- Sara Mildred Strauss, 82, American dancer and choreographer.
- Morris Talpalar, 79, American sociologist.

=== 8 ===
- Hans Fuglsang-Damgaard, 88, Danish Lutheran prelate.
- Joe W. Kelly, 69, American general.
- John Reed King, 64, American game show host, heart attack.
- Kyar Ba Nyein, 55, Burmese Olympic boxer (1952), colorectal cancer.
- Charles Kynard, 46, American jazz musician, heart attack.
- Tommaso Landolfi, 70, Italian novelist.
- Margarita Miranda Bordoy, 59–60, Spanish sporting director.
- Shin'ichirō Tomonaga, 73, Japanese physicist, Nobel Prize laureate (1965), throat cancer.
- Michael Wilding, 66, English actor (Under Capricorn), fall.
- Guy Wilson, 71, English rugby player.
- Herman Witkin, 62, American psychologist.
- Robert Burns Woodward, 62, American chemist, Nobel Prize laureate (1965), heart attack.
- Margareta Xenopol, 87, Romanian singer, pianist and composer.

=== 9 ===
- Aksel Berg, 85, Soviet naval admiral and radio engineer.
- James C. Dempsey, 70, American naval admiral, heart failure.
- A. P. Elkin, 88, Australian anthropologist.
- Noemi Gabrielli, 77, Italian art historian.
- Betty Evans Grayson, 53, American softball player, breast cancer.
- Robert König, 94, Austrian mathematician.
- Alexander Hugh McDonald, 71, New Zealand-British historian.
- Roddy McMillan, 56, Scottish actor and playwright, heart attack.
- Cornelia Otis Skinner, 80, American writer and actress, stroke.
- Louise Kidder Sparrow, 95, American sculptor and poet, heart attack.
- Don Stewart, 65, Australian footballer.

=== 10 ===
- Gérard Barras, 42, Swiss Olympic pole vaulter (1960).
- Adrianus Djajasepoetra, 85, Indonesian Roman Catholic prelate.
- Harald Færstad, 89, Norwegian Olympic gymnast (1920).
- Arthur Fiedler, 84, American conductor (Boston Pops), heart attack.
- Kathryn E. Granahan, 84, American politician, member of the U.S. House of Representatives (1956–1963).
- Mamie Odessa Hale, 68, American public health official.
- John D. Lavelle, 62, American general, heart attack.
- Dave Magnier, 63, Irish footballer.
- Graham Beresford Parkinson, 82, New Zealand general.
- Hoël Pattisson, 73, English cricketer.
- Modesto Rodas Alvarado, 58, Honduran politician, cardiac arrest.
- Leonard Squirrell, 85, English artist.
- Sam Taub, 92, American journalist and radio broadcaster.

=== 11 ===
- Giorgio Ambrosoli, 45, Italian lawyer, shot.
- Harold Hunter Armstrong, 95, American novelist.
- Walter Arnold, 69, German sculptor.
- David M. Bosworth, 82, American surgeon and medical educator.
- Robert Harold Compton, 92, English-South African botanist.
- James Underwood Crockett, 63, American gardener, author and television personality (The Victory Garden), cancer.
- Hermann Glockner, 82, German philosopher.
- Jean Gutweniger, 86, Swiss Olympic gymnast (1924).
- Fat Kitching, 66, Australian footballer.
- John Lacey, 77, American woodcarver.
- Ivan Morozov, 74, Soviet general.
- Narasimharaju, 55, Indian actor.
- Theodor Rossiwall, 63, Austrian flying ace.
- Sigvard Thurneman, 70, Swedish gangster (Sala gang).
- Claude Wagner, 54, Canadian politician, MP (1972–1978), cancer.

=== 12 ===
- Georgy Beriev, 76, Soviet Georgian general.
- Juan Alberto Castro, 45, Argentine footballer.
- Carmine Galante, 69, American mobster (Bonanno crime family), shot.
- Fred Lane, 86–87, French-born English jockey.
- Andy Laurie, 47, Australian rugby player.
- Tom Lovelace, 81, American baseball player.
- Jim Luken, 57, American politician, mayor of Cincinnati (1976–1977), member of the Ohio House of Representatives (1973–1975), cancer.
- Olive Morris, 27, Jamaican-born British feminist and Black nationalist, non-Hodgkin lymphoma.
- Minnie Riperton, 31, American singer ("Lovin' You"), breast cancer.
- Dick Robertson, 79, American singer and songwriter.
- Sir John Slessor, 82, British air marshal.
- Kalervo Tuukkanen, 69, Finnish composer.
- Geoff Weber, 64, Australian footballer.

=== 13 ===
- Ralph Buckley, 72, American football player.
- Ceil Chapman, 67, American fashion designer, lung cancer.
- Lubbertus Götzen, 84, Dutch politician.
- Corinne Griffith, 84, American actress (The Divine Lady) and film producer, heart attack.
- Mervyn Griffith-Jones, 70, British jurist.
- Amedeo Grillo, 78, Italian Olympic boxer (1924).
- Ilmari Haimi, 71, Finnish Olympic equestrian (1952).
- Bob Lane, 32, Australian footballer and police officer, shot.
- Joseph Lookstein, 76, Russian-born American rabbi, complications from a stroke.
- John MacDermott, Baron MacDermott, 83, Northern Irish politician and jurist.
- Atholstan Mahoney, 70, New Zealand rugby player.
- Ludwig Merwart, 65, Austrian artist.
- Juraj Neidhardt, 77, Yugoslav architect.
- Lesley Riddle, 74, American country musician.
- Robert Speck, 70, Romanian Olympic handball player (1936).

=== 14 ===
- Walter Christopherson, 81, New Zealand cricketer.
- George DeWitt, 56, American singer and game show host (Name That Tune), heart attack.
- Francis Dry, 87, New Zealand geneticist.
- Pedro Flores, 85, Puerto Rican composer.
- Walter Keppel, 9th Earl of Albemarle, 97, British soldier and hereditary peer.
- Dame Anne Loughlin, 85, British trade unionist.
- Billy McCrary, 32, American professional wrestler, traffic collision.
- David Barsum Perley, 77, Ottoman-born American writer and Assyrian nationalist activist.
- Suresh, 49, Indian actor.
- Abuna Theophilos, 69, Ethiopian Orthodox Tewahedo prelate, abuna (since 1971), strangled.
- Walter Nathan Tobriner, 77, American diplomat and politician, cancer.
- Santos Urdinarán, 79, Uruguayan footballer.

=== 15 ===
- Kamal Amin, 56, Egyptian artist.
- Dame Kitty Anderson, 76, British academic administrator.
- James Archer, 79, New Zealand rugby player.
- Georges Jean Marie Darrieus, 90, French aeronautical engineer.
- Gustavo Díaz Ordaz, 68, Mexican politician, president (1964–1970), colorectal cancer.
- Henri Gillard, 77, French Roman Catholic priest.
- Bengt Hamilton, 87, Swedish-American pediatrician.
- Frederick Hanson, 84, New Zealand engineer, soldier and public servant.
- Garrell Hartman, 66, American baseball player.
- Kurt Hohenberger, 71, German jazz trumpeter.
- John Holland, 69, American baseball executive.
- Juana de Ibarbourou, 87, Uruguayan poet, heart attack.
- Vladimir Konstantinov, 58, Soviet fighter pilot.
- Bengt Ljungquist, 66, Swedish Olympic fencer (1948, 1952).
- Haakon Sløgedal, 78, Norwegian politician.

=== 16 ===
- W. Gordon Brown, 75, Canadian theologian.
- Percival Brundage, 87, American accountant and government official.
- Duarte de Freitas do Amaral, 70, Portuguese politician.
- Alfred Deller, 67, English singer, heart attack.
- Sir Harold Finch, 81, Welsh politician, MP (1950–1970)
- Domingo González, 31, Colombian footballer, traffic collision.
- Dahlia Greidinger, 52, Israeli chemist, cancer.
- Léo Marion, 80, Canadian chemist and academic administrator, cancer.
- James Francis McIntyre, 93, American Roman Catholic cardinal.
- Victor Nicolas, 73, French sculptor, traffic collision.
- Kathleen Romoli, 81, American anthropologist, stroke.
- Mary Scott, 90, New Zealand novelist.
- Olof Sköldberg, 69, Swedish Olympic sport shooter (1952, 1956).
- John Spalding, 81, American jurist.
- Peter Stevens, 60, German-Canadian fighter pilot and intelligence officer.
- Winnifred Train, 75, New Zealand nurse.

=== 17 ===
- Edward Akufo-Addo, 73, Ghanaian politician and jurist, president (1970–1972).
- Reinhold Furth, 85, Czech-British physicist.
- Doug Meintjes, 89, South African cricketer.
- Egil Holst Torkildsen, 62, Norwegian Nazi activist and journalist.
- John Walton, 51, English footballer.

=== 18 ===
- Peter Angell, 47, British footballer, heart attack.
- Matthew Gee, 53, American trombonist.
- Robert Heizer, 64, American archaeologist.
- Emilio Lorenzini, 55, Chilean politician.
- Enrico Migliavacca, 78, Italian football player and manager.
- Rita Montagnana, 84, Italian politician.
- Johann Nikuradse, 84, Georgian-born German physicist.
- Pavel Prokkonen, 70, Soviet politician.
- Kurt Reinhard, 64, German musicologist
- Butch Van Artsdalen, 38, American surfer, liver failure.

=== 19 ===
- Helen Bradley, 78, English painter.
- Paul Bransom, 93, American painter and illustrator.
- Helena Cehak-Holubowiczowa, 77, Polish archaeologist.
- Jorge Dowling, 75, Chilean politician.
- Allan Maruff, 68, Indian-Australian businessman, cirrhosis.
- Guglielmo Segato, 73, Italian Olympic racing cyclist (1932).
- Jean Vallée, 80, French filmmaker.
- Adomas Varnas, 100, Lithuanian-American artist.

=== 20 ===
- Sir Herbert Butterfield, 78, English historian.
- Lois Dwight Cole, 76, American children's author.
- Volney Davis, 77, American convicted bank robber.
- Helen Eby-Rock, 83, American actress.
- Wilhelm Eitel, 88, German-American minerologist.
- István Fazekas, 49, Hungarian Olympic boxer (1952).
- George Hawkins, 70, Australian footballer.
- Kenneth B. Hobson, 71, American general.
- Kosti Kankainen, 85, Finnish politician.
- Isabelle Keith, 81, American actress.
- Wilhelm Ladewig, 72, German Olympic track and field athlete (1928).
- Ike Martin, 92, American football player and coach.
- John C. McBride, 70, American politician, heart attack.
- Nguyễn Lương Bằng, 75, Vietnamese politician, vice president (since 1976).
- Albertina Ramírez, 81, Nicaraguan Roman Catholic nun.
- Hans-Joachim Schuke, 71, German organ builder.
- Harry L. Snead, 89, American politician, member of the Virginia House of Delegates (1920–1922).
- Bertil Sundberg, 72, Swedish chess player.
- Shōji Yamagishi, 48–49, Japanese magazine editor and photography critic, heart disease.

=== 21 ===
- Marie-Jeanne Bernard, 70, Luxembourgish Olympic swimmer (1928).
- William H. F. Brothers, 93, American Old Catholic prelate and activist.
- Yvonne Gardelle, 81, American actress and dancer.
- Selene Gifford, 78, American social worker and government official, colon cancer.
- Boris Giuliano, 48, Italian police chief, shot.
- Juan Guzmán Cruchaga, 84, Chilean poet and diplomat.
- Arthur L. Hammond, 82, American missionary.
- Francisco Mateo, 62, Spanish-French footballer.
- Malcolm Patrick Murray, 74, British civil servant, colon cancer.
- Sidney L. Pressey, 90, American psychologist, developer of the teaching machine.
- Eddie Price, 53, American football player, heart attack.
- Ludwig Renn, 90, German author and communist activist.
- Wayne Souza, 21, American football player, drowned.
- Rexford Tugwell, 88, American economist and politician, governor of Puerto Rico (1941–1946).
- Eugène Vinaver, 80, Russian-born British literary scholar, lymphoma.
- Iris Woolcock, 83, American artist, suicide by gunshot.

=== 22 ===
- Thomas Byström, 85, Swedish Olympic equestrian (1932).
- J. V. Cain, 28, American football player, congenital heart defect.
- Kathleen Case, 45, American actress.
- Tony Galento, 69, American boxer, heart attack.
- Albert Gilles, 83, French artist.
- Sybil Holmes, 90, American politician, member of the Massachusetts Senate (1937–1939).
- Reuben Leon Kahn, 91, Russian-American immunologist.
- Sándor Kocsis, 49, Hungarian footballer, fall.
- Alfred Rode, 74, Italian-born French composer.
- Stein Rokkan, 58, Norwegian sociologist.
- Jonathan Sangaya, 71, Malawian Presbyterian priest.
- Amos Strunk, 90, American baseball player.

=== 23 ===
- Mathieu Ahlersmeyer, 83, German singer and actor.
- Joseph Kessel, 81, French journalist and novelist.
- Birgit Kronström, 74, Finnish actress and singer.
- Rina Massardi, 82, Italian-Uruguayan singer and filmmaker.
- Al McIntosh, 73, American journalist.
- Jack McNab, 83, New Zealand rugby player.
- Robert Wilson Shaw, 66, Scottish rugby player.
- Lefty West, 63, American baseball player.
- Ernesto Zanzi, 75, Italian racing cyclist.

=== 24 ===
- Bask, 23, Polish-American Thoroughbred racehorse, colic.
- Dominador Camerino, 79, Filipino politician.
- Cláudio, 38, Brazilian footballer.
- Archie Duncan, 65, Scottish actor.
- Gordon Chung-Hoon, 68, American naval admiral.
- Jeanne Leuba, 96, French journalist.
- Edward Stachura, 41, Polish poet, suicide by hanging.
- Otto Zimmermann, 86, Swiss chess player.

=== 25 ===
- Jimmy Binder, 76, American baseball player.
- Maarten de Niet Gerritzoon, 75, Dutch politician.
- Robert L. Denig, 94, American general.
- Alexander Key, 74, American novelist (Escape to Witch Mountain).
- Elsa Kidson, 74, New Zealand soil scientist.
- Zuheir Mohsen, 43, Palestinian politician, shot.
- Connie Neenan, 84, Irish hurler.
- Eric Pohlmann, 66, Austrian-British actor (From Russia with Love, Thunderball), heart attack.
- Joan Refshauge, 72, Australian medical practitioner and educator.
- Littorio Sampieri, 52, Italian Olympic gymnast (1952).

=== 26 ===
- Virginia Brissac, 96, American actress.
- Sir Charles Clore, 74, British businessman and philanthropist, cancer.
- Bill DeKoning, 60, American baseball player.
- Ovidiu Forai, 60, Romanian Olympic wrestler (1952).
- Caroline Rose Foster, 102, American farmer and philanthropist.
- Dieter Koulmann, 39, German footballer.
- Henry H. Krusekopf, 94, American soil scientist.
- Carlo Rizzo, 72, Italian actor.
- Frank W. Spencer, 96, American civil rights activist and maritime pilot.
- Stefan Wiechecki, 82, Polish writer and journalist.

=== 27 ===
- Antonio Cerrotti, 78, Argentine footballer.
- Gustavo Cochet, 85, Argentine artist.
- James Cragg, 92, English cricketer.
- Ernest Crosbie, 69, American Olympic race walker (1932, 1936, 1948).
- Gábor Cseh, 62, Hungarian Olympic canoeist (1936).
- George R. Harrison, 81, American physicist.
- Olha Hasyn, 65, Soviet Ukrainian nationalist activist.
- Ettore Manni, 52, Italian actor, self-inflicted gunshot wound.
- Shirley Mason, 78, American actress, cancer.
- Martin McLaren, 65, British politician, MP (1959–1966, 1970–1974).
- George Dunbar Moore, 85, Australian naval admiral and diplomat.
- Henri Saint Cyr, 77, Swedish Olympic equestrian (1952, 1956).
- Sun Weiru, 82–83, Chinese general.
- Sōkichi Takagi, 85, Japanese naval admiral and politician.
- Davidson Taylor, 72, American radio broadcaster.
- Arnold Webster, 80, Canadian politician, MP (1962–1965).

=== 28 ===
- Holly Campbell, 72, American track and field athlete and engineer.
- William Neil Campbell, 94, Canadian politician.
- André Cherrier, 74, French Olympic high jumper (1928).
- Sir Cecil Dormer, 96, British diplomat.
- Gotfred Johan Hølvold, 76, Norwegian politician.
- Jules Irving, 54, American theatre director and producer, heart attack.
- Charles Henry Juliá Barreras, 71, Puerto Rican politician.
- Don Miller, 77, American football player and coach.
- Fred Pigott, 83–84, English rock climber.
- Väinö Rainio, 83, Finnish Olympic track and field athlete (1924, 1928).
- Herbert Rehbein, 57, German songwriter.
- Wolfgang Reinhardt, 70, German filmmaker.
- George Seaton, 68, American filmmaker and playwright, cancer.
- Charles Shadwell, 81, British conductor and bandleader.
- Frederick Stafford, 51, Slovak-Australian actor (Topaz), plane crash.
- Steffen Toppe, 76, Norwegian politician.
- Gudina Tumsa, 49–50, Ethiopian theologian, strangled.
- Roman Turyn, 78, Soviet Ukrainian artist.
- John Wosky, 74, American architect.

=== 29 ===
- Phil Boutelje, 83, American pianist and composer.
- John B. Breckinridge, 65, American politician, member of the U.S. House of Representatives (1973–1979), heart attack.
- Enid, Lady Burnham, 85, Argentine-born English scouting leader.
- David Campbell, 64, Australian poet, cancer.
- Émilie Carles, 79, French writer and activist.
- Chester C. Chattin, 71, American jurist, stroke.
- Feofan Davitaia, 67, Soviet Georgian geographer.
- Torsten Eriksson, 88, Swedish Olympic diver (1912).
- Tom Kerrigan, 73, American football player.
- Norma Koch, 81, American costume designer (What Ever Happened to Baby Jane?, Lady Sings the Blues, Hush...Hush, Sweet Charlotte).
- Clarence Manion, 83, American lawyer, academic administrator and radio personality, complications from a stroke.
- Herbert Marcuse, 81, German-American philosopher and political theorist, stroke.
- Radu Mironovici, 79, Romanian far-right political activist, liver failure.
- Maxwell Rich, 65, American general.
- Bill Todman, 62, American television producer (The Price Is Right, What's My Line?), complications from heart surgery.

=== 30 ===
- Cyril Abraham, 63, English screenwriter (The Onedin Line), liver failure.
- James Badrian, 39, Zimbabwean Olympic boxer (1960).
- Leo Clements, 71, Australian footballer.
- Lew Kowarski, 72, French physicist.
- Edward A. Krug, 67, American historian and writer.
- Alf Maiden, 56, Australian businessman and public servant.
- Bishnupada Mukerjee, 76, Indian pharmacologist.
- Edmund Stadler, 70, German Olympic runner (1936).
- Andy Wilson, 63, British Olympic wrestler (1948).

=== 31 ===
- José Della Torre, 73, Argentine footballer.
- Ethel B. Dietrich, 87, American economist.
- Frede Hansen, 82, Danish Olympic gymnast (1920).
- William Blakely Jones, 72, American jurist.
- Joseph Kotalla, 71, German SS commander and war criminal.
- Beatrix Lehmann, 76, British actress and novelist.
- Frank Moseley, 68, American football player and coach.
- Ion Niculi, 92, Romanian politician.
- Ina Perham, 90, American painter.
- Theodor Pröpper, 83, German organist and composer.
- R. Bruce Waddell, 64, American politician, member of the Illinois House of Representatives (since 1969), heart attack.
