= Tragedy =

Genre of drama based on human suffering

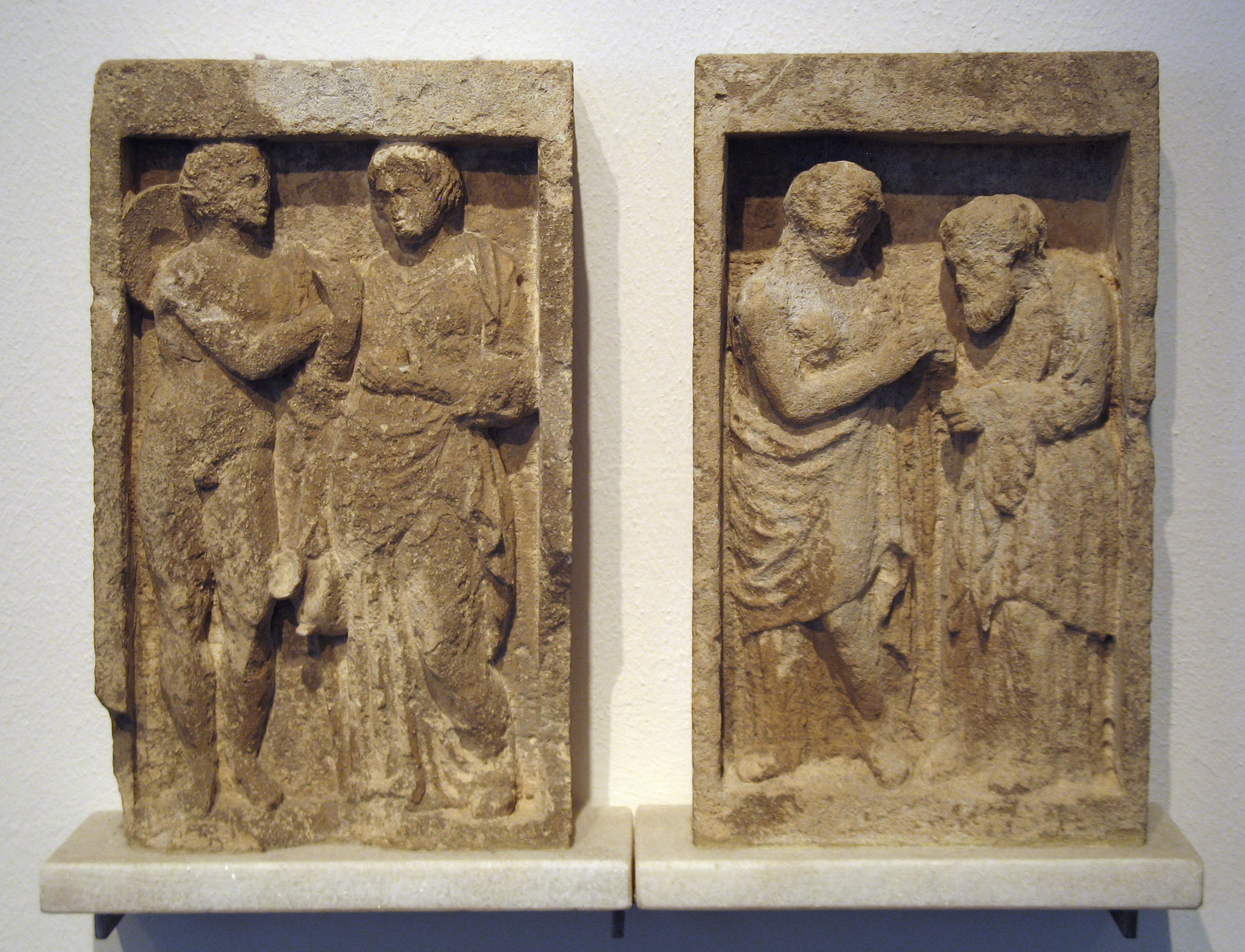
Reliefs from Tarentum (Modern Day Taranto) believed to depict scenes from Greek tragedy: at left Electra and Orestes, who murder their mother Clytemnestra in order to avenge their father, Agamemnon; Clytemnestra was motivated by Agamemnon taking the princess Cassandra as concubine, and by Agamemnon sacrificing their daughter Iphigenia. At right is Oedipus and Antigone; Oedipus was abandoned as an infant and adopted by a shepherd; he then unknowingly murdered his father and married his mother, siring children including Antigone. When Oedipus became aware of what he had done, he put out his own eyes in horror; his daughter here guides him.

A tragedy is a genre of drama based on human suffering, specifically by way of terrible or sorrowful events that befall a main character or cast of characters. Traditionally, the intention of tragedy is to invoke an accompanying catharsis, or a "pain [that] awakens pleasure," for the audience. While many cultures have developed forms that provoke this paradoxical response, the term tragedy often refers to a specific tradition of drama that has played a unique and important role historically in the self-definition of Western civilization. That tradition has been multiple and discontinuous, yet the term has often been used to invoke a powerful effect of cultural identity and historical continuity—"the Greeks and the Elizabethans, in one cultural form; Hellenes and Christians, in a common activity," as Raymond Williams puts it.

Originating in the theatre of ancient Greece 2500 years ago, where only a fraction of the works of Aeschylus, Sophocles and Euripides survive, as well as many fragments from other poets, and the later Roman tragedies of Seneca; through its singular articulations in the works of Shakespeare, Lope de Vega, Jean Racine, and Friedrich Schiller to the more recent naturalistic tragedy of Henrik Ibsen and August Strindberg; Nurul Momen's Nemesis' tragic vengeance & Samuel Beckett's modernist meditations on death, loss and suffering; Heiner Müller postmodernist reworkings of the tragic canon, tragedy has remained an important site of cultural experimentation, negotiation, struggle, and change. A long line of philosophers—which includes Plato, Aristotle, Saint Augustine, Voltaire, Hume, Diderot, Hegel, Schopenhauer, Kierkegaard, Nietzsche, Freud, Benjamin, Camus, Lacan, and Deleuze—have analysed, speculated upon, and criticised the genre.

In the wake of Aristotle's Poetics (335 BCE), tragedy has been used to make genre distinctions, whether at the scale of poetry in general (where the tragic divides against epic and lyric) or at the scale of the drama (where tragedy is opposed to comedy). In the modern era, tragedy has also been defined against drama, melodrama, the tragicomic, and epic theatre, with the result that some of the Greek tragedies have come to appear as tragicomedies and melodramas. Drama, in the narrow sense, cuts across the traditional division between comedy and tragedy in an anti- or a-generic deterritorialization from the mid-19th century onwards. Both Bertolt Brecht and Augusto Boal define their epic theatre projects (non-Aristotelian drama and Theatre of the Oppressed, respectively) against models of tragedy. Taxidou, however, reads epic theatre as an incorporation of tragic functions and its treatments of mourning and speculation.

== Etymology ==
The word "tragedy" appears to have been used to describe different phenomena at different times. It derives from Ancient Greek τραγῳδία "goat song", which comes from τράγος tragos "he-goat" and ᾠδή ōidḗ "singing, ode." Scholars suspect this may be traced to a time when a goat was either the prize in a competition of choral dancing or was what a chorus danced around prior to the animal's ritual sacrifice. In another view on the etymology, Athenaeus of Naucratis (2nd–3rd century CE) says that the original form of the word was trygodia from trygos (grape harvest) and ode (song), because those events were first introduced during grape harvest.

Writing in 335 BCE (long after the Golden Age of 5th-century Athenian tragedy), Aristotle provides the earliest surviving explanation for the origin of the dramatic art form in his Poetics, in which he argues that tragedy developed from the improvisations of the leader of choral dithyrambs (hymns sung and danced in praise of Dionysos, the god of wine and fertility):

Anyway, arising from an improvisatory beginning (both tragedy and comedy—tragedy from the leaders of the dithyramb, and comedy from the leaders of the phallic processions which even now continue as a custom in many of our cities), [tragedy] grew little by little, as [the poets] developed whatever [new part] of it had appeared; and, passing through many changes, tragedy came to a halt, since it had attained its own nature.

— Poetics IV, 1449a 10–15

In the same work, Aristotle attempts to provide a scholastic definition of what tragedy is:

Tragedy is, then, an enactment of a deed that is important and complete, and of [a certain] magnitude, by means of language enriched [with ornaments], each used separately in the different parts [of the play]: it is enacted, not [merely] recited, and through pity and fear it effects relief (catharsis) to such [and similar] emotions.

— Poetics, VI 1449b 2–3

There is some dissent to the dithyrambic origins of tragedy, mostly based on the differences between the shapes of their choruses and styles of dancing. A common descent from pre-Hellenic fertility and burial rites has been suggested. Friedrich Nietzsche discussed the origins of Greek tragedy in his early book The Birth of Tragedy (1872). Here, he suggests the name originates in the use of a chorus of goat-like satyrs in the original dithyrambs from which the tragic genre developed.

Scott Scullion writes:

There is abundant evidence for tragôidia understood as "song for the prize goat". The best-known evidence is Horace, Ars poetica 220-24 ("he who with a tragic song competed for a mere goat"); the earliest is the Parian Marble, a chronicle inscribed about 264/63 BCE, which records, under a date between 538 and 528 BCE: "Thespis is the poet ... first produced ... and as prize was established the billy goat" (FrGHist 239A, epoch 43); the clearest is Eustathius 1769.45: "They called those competing tragedians, clearly because of the song over the billy goat"...

== Greek ==
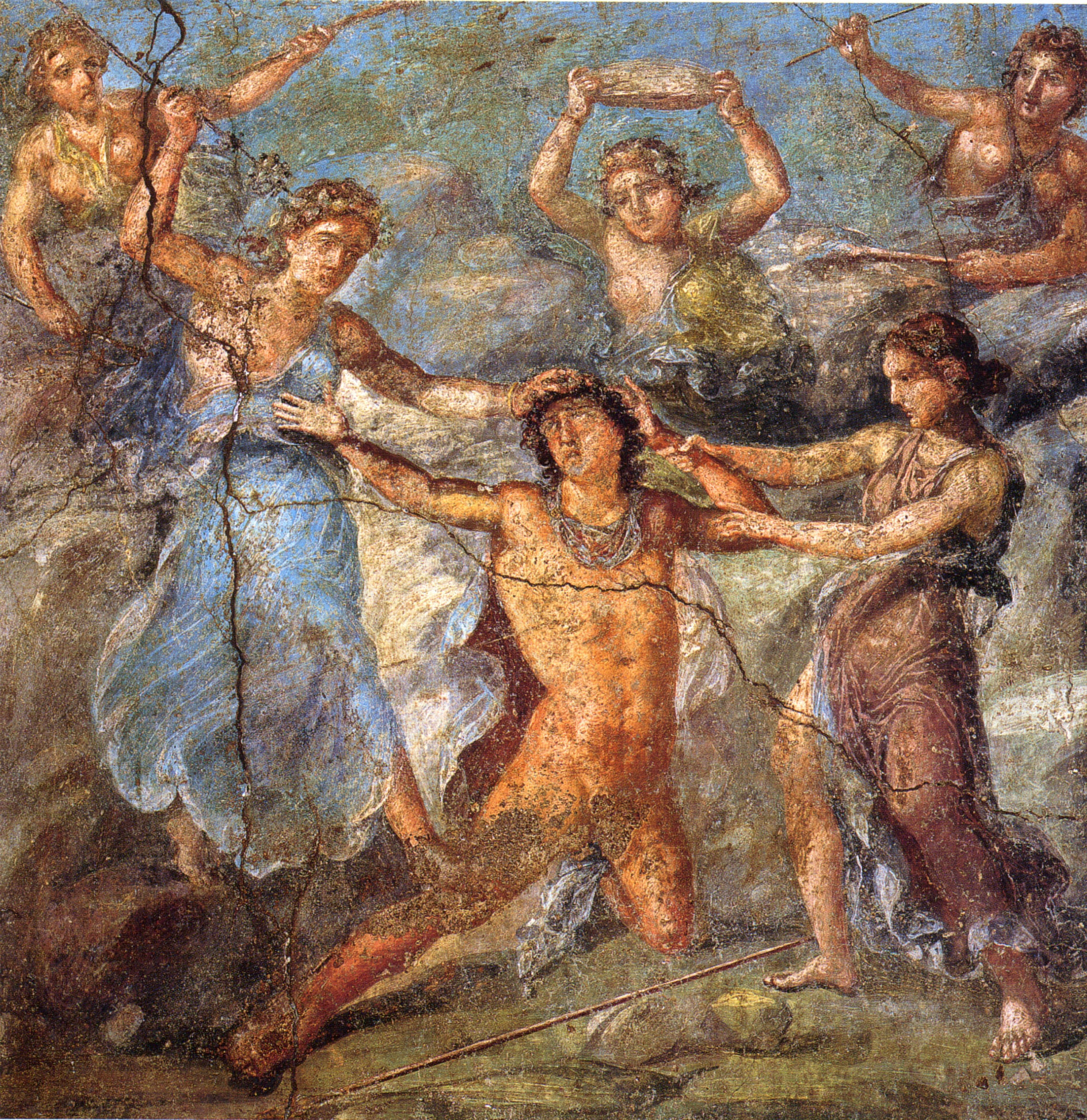
The Bacchae, ancient Greek tragedy by Euripides

Athenian tragedy—the oldest surviving form of tragedy—is a type of dance-drama that formed an important part of the theatrical culture of the city-state. Having emerged sometime during the 6th century BCE, it flowered during the 5th century BCE (from the end of which it began to spread throughout the Greek world), and continued to be popular until the beginning of the Hellenistic period. No tragedies from the 6th century and only 32 of the more than a thousand that were performed in the 5th century have survived. (Note: We have seven by Aeschylus, seven by Sophocles, and eighteen by Euripides. In addition, we also have the Cyclops, a satyr play by Euripides. Some critics since the 17th century have argued that one of the tragedies that the classical tradition gives as Euripides'—Rhesus—is a 4th-century play by an unknown author; modern scholarship agrees with the classical authorities and ascribes the play to Euripides. This uncertainty accounts for Brockett and Hildy's figure of 31 tragedies.) We have complete texts extant by Aeschylus, Sophocles, and Euripides. (Note: The theory that Prometheus Bound was not written by Aeschylus adds a fourth, anonymous playwright to those whose work survives.) Aeschylus' The Persians is recognized to be the earliest extant Greek tragedy, and as such it is doubly unique among the extant ancient dramas.

Athenian tragedies were performed in late March/early April at an annual state religious festival in honor of Dionysus. The presentations took the form of a contest between three playwrights, who presented their works on three successive days. Each playwright offered a tetralogy consisting of three tragedies and a concluding comic piece called a satyr play. The four plays sometimes featured linked stories. Only one complete trilogy of tragedies has survived, the Oresteia of Aeschylus. The Greek theatre was in the open air, on the side of a hill, and performances of a trilogy and satyr play probably lasted most of the day. Performances were apparently open to all citizens, including women, but evidence is scant. The theatre of Dionysus at Athens probably held around 12,000 people.

All of the choral parts were sung (to the accompaniment of an aulos) and some of the actors' answers to the chorus were sung as well. The play as a whole was composed in various verse metres. All actors were male and wore masks. A Greek chorus danced as well as sang, though no one knows exactly what sorts of steps the chorus performed as it sang. Choral songs in tragedy are often divided into three sections: strophe ("turning, circling"), antistrophe ("counter-turning, counter-circling") and epode ("after-song").

Many ancient Greek tragedians employed the ekkyklêma as a theatrical device, which was a platform hidden behind the scene that could be rolled out to display the aftermath of some event which had happened out of sight of the audience. This event was frequently a brutal murder of some sort, an act of violence which could not be effectively portrayed visually, but an action of which the other characters must see the effects for it to have meaning and emotional resonance. A prime example of the use of the ekkyklêma is after the murder of Agamemnon in the first play of Aeschylus' Oresteia, when the king's butchered body is wheeled out in a grand display for all to see. Variations on the ekkyklêma are used in tragedies and other forms to this day, as writers still find it a useful and often powerful device for showing the consequences of extreme human actions. Another such device was a crane, the mechane, which served to hoist a god or goddess on stage when they were supposed to arrive flying. This device gave origin to the phrase "deus ex machina" ("god out of a machine"), that is, the surprise intervention of an unforeseen external factor that changes the outcome of an event.

== Roman ==
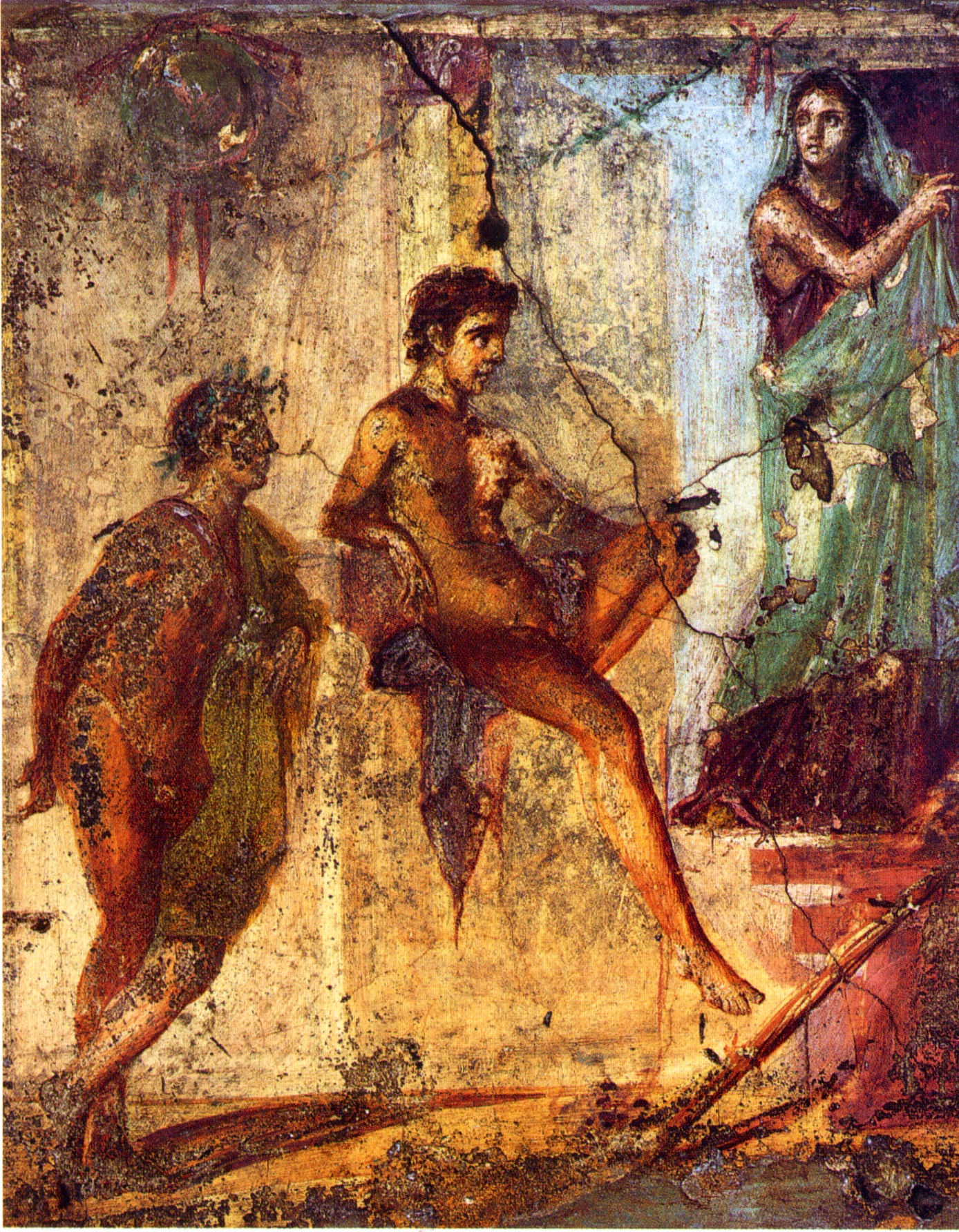
Scene from the tragedy Iphigenia in Tauris by Euripides. Roman fresco in Pompeii.

Following the expansion of the Roman Republic (509–27 BCE) into several Greek territories between 270 and 240 BCE, Rome encountered Greek tragedy. From the later years of the republic and by means of the Roman Empire (27 BCE-476 CE), theatre spread west across Europe, around the Mediterranean and even reached Britain. While Greek tragedy continued to be performed throughout the Roman period, the year 240 BCE marks the beginning of regular Roman drama. (Note: For more information on the ancient Roman dramatists, see the articles categorised under "Ancient Roman dramatists and playwrights" in Wikipedia.) Livius Andronicus began to write Roman tragedies, thus creating some of the first important works of Roman literature. Five years later, Gnaeus Naevius also began to write tragedies (though he was more appreciated for his comedies). No complete early Roman tragedy survives, though it was highly regarded in its day; historians know of three other early tragic playwrights—Quintus Ennius, Marcus Pacuvius and Lucius Accius.

From the time of the empire, the tragedies of two playwrights survive—one is an unknown author, while the other is the Stoic philosopher Seneca. Nine of Seneca's tragedies survive, all of which are fabula crepidata (tragedies adapted from Greek originals); his Phaedra, for example, was based on Euripides' Hippolytus. Historians do not know who wrote the only extant example of the fabula praetexta (tragedies based on Roman subjects), Octavia, but in former times it was mistakenly attributed to Seneca due to his appearance as a character in the tragedy.

Seneca's tragedies rework those of all three of the Athenian tragic playwrights whose work has survived. Probably meant to be recited at elite gatherings, they differ from the Greek versions with their long declamatory, narrative accounts of action, their obtrusive moralizing, and their bombastic rhetoric. They dwell on detailed accounts of horrible deeds and contain long reflective soliloquies. Though the gods rarely appear in these plays, ghosts and witches are abound. Senecan tragedies explore ideas of revenge, the occult, the supernatural, suicide, blood and gore. The Renaissance scholar Julius Caesar Scaliger (1484–1558), who knew both Latin and Greek, preferred Seneca to Euripides.

== Renaissance ==
=== Influence of Greek and Roman ===
Classical Greek drama was largely forgotten in Western Europe from the Middle Ages to the beginning of the 16th century. Medieval theatre was dominated by mystery plays, morality plays, farces and miracle plays. In Italy, the models for tragedy in the later Middle Ages were Roman, particularly the works of Seneca, interest in which was reawakened by the Paduan Lovato de' Lovati (1241–1309). His pupil Albertino Mussato (1261–1329), also of Padua, in 1315 wrote the Latin verse tragedy Eccerinis, which uses the story of the tyrant Ezzelino III da Romano to highlight the danger to Padua posed by Cangrande della Scala of Verona. It was the first secular tragedy written since Roman times, and may be considered the first Italian tragedy identifiable as a Renaissance work. The earliest tragedies to employ purely classical themes are the Achilles written before 1390 by Antonio Loschi of Vicenza (c.1365–1441) and the Progne of the Venetian Gregorio Correr (1409–1464) which dates from 1428 to 1429.

In 1515 Gian Giorgio Trissino (1478–1550) of Vicenza wrote his tragedy Sophonisba in the vernacular that would later be called Italian. Drawn from Livy's account of Sophonisba, the Carthaginian princess who drank poison to avoid being taken by the Romans, it adheres closely to classical rules. It was soon followed by the Oreste and Rosmunda of Trissino's friend, the Florentine Giovanni di Bernardo Rucellai (1475–1525). Both were completed by early 1516 and are based on classical Greek models, Rosmunda on the Hecuba of Euripides, and Oreste on the Iphigenia in Tauris of the same author; like Sophonisba, they are in Italian and in blank (unrhymed) hendecasyllables. Another of the first of all modern tragedies is A Castro, by Portuguese poet and playwright António Ferreira, written around 1550 (but only published in 1587) in polymetric verse (most of it being blank hendecasyllables), dealing with the murder of Inês de Castro, one of the most dramatic episodes in Portuguese history. Although these three Italian plays are often cited, separately or together, as being the first regular tragedies in modern times, as well as the earliest substantial works to be written in blank hendecasyllables, they were apparently preceded by two other works in the vernacular: Pamfila or Filostrato e Panfila written in 1498 or 1508 by Antonio Cammelli (Antonio da Pistoia); and a Sophonisba by Galeotto del Carretto of 1502.

From about 1500 printed copies, in the original languages, of the works of Sophocles, Seneca, and Euripides, as well as comedic writers such as Aristophanes, Terence and Plautus, were available in Europe and the next forty years saw humanists and poets translating and adapting their tragedies. In the 1540s, the European university setting (and especially, from 1553 on, the Jesuit colleges) became host to a Neo-Latin theatre (in Latin) written by scholars. The influence of Seneca was particularly strong in its humanist tragedy. His plays, with their ghosts, lyrical passages and rhetorical oratory, brought a concentration on rhetoric and language over dramatic action to many humanist tragedies.

The most important sources for French tragic theatre in the Renaissance were the example of Seneca and the precepts of Horace and Aristotle (and contemporary commentaries by Julius Caesar Scaliger and Lodovico Castelvetro), although plots were taken from classical authors such as Plutarch, Suetonius, etc., from the Bible, from contemporary events and from short story collections (Italian, French and Spanish). The Greek tragic authors (Sophocles and Euripides) would become increasingly important as models by the middle of the 17th century. Important models were also supplied by the Spanish Golden Age playwrights Pedro Calderón de la Barca, Tirso de Molina and Lope de Vega, many of whose works were translated and adapted for the French stage.

=== Britain ===
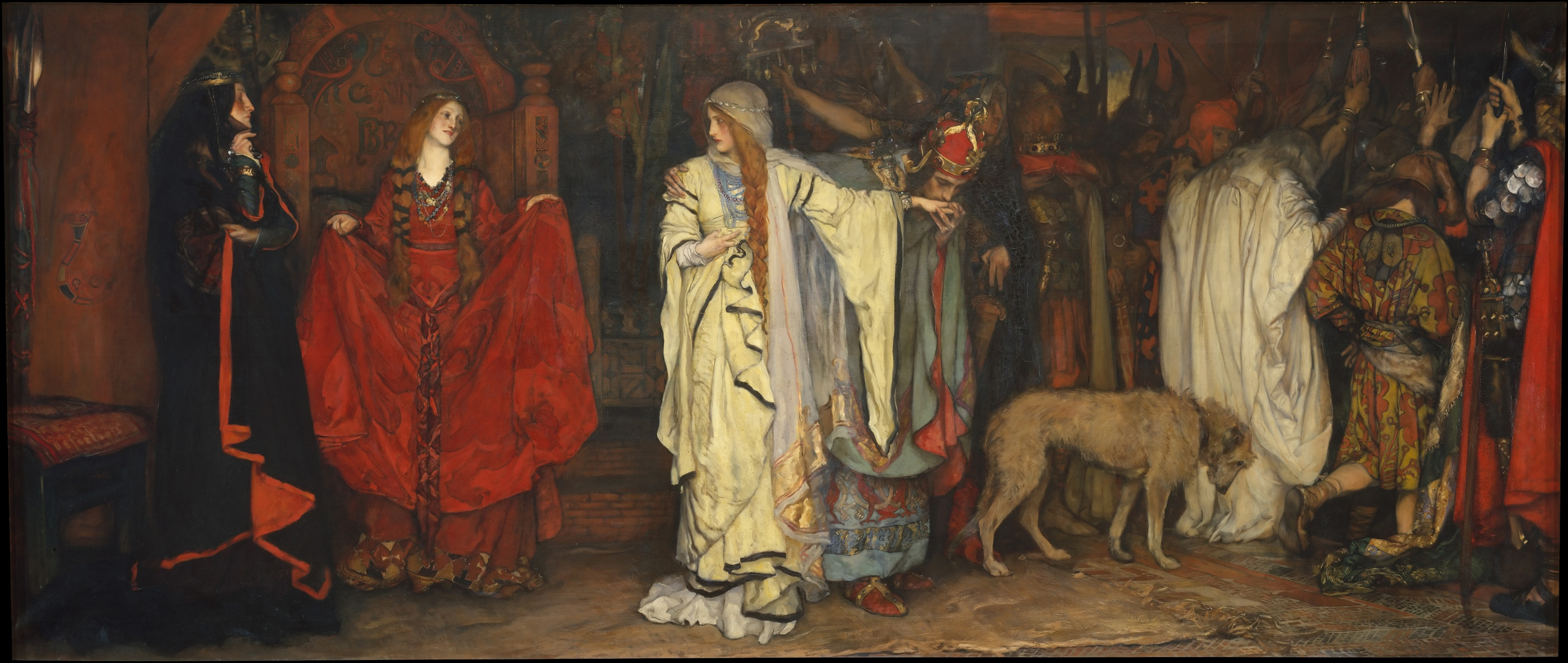
Edwin Austin Abbey (1852–1911) King Lear, Cordelia's Farewell

British tragedy, particularly in the Elizabethan and Jacobean periods, diverged from classical models in both form and theme. While influenced by Senecan drama, British tragedies frequently defied the unities of time, place, and action, favoring a more flexible dramatic structure. This allowed for a deeper exploration of psychological complexity, political instability, and moral ambiguity. Rather than adhering to neoclassical ideals, British tragedies frequently blended high and low characters and adopted tragicomic tones, contributing to the development of a distinct national tradition. The chaotic structure and social hybridity of many of these plays mirrored the turbulent political and religious transformations of the time.

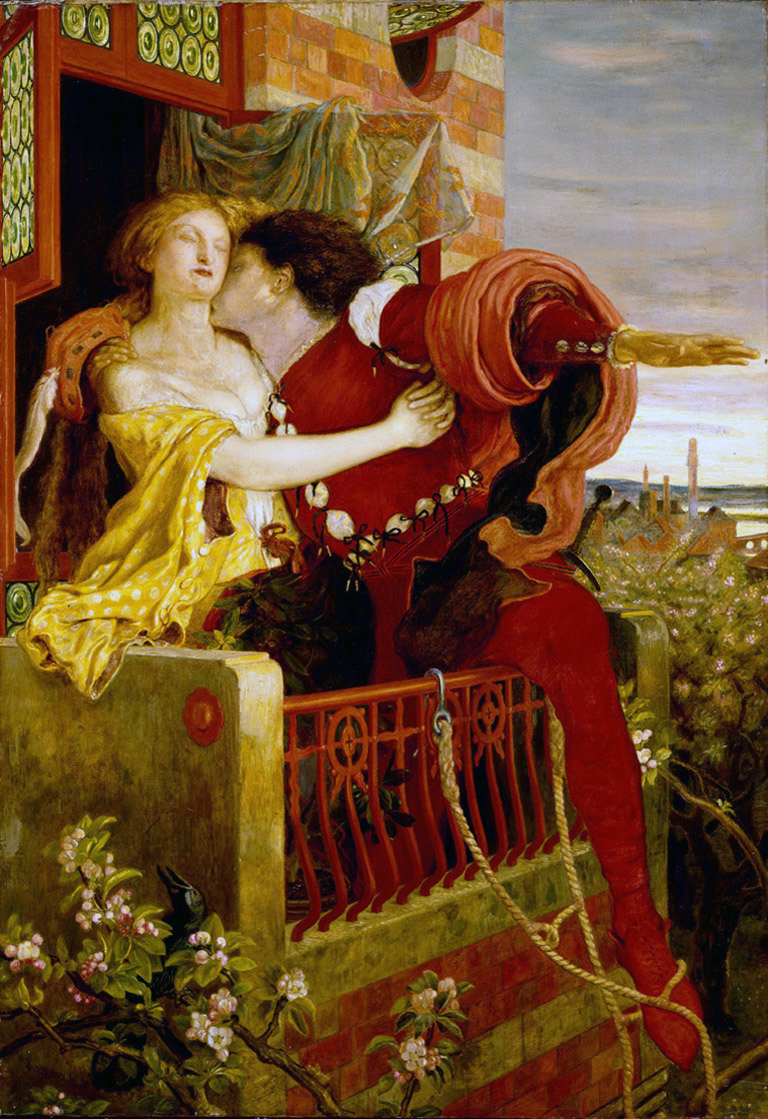
Romeo and Juliet, the classic tragedy by English playwright William Shakespeare

The common forms are the:

- Tragedy of circumstance: people are born into their situations, and do not choose them; such tragedies explore the consequences of birthrights, particularly but not always for monarchs. (This particular variant of tragedy was the genre's first shift away from stories about characters suffering due to their own faults, but rather due to circumstances out of their control.)
- Tragedy of miscalculation: the protagonist's error of judgement has tragic consequences
- Revenge play

In English, the most famous and most successful tragedies are those of William Shakespeare and his Elizabethan contemporaries. Shakespeare's tragedies include:

- Antony and Cleopatra
- Coriolanus
- Hamlet
- Julius Caesar
- King Lear
- Macbeth
- Othello
- Romeo and Juliet
- Timon of Athens
- Titus Andronicus
- Troilus and Cressida

William Shakespeare expanded the tragedy genre further by integrating elements of comedy, history, and philosophy into his tragedies. His works such as King Lear, Hamlet, and Macbeth are noted for their interiority use of soliloquy, and exploration of fate, madness and human agency.

A contemporary of Shakespeare, Christopher Marlowe, also wrote examples of tragedy in English, notably:

- The Tragical History of Doctor Faustus
- Tamburlaine the Great

Christopher Marlowe's Doctor Faustus merges medieval morality traditions with Renaissance humanism, portraying a tragic protagonist who seeks knowledge and power at the expense of salvation.

John Webster (1580?–1635?), also wrote famous plays of the genre:

- The Duchess of Malfi
- The White Devil

=== Domestic tragedy ===
Domestic tragedies are tragedies in which the tragic protagonists are ordinary middle-class or working-class individuals. This subgenre contrasts with classical and Neoclassical tragedy, in which the protagonists are of kingly or aristocratic rank and their downfall is an affair of state as well as a personal matter.

The Ancient Greek theorist Aristotle had argued that tragedy should concern only great individuals with great minds and souls, because their catastrophic downfall would be more emotionally powerful to the audience; only comedy should depict middle-class people. Domestic tragedy breaks with Aristotle's precepts, taking as its subjects merchants or citizens whose lives have less consequence in the wider world.

The advent of the domestic tragedy ushered in the first phase shift of the genre focusing less on the Aristotelian definition of the genre and more on the definition of tragedy on the scale of the drama, where tragedy is opposed to comedy i.e. melancholic stories. Although the utilization of key elements such as suffering, hamartia, morality, and spectacle ultimately ties this variety of tragedy to all the rest. This variant of tragedy noticeably had a larger number of stories that featured characters' downfalls being due to circumstances out of their control - a feature first established by the tragedies of Shakespeare - and less due to their own personal flaws.

This variant of tragedy has led to the evolution and development of tragedies of the modern era especially those past the mid-1800s such as the works of Arthur Miller, Eugene O'Neill and Henrik Ibsen. This variant of tragedy is especially popular in the modern age due to its characters being more relatable to mass audiences and is the most common form of tragedy adapted into modern day television programs, books, films, theatrical plays, etc. Newly dealt with themes that sprang forth from the Domestic tragedy movement include: wrongful convictions and executions, poverty, starvation, addiction, alcoholism, debt, structural abuse, child abuse, crime, domestic violence, social shunning, depression, and loneliness.

Classical Domestic tragedies include:

- Arden of Faversham (1592)
- A Woman Killed with Kindness (1607)
- A Yorkshire Tragedy (1608)
- The Witch of Edmonton (1621)

=== Opera ===
Contemporary with Shakespeare, an entirely different approach to facilitating the rebirth of tragedy was taken in Italy. Jacopo Peri, in the preface to his Euridice refers to "the ancient Greeks and Romans (who in the opinion of many sang their staged tragedies throughout in representing them on stage)." The attempts of Peri and his contemporaries to recreate ancient tragedy gave rise to the new Italian musical genre of opera. In France, tragic operatic works from the time of Lully to about that of Gluck were not called opera, but tragédie en musique ("tragedy in music") or some similar name; the tragédie en musique is regarded as a distinct musical genre. Some later operatic composers have also shared Peri's aims: Richard Wagner's concept of Gesamtkunstwerk ("integrated work of art"), for example, was intended as a return to the ideal of Greek tragedy in which all the arts were blended in service of the drama. Nietzsche, in his The Birth of Tragedy (1872) was to support Wagner in his claims to be a successor of the ancient dramatists.

== Neo-classical ==
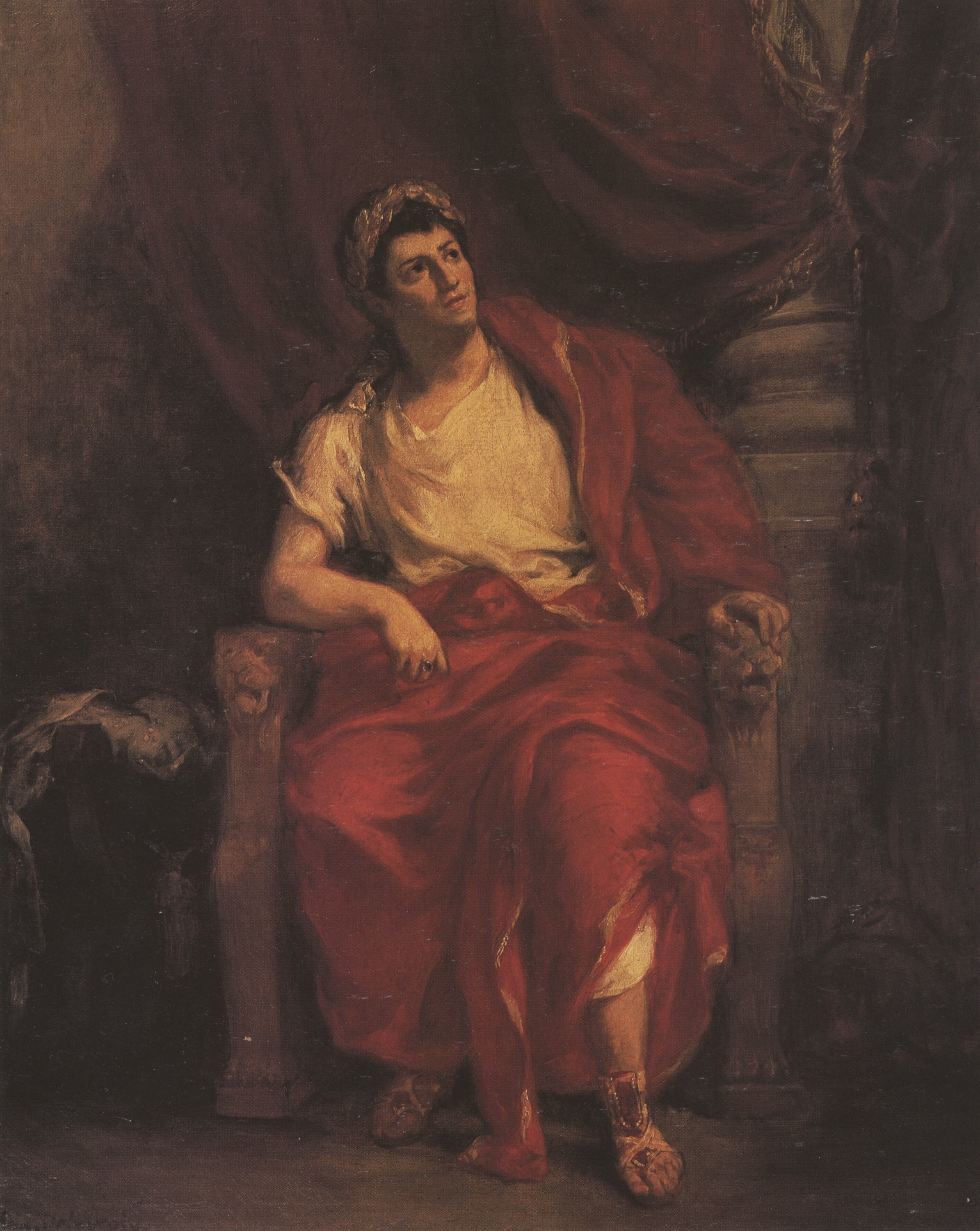
French actor Talma as Nero in Racine's Britannicus.

For much of the 17th century, Pierre Corneille, who made his mark on the world of tragedy with plays like Médée (1635) and Le Cid (1636), was the most successful writer of French tragedies. Corneille's tragedies were strangely un-tragic (his first version of Le Cid was even listed as a tragicomedy), for they had happy endings. In his theoretical works on theatre, Corneille redefined both comedy and tragedy around the following suppositions:

- The stage—in both comedy and tragedy—should feature noble characters (this would eliminate many low-characters, typical of the farce, from Corneille's comedies). Noble characters should not be depicted as vile (reprehensible actions are generally due to non-noble characters in Corneille's plays).
- Tragedy deals with affairs of the state (wars, dynastic marriages); comedy deals with love. For a work to be tragic, it need not have a tragic ending.
- Although Aristotle says that catharsis (purgation of emotion) should be the goal of tragedy, this is only an ideal. In conformity with the moral codes of the period, plays should not show evil being rewarded or nobility being degraded.

Corneille continued to write plays through 1674 (mainly tragedies, but also something he called "heroic comedies") and many continued to be successes, although the "irregularities" of his theatrical methods were increasingly criticised (notably by François Hédelin, abbé d'Aubignac) and the success of Jean Racine from the late 1660s signalled the end of his preeminence.

Jean Racine's tragedies—inspired by Greek myths, Euripides, Sophocles and Seneca—condensed their plot into a tight set of passionate and duty-bound conflicts between a small group of noble characters, and concentrated on these characters' double-binds and the geometry of their unfulfilled desires and hatreds. Racine's poetic skill was in the representation of pathos and amorous passion (like Phèdre's love for her stepson) and his impact was such that emotional crisis would be the dominant mode of tragedy to the end of the century. Racine's two late plays ("Esther" and "Athalie") opened new doors to biblical subject matter and to the use of theatre in the education of young women. Racine also faced criticism for his irregularities: when his play, Bérénice, was criticised for not containing any deaths, Racine disputed the conventional view of tragedy.

For more on French tragedy of the 16th and 17th centuries, see French Renaissance literature and French literature of the 17th century.

=== Later development ===
Towards the close of the eighteenth century, having studied her predecessors, Joanna Baillie wanted to revolutionise theatre, believing that it could be used more effectively to affect people's lives. To this end she gave a new direction to tragedy, which she defined as 'the unveiling of the human mind under the dominion of those strong and fixed passions, which seemingly unprovoked by outward circumstances, will from small beginnings brood within the breast, till all the better dispositions, all the fair gifts of nature are borne down before them'. This theory, she put into practice in her 'Series of Plays on the Passions' in three volumes (commencing in 1798) and in other dramatic works. Her method was to create a series of scenes and incidents intended to capture the audience's inquisitiveness and 'trace the progress of the passion, pointing out those stages in the approach of the enemy, when he might have been combated most successfully; and where the suffering him to pass may be considered as occasioning all the misery that ensues.'

== Bourgeois ==
Bourgeois tragedy, known in German as Bürgerliches Trauerspiel, emerged in 18th-century Europe as a product of the Enlightenment and the rise of the bourgeoise. This genre of tragedy is distinguished by its focus on ordinary citizens as protagonists, deviating from the classical emphasis on nobility. The first true bourgeois tragedy was English playwright, George Lillo's 1731 play, The London Merchant; or, the History of George Barnwell. Gotthold Ephraim Lessing's play Miss Sara Sampson, which was first produced in 1755, is said to be the earliest Bürgerliches Trauerspiel in Germany.

== Modern development ==
In modernist literature, the definition of tragedy has become less precise. The most fundamental change has been the rejection of Aristotle's dictum that true tragedy can only depict those with power and high status. Arthur Miller's essay "Tragedy and the Common Man" (1949) argues that tragedy may also depict ordinary people in domestic surroundings thus defining Domestic tragedies. British playwright Howard Barker has argued strenuously for the rebirth of tragedy in the contemporary theatre, most notably in his volume Arguments for a Theatre. "You emerge from tragedy equipped against lies. After the musical, you're anybody's fool," he insists.

Critics such as George Steiner have even been prepared to argue that tragedy may no longer exist in comparison with its former manifestations in classical antiquity. In The Death of Tragedy (1961), Steiner outlined the characteristics of Greek tragedy and the traditions that developed from that period. In the Foreword (1980) to a new edition of his book Steiner concluded that 'the dramas of Shakespeare are not a renascence of or a humanistic variant of the absolute tragic model. They are, rather, a rejection of this model in the light of tragi-comic and "realistic" criteria.' In part, this feature of Shakespeare's mind is explained by his bent of mind or imagination which was 'so encompassing, so receptive to the plurality of diverse orders of experience.' When compared to the drama of Greek antiquity and French classicism Shakespeare's forms are 'richer but hybrid'.

Numerous books and plays continue to be written in the tradition of tragedy to this day examples include Froth on the Daydream, The Road, The Fault in Our Stars, Sophie's Choice, Fat City, Rabbit Hole, Requiem for a Dream, and The Handmaid's Tale.

== Theories ==
Defining tragedy is no simple matter, and there are many definitions, some of which are incompatible with each other. Oscar Mandel, in A Definition of Tragedy (1961), contrasted two essentially different means of arriving at a definition. First is what he calls the derivative way, in which the tragedy is thought to be an expression of an ordering of the world; "instead of asking what tragedy expresses, the derivative definition tends to ask what expresses itself through tragedy". The second is the substantive way of defining tragedy, which starts with the work of art which is assumed to contain the ordering of the world. Substantive critics "are interested in the constituent elements of art, rather than its ontological sources". He recognizes four subclasses: a. "definition by formal elements" (for instance the supposed "three unities"); b. "definition by situation" (where one defines tragedy for instance as "exhibiting the fall of a good man"); c. "definition by ethical direction" (where the critic is concerned with the meaning, with the "intellectual and moral effect); and d. "definition by emotional effect" (and he cites Aristotle's "requirement of pity and fear").

=== Aristotle ===
Aristotle wrote in his work Poetics that tragedy is characterised by seriousness and involves a great person who experiences a reversal of fortune (Peripeteia). Aristotle's definition can include a change of fortune from bad to good as in the Eumenides and the Iphigenia in Tauris, but he says that the change from good to bad as in Oedipus Rex is preferable because this induces pity and fear within the spectators. Elsewhere, however, he ranks the plot of Iphigenia as the best and that of Oedipus as the second-best, seemingly contradicting himself. Tragedy results in a catharsis (emotional cleansing) or healing for the audience through their experience of these emotions in response to the suffering of the characters in the drama.

According to Aristotle, "the structure of the best tragedy should not be simple but complex and one that represents incidents arousing fear and pity—for that is peculiar to this form of art." This reversal of fortune must be caused by the tragic hero's hamartia, which is often translated as either a character flaw, or as a mistake (since the original Greek etymology traces back to hamartanein, a sporting term that refers to an archer or spear-thrower missing his target). According to Aristotle, "The misfortune is brought about not by [general] vice or depravity, but by some [particular] error or frailty." The reversal is the inevitable but unforeseen result of some action taken by the hero. It is also a misconception that this reversal can be brought about by a higher power (e.g. the law, the gods, fate, or society), but if a character's downfall is brought about by an external cause, Aristotle describes this as a misadventure and not a tragedy.

In addition, the tragic hero may achieve some revelation or recognition (anagnorisis—"knowing again" or "knowing back" or "knowing throughout") about human fate, destiny, and the will of the gods. Aristotle terms this sort of recognition "a change from ignorance to awareness of a bond of love or hate."

In Poetics, Aristotle gave the following definition in ancient Greek of the word "tragedy" (τραγῳδία):

Tragedy is an imitation of an action that is admirable, complete (composed of an introduction, a middle part and an ending), and possesses magnitude; in language made pleasurable, each of its species separated in different parts; performed by actors, not through narration; effecting through pity and fear the purification of such emotions.

Common usage of tragedy refers to any story with a sad ending, whereas to be an Aristotelian tragedy the story must fit the set of requirements as laid out by Poetics. By this definition social drama cannot be tragic because the hero in it is a victim of circumstance and incidents that depend upon the society in which he lives and not upon the inner compulsions—psychological or religious—which determine his progress towards self-knowledge and death. Exactly what constitutes a "tragedy", however, is a frequently debated matter.

According to Aristotle, there are four species of tragedy:

1. Complex, which involves Peripety and Discovery
2. Suffering, tragedies of such nature can be seen in the Greek mythological stories of Ajaxes and Ixions
3. Character, a tragedy of moral or ethical character. Tragedies of this nature can be found in Phthiotides and Peleus
4. Spectacle, that of a horror-like theme. Examples of this nature are Phorcides and Prometheus

=== Hegel ===
G.W.F. Hegel, the German philosopher most famous for his dialectical approach to epistemology and history, also applied such a methodology to his theory of tragedy. In his essay "Hegel's Theory of Tragedy," A.C. Bradley first introduced the English-speaking world to Hegel's theory, which Bradley called the "tragic collision", and contrasted against the Aristotelian notions of the "tragic hero" and his or her "hamartia" in subsequent analyses of the Aeschylus' Oresteia trilogy and of Sophocles' Antigone. Hegel himself, however, in his seminal "The Phenomenology of Spirit" argues for a more complicated theory of tragedy, with two complementary branches which, though driven by a single dialectical principle, differentiate Greek tragedy from that which follows Shakespeare. His later lectures formulate such a theory of tragedy as a conflict of ethical forces, represented by characters, in ancient Greek tragedy, but in Shakespearean tragedy the conflict is rendered as one of subject and object, of individual personality which must manifest self-destructive passions because only such passions are strong enough to defend the individual from a hostile and capricious external world:

The heroes of ancient classical tragedy encounter situations in which, if they firmly decide in favor of the one ethical pathos that alone suits their finished character, they must necessarily come into conflict with the equally [gleichberechtigt] justified ethical power that confronts them. Modern characters, on the other hand, stand in a wealth of more accidental circumstances, within which one could act this way or that, so that the conflict is, though occasioned by external preconditions, still essentially grounded in the character. The new individuals, in their passions, obey their own nature... simply because they are what they are. Greek heroes also act in accordance with individuality, but in ancient tragedy such individuality is necessarily... a self-contained ethical pathos... In modern tragedy, however, the character in its peculiarity decides in accordance with subjective desires... such that congruity of character with outward ethical aim no longer constitutes an essential basis of tragic beauty...

Hegel's comments on a particular play may better elucidate his theory: "Viewed externally, Hamlet's death may be seen to have been brought about accidentally... but in Hamlet's soul, we understand that death has lurked from the beginning: the sandbank of finitude cannot suffice his sorrow and tenderness, such grief and nausea at all conditions of life... we feel he is a man whom inner disgust has almost consumed well before death comes upon him from outside."

== See also ==
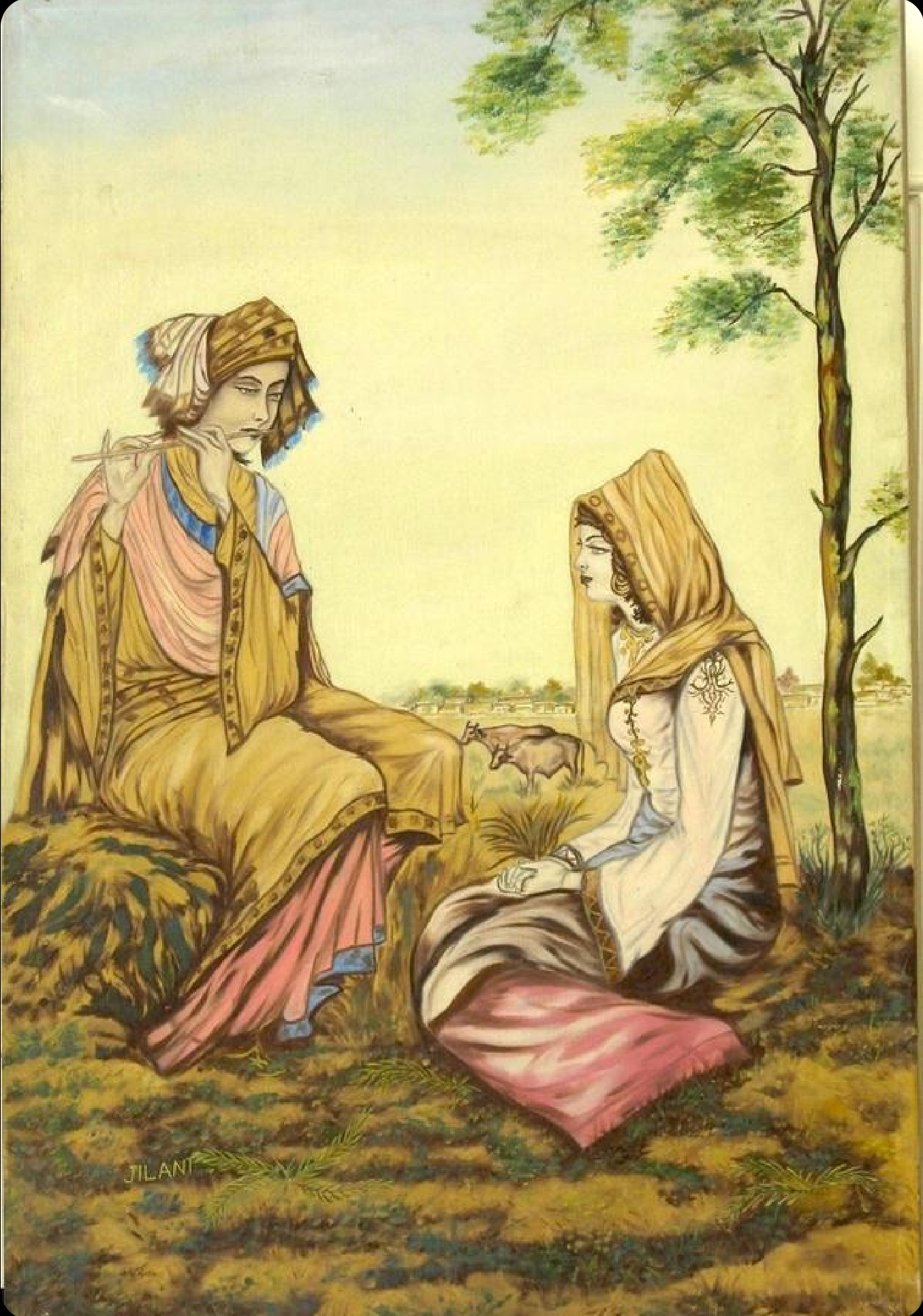
The classical Punjabi tragedy of Heer Ranjha, one of the four classic tragedies of Punjabi folklore; the tragedy's epic form by Waris Shah is regarded as one of the greatest pieces of Punjabi literature

- Classicism
- Tragédies en musique
- She-tragedy
- Revenge tragedy

== Sources ==
- Aristotle (1932). "Poetics". Aristotle in 23 Volumes. Vol. 23. Translated by Fyfe, W.H. Cambridge, MA: Harvard University Press. Archived from the original on 8 November 2013.
- ——— (1974). "Poetics". In Dukore (ed.). Dramatic Theory and Criticism: Greeks to Grotowski. Translated by Butcher, SH. pp. 31–55.
- ——— (1987). Poetics with Tractatus Coislinianus, Reconstruction of Poetics II and the Fragments of the On Poets. Translated by Janko, Richard. Cambridge: Hackett. ISBN 0-87220-033-7.
- Baillie, Joanna (1798). A Series of Plays in which it is attempted to delineate The Stranger Passions of the Mind, Volume 1: Introductory Discourse. London.
- Banham, Martin, ed. (1998). The Cambridge Guide to Theatre. Cambridge: Cambridge UP. ISBN 0-521-43437-8.
- Barker, Howard (1989). Arguments for a Theatre (3rd ed.). London: John Calder (published 1997). ISBN 0-7190-5249-1.
- Benjamin, Walter (1998) [1928]. The Origin of German Tragic Drama. Osborne, John trans. London and New York: Verso. ISBN 1-85984-899-0.
- Bradley, AC (2007) [1909]. Oxford Lectures on Poetry (repr ed.). Atlantic. ISBN 978-81-7156-379-1.
- Brockett, Oscar Gross; Hildy, Franklin Joseph (2003). History of the theatre (9th, ill ed.). Allyn & Bacon. ISBN 978-0-205-35878-6.
- Carlson, Marvin (1993). Theories of the Theatre: A Historical and Critical Survey from the Greeks to the Present (expanded ed.). Ithaca and London: Cornell UP. ISBN 0-8014-8154-6.
- Colón, Christine (2007). Introduction. Six Gothic Dramas. By Baillie, Joanna. Chicago: Valancourd Books. ISBN 978-0-9792332-0-3.
- Dukore, ed. (1974). Dramatic Theory and Criticism: Greeks to Grotowski.
- Felski, Rita, ed. (2008). Rethinking Tragedy. Baltimore: Johns Hopkins UP. ISBN 978-0-8018-8740-6.
- Goldhill, Simon (2 October 1997). "The audience of Athenian tragedy". In Easterling, P. E. (ed.). The Cambridge Companion to Greek Tragedy (1 ed.). Cambridge University Press. pp. 54–68. doi:10.1017/ccol0521412455.003. ISBN 978-0-521-41245-2.
- Headington, Christopher; Westbrook, Roy; Barfoot, Terry (1991). Opera: a History. Arrow. p. 22.
- Hegel, GWF (1927). "Vorlesungen uber die Asthetik". In Glockner, Hermann (ed.). Samlichte Werke. Vol. 14. Stuttgart: Fromann.
- Kovacs, David (2005). "Text and Transmission". In Gregory, Justina (ed.). A companion to Greek tragedy. Malden, MA: Blackwell Pub. ISBN 1-4051-0770-7. OCLC 56834832.
- Ley, Graham (2007). A Short Introduction to the Ancient Greek Theater (rev ed.). University of Chicago Press. ISBN 978-0-226-47761-9.
- Lucas, FL (1954). Greek Drama for Everyman. London: JM Dent & Sons.
- Miller, Arthur (27 February 1949). "Tragedy and the Common Man". The New York Times (Dukore 1974, pp. 894–7).
- Nietzsche, Friedrich (1999) [1872]. Geuss, Raymond; Speirs, Ronald (eds.). The Birth of Tragedy and Other Writings. Cambridge Texts in the History of Philosophy. Speirs, Ronald trans. Cambridge: Cambridge UP. ISBN 0-521-63987-5.
- Pfister, Manfred (1988) [1977]. The Theory and Analysis of Drama. European Studies in English Literature. Halliday, John trans. Cambridge: Cambridge UP. ISBN 0-521-42383-X.
- Rehm, Rush (1992). Greek Tragic Theatre. Theatre Production Studies. London and New York: Routledge. ISBN 0-415-11894-8.
- Schlegel, August Wilhelm (1809). Lectures on Dramatic Art and Literature. Gutenberg. Archived from the original on 2 October 2020.
- Sorkin, Nancy (2008). Greek Tragedy. Introductions to the Classical World. Malden, MA: Blackwell. ISBN 978-1-4051-2161-3.
- Styan, J. L. (2000). Drama : a guide to the study of plays. New York: Peter Lang. ISBN 0-8204-4489-8. OCLC 40856937.
- Takeda, Arata (2025). Die verkannte Tragödie: Theoriebildung und Wissenswandel zwischen Antike und Neuzeit. Weilerswist: Velbrück. ISBN 978-3-95832-386-5.
- Taxidou, Olga (2004). Tragedy, Modernity and Mourning. Edinburgh: Edinburgh UP. ISBN 0-7486-1987-9.
- Williams, Raymond (1966). Modern Tragedy. London: Chatto & Windus. ISBN 0-7011-1260-3.
