= Robert Denig =

Robert Denig may refer to:

- Robert L. Denig (1884–1979), United States Marine Corps general
- Robert S. Denig (1946–1995), bishop of the Episcopal Diocese of Western Massachusetts
