= Andy Laurie =

Australian rugby player (1931–1979)

- Full name: Andrew Alexander Laurie
- Born: 20 August 1931 Walcha, NSW, Australia
- Died: 12 July 1979 (aged 47)

Rugby union career
- Position: Hooker
Provincial / State sides
Years	Team	Apps	(Points)
- New South Wales
International career
Years	Team	Apps	(Points)
1962, 1964	Australia		

Andrew Alexander Laurie (20 August 1931 – 12 July 1979) was an Australian international rugby union player.

Laurie was born in the Northern Tablelands town of Walcha and picked up rugby union while attending Mosman Preparatory School. He completed his schooling at Sydney Church of England Grammar School and played for their first XV. Afterwards, Laurie returned to Walcha, where he was utilised as a flanker initially.

Impressing early on in his appearances for Walcha, Laurie was quick to make his representative debut with New England, forming a back row with club teammate and future Wallaby Peter Fenwicke. He switched to hooker in 1959 and earned NSW Country representative honours during his second season in this new role, with his appearances including a match against the touring All Blacks. His Wallabies career encompassed two tours of New Zealand, in 1962 and 1964, both times as an understudy to hooker Peter Johnson, which restricted him to the non international fixtures.

Laurie remained involved with the Walcha rugby club after retiring. He coached Walcha to the 1971 Central North premiership and served 28 year on the committee, which included a six year stint as secretary.

== See also ==
- List of Australia national rugby union players
