= Waldron Lavers =

Canadian politician

MLA (Councillor) for 5th Kings
- In office 1974–1978
- Preceded by: George J. Ferguson
- Succeeded by: Lowell Johnston

Personal details
- Born: February 1, 1911 Georgetown, Prince Edward Island
- Died: July 4, 1979 (aged 68) Charlottetown, Prince Edward Island
- Party: Liberal

James Waldron Lavers (February 1, 1911 – July 4, 1979) was a Canadian politician and judicial clerk. He represented 5th Kings in the Legislative Assembly of Prince Edward Island from 1974 to 1978 as a Liberal.

Waldron was born in 1911 in Georgetown, Prince Edward Island. He married Lillian Blanche Walker in 1936. From 1947 to 1974, Lavers worked as a judicial clerk. He also served on Georgetown Town Council, and was deputy mayor.

Lavers entered provincial politics in the 1974 election, defeating Progressive Conservative Lowell Johnston by 108 votes to become councillor for the electoral district of 5th Kings. Lavers was defeated by Johnston when he ran for re-election in 1978.

Lavers died in Charlottetown on July 4, 1979.
