= Harold Hunter Armstrong =

American author

- Born: April 9, 1884; Morenci, Michigan
- Died: July 11, 1979 (aged 95)
- Occupation: Writer

Harold Hunter Armstrong (April 9, 1884 in Morenci, Michigan– July 11, 1979) was an American writer. He also wrote under the name Henry G. Aikman.

== Bibliography ==
- The Groper (1919) (as Henry G. Aikman)
- Zell: A Novel (as Henry G. Aikman) (1921)
- For Richer, For Poorer (1922)
