= Gilbert Stead =

British radiologist (1888-1979)

Gilbert Stead (3 February 1888 – 5 July 1979) was a British professor of physics and pioneer in the development of radiology as a recognized medical specialty.

Stead worked at the Cavendish Laboratory and graduated from Cambridge in 1913. During WWI he was at HM Signals School in Portsmouth. After the war, he returned to Cavendish Laboratory and taught. Beginning in 1923 he also taught classes at Guy's Hospital where he brought his knowledge of radiology to the practice of medicine. He relinquished his Cambridge professorship in 1938 when he became a governor at Guy's Hospital. He retired from Guy's Hospital in 1953.

Stead wrote the text Elementary Physics, which, when it was published in 1924, was "hailed as a superb source of help to struggling radiology and medical students." This text was continuously in print, published in updated editions, for over 50 years. In 1939, he wrote the book Notes in Practical Physics which was widely used in British schools.

== Degrees, awards, honors ==
M.A., D.Sc. (Doctor of Science), Fellow of the Institute of Physics, Fellow of the Royal Society for the encouragement of Arts, Manufactures & Commerce, and Fellow of the Cambridge Philosophical Society, President of the British Institute of Radiology from 1947-1948, Chair of Physics at Guy's Hospital 1938-1953.

== Selected publications ==
- Stead, Gilbert (1924) Elementary Physics, and subsequent editions through 1975;
- Stead, Gilbert (1939) Notes in Practical Physics;
- Stead, Gilbert (1956) “Sixty Years of Radiology; Physics” British Journal of Radiology, 29 (342), 234-8;
