= Walter Christopherson =

New Zealand cricketer

Walter Christopherson (27 May 1898 – 14 July 1979) was a New Zealand cricketer who played for Wellington. He was born in Wellington and died in Mount Maunganui.

Christopherson made a single first-class appearance for the side, during the 1926–27 season, against Auckland. He scored 46 runs in the first innings in which he bowled, from the lower order, and 5 not out in the second.
