= Friedrich Knauer (chemist) =

German chemist (1897–1979)

Friedrich Wilhelm Karl Knauer (22 January 1897 – 7 July 1979) was a German physical chemist. During World War II, he worked on the German nuclear energy project, also known as the Uranium Club.

== Education ==
From 1918 to 1924, Knauer studied at the Georg-August-Universität Göttingen and Leibniz University Hannover. He received his doctorate in engineering in 1923 at Hannover; he was a student of Beckmann and W. Kohlrausch.

== Career ==
No later than 1933, he completed his Habilitation, and he became a Privatdozent at the Universität Hamburg. In 1939, he became an assistant in the department of physical chemistry and then a supernumerary professor (nichtplanmäßiger Professor) there.

During World War II, as yearly as 1940, he was a member of Paul Harteck's group at the University of Hamburg. He did research on neutron diffusion and capture in uranium for the German nuclear energy project, also known as the Uranverein.

== Internal Reports ==
The following report was published in Kernphysikalische Forschungsberichte (Research Reports in Nuclear Physics), an internal publication of the German Uranverein. The reports were classified Top Secret, they had very limited distribution, and the authors were not allowed to keep copies. The reports were confiscated under the Allied Operation Alsos and sent to the United States Atomic Energy Commission for evaluation. In 1971, the reports were declassified and returned to Germany. The reports are available at the Karlsruhe Nuclear Research Center and the American Institute of Physics.

- Paul Harteck, Johannes Jensen, Friedrich Knauer, and Hans Suess Über die Bremsung, die Diffusion und den Einfang von Neutronen in fester Kohlensäure und über Präparat 38 G-36 (19 August 1940)

== Bibliography ==
- Hentschel, Klaus (Editor) and Ann M. Hentschel (Editorial Assistant and Translator) Physics and National Socialism: An Anthology of Primary Sources (Birkhäuser, 1996)
- Walker, Mark German National Socialism and the Quest for Nuclear Power 1939–1949 (Cambridge, 1993) ISBN 0-521-43804-7
