= Sala gang =

Group of criminals originating in Sweden

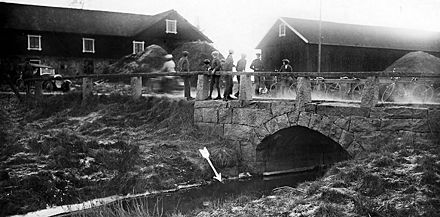
The Sala gangs first victim was the cab driver Sven Eriksson who was found in a stream at Sörbo bro, right outside the town of Sala.

The Sala gang (Swedish: Salaligan) was a group of five individuals originating from Sala, Sweden, that committed at least five murders and several thefts and burglaries from 1930 to 1936 in and around Sala. The gang's leader was Sigvard Thurneman (claims have been made that his assumed last name originated from the English word manhunter and he had relocated the letters) who had founded a spiritual organization with a very strict hierarchy, from which he recruited the members that would make up Salaligan. The circumstances surrounding the murders and other crimes performed by the gang are not fully known and there are many stories about astonishing plans that were never executed. Thurneman's many lies and different stories further make many details surrounding the gang and its actions unknown.

== Chronological recollection ==
=== The magic circle ===
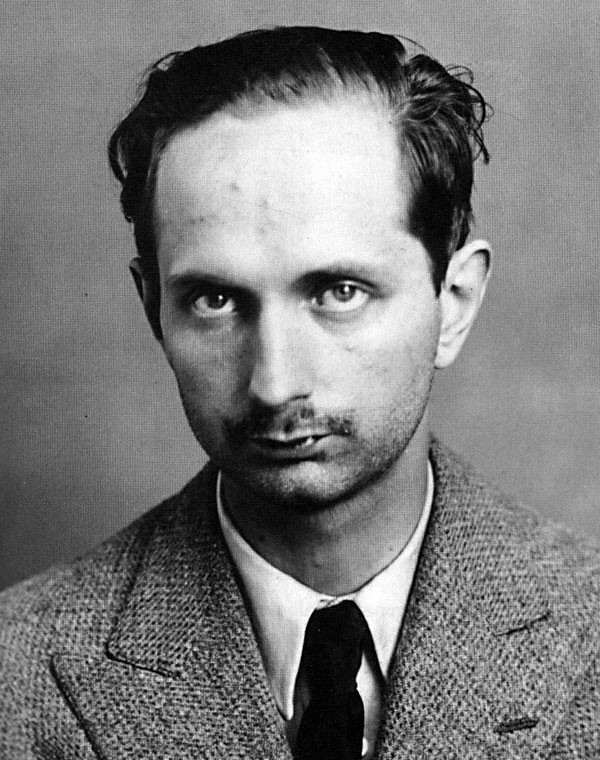
Mug shot of Sala gang leader Sigvard Thurneman.

Sigvard Thurneman was born as Sigvard Nilsson in Sala in 1908 and never did well in school. Considered well below average in Swedish and mathematics and also physically weak, he left school and began working at his father's store, a gentlemen's outfitters.

In 1924, at an exhibition in Sala, Thurneman made contact with a Danish mystic named Karl Andersen. It is doubted whether this was his real name and if he existed at all, in any case he has never been found. Calling himself mästaren (the "master"), he introduced Thurneman to a movement named Den magiska cirkeln ("The magic circle"), which he was the leader of in his native country. It was a Raya-Yoga movement originating in the East. Andersen told Thurneman how everything, even murder, is allowed if it promotes one's own interests. Thurneman wrote in his diary:

"To take another man's life is no crime, it only means a change in the physical state, since the soul is immortal and lives on in something else, an animal or a human being. To take from another human being only means a change in the state of possession in this life."

(Swedish original quote: "Att ta en annan mans liv är inget brott, det innebär bara en förändring i det fysiska tillståndet, eftersom själen är odödlig och lever vidare i någonting annat, ett djur eller en människa. Att ta från en annan människa innebär bara en förändring i besittningstillståndet i det här livet.")

Following the exhibition, Thurneman read up on the movement and encouraged by Andersen, he founded a Swedish division of it with himself as its leader. He wrote the regulations of the organization, borrowing the main structures from the Danish counterpart. At the top of the organization would be the "Triangle", considering of three members. Then would follow the "Inner circle", with trusted members, and finally the "Outer circle" with the rest of the participants.

Each member had to sign a contract where he obliged "to perform every action he could be prescribed" and that failure to do so would be punished by death after a decision by the "Triangle". Hypnosis, Thurneman explained, to make the defector lose his memory or commit suicide, could be a suitable punishment instead of actually killing him.

While it is not known how many signed the contract, it was indeed signed by a few.

It was at this time that Thurneman changed his name from Nilsson. It has since been suggested that Thurneman was chosen because it is an anagram of manhunter, although this has never been established for sure.

=== Preparing ===
In September 1930, Thurneman and two other members embarked on bicycle and motorcycle to a chalk mine outside of Sala. They made entrance to the basement where they found about 50 kg of dynamite and around 3000 spark plug boots. This being well more than they had expected, they had to make several trips with the motorcycle before they had transported the items to Thurneman's residence. The explosives were meant to be used in blowing up banks and creating bombs.

Although the plans were vague, the members were aware that they had to acquire money since the magic circle didn't have a member's fee. One way of getting hold of money would be to rob the dairy in Hedåker. Realizing that they would need a car to perform the task, one member, who had a history of stealing cars, offered to get one. Thurneman, however, had other plans for how the group would get hold of such a vehicle.

=== The first murder ===
On the Friday afternoon of November 14, 1930, Thurneman was given a ride on the motorcycle of one of the gang members. After arriving in Västerås, the friend returned to Sala and Thurneman went to a café. At ten past six, after drinking a cup of coffee, he headed for the telegram station where he phoned for a taxi to take him to Enköping. After cab driver Sven Eriksson, who turned forty years old the same day, had arrived and picked up Thurneman outside the café, they made a stop at a gas station to fill up before they continued.

What happened next is not fully known, since Thurneman at later questionings provided several stories about unknown men and named many different persons for the murder. The most plausible explanation is that it was indeed Thurneman who killed Eriksson. It is believed that he asked Eriksson to stop during the trip and that he, as soon as the car had come to a full stop, shot the driver with two shots in the neck. Thurneman would further have managed to move the body into the back seat after which he headed for Sala.

He met with Hedström at a prearranged place, picked him up and continued to a shaft at Sala silver mine, where the two men had already made an opening into the shaft. After dragging the body there, however, they realized that someone had fixed the hole that they had prepared, and they returned to the car with the body. The two men loaded the body back into the car and drove to Sörbobäcken (the Sörbo brook), where they stopped and threw the body into the rivulet.

Thurneman had managed to kill the taxi driver and steal his car, but he had failed to take the money of the man before he was thrown into the water. He had proved to himself that he had the ability to kill another man and the death threat in the contract signed by the members was now much more of a realistic threat.

The body of Sven Eriksson was discovered and identified the next day, as well as his bloodstained car. The police got a good idea of how the murder had been committed but never got close to finding the murderers.

A robbery — the motive for acquiring a car — was never executed so the "magic circle" was still short of cash. A couple of years later, an attempt was made, using fake police uniforms, to rob the dairy man, but he realized the scam and barricaded himself from the men and their guns.

In 1932, Thurneman and others of the gang prepared for a bank robbery. The plan was never executed, but if it had been, the bombs that were made for the occasion would have been more than enough to demolish the entire building.

=== Two more murders ===
The next year, Thurneman's cousin Herbert Jansson told him of the place where he worked. He informed of how the manager sometimes had large sums of money, intended for wages, at home. The two men and another member of the gang, Roland Abrahamsson, made plans of how they would use their fake police uniforms to get into the cabin. Kjellberg, the manager, and his maid would be killed and the place burned down. At the night to the 5th of September, 1933, they stole a car and headed for the location of the cabin, where Thurneman and Abrahamsson masqueraded as police officers. Bringing Jansson up to the door between themselves, they claimed to have caught a pyromaniac and asked to use the telephone.

As soon as the door was opened, Kjellberg was shot in the stomach and collapsed. After showing evidence of being alive, he received two more blows. Jansson rushed in to show the room of the maid, who managed to fight Thurneman for a while, before Abrahamsson shot her twice from close range.

After emptying the safe of about 10,000 SEK, the three men put some paper in it. They made a fire, left the house and split and hid the money before going home. When the fire was discovered at about four o' clock in the morning, there was nothing to do about it. The police did however realize that the amount of burned material in the safe was not enough and that there were no coins. Also, the coroner found bullet canals in the burned bodies. The police were never close to finding the perpetrators. Thurneman and Abrahamsson used most of their money to buy a Graham car and since this was suspicious, at one point an anonymous letter was sent to the police pointing out Abrahamsson and Thurneman for the murders, but the tip never resulted in anything.

The store operated by Thurneman's father was not doing well and the family moved to Stockholm. Thurneman insisted on renting a large flat, and offered to pay the entire rent, since he needed a room to perform hypnosis as a business. Thurneman kept contact with his friends in Sala, especially Jansson whom he paid 14:50 SEK every second week. This was from his share in the murder with robbery and the reason for the regular payments was that Thurneman was afraid that the friend might start talking in an intoxicated condition.

=== The murder that was never discovered ===
Spending most of its money on buying cars, the "magic circle" was now in need of more money. Someone in the gang had learned that an old lady named Matilda Blomkvist in Västerfärnebo had a lot of money at home, and claiming he was interested in selling an apartment, Abrahamsson visited her and noticed that the lady's house was full of small bags which she seemed very fond of. Convinced that they contained a lot of money, Thurneman and Abrahamsson made the plans and later invited Jansson.

Late on October 11, 1934, the three men went to the cabin in the Graham car. This time they wanted to avoid using guns, although they had brought them, and since Abrahamsson had heard of how one could kill rats by gassing them, they had come up with a plan.

Thurneman used a thick drill to make a hole in the wall while his comrades backed up the car. Using a hose, the cabin was filled with exhaust gas. Abrahamsson gave the engine a little extra gas and Thurneman could see the smoke flow through. While Jansson kept guard at the road, they filled the room for forty-five minutes. During this time Thurneman made a new hole into the kitchen. The hose was moved, and for yet another three quarters of an hour, the exhaust kept pouring into the house. They shut off the engine, climbed in through a window and opened all the doors and windows.

After finding a disappointing six kronor and fifty öre, and discovering that the bags spotted by Abrahamsson contained a lot of worthless items and no money, the three collected furniture and material in a pile. They lit the building and escaped. Thurneman later told that he had seen Blomqvist move in the flames. After the fire, which completely devastated the building before any help reached the location, the police was a bit suspicious considering what had happened in the area in the recent years. However, when the coroner reported that Blomqvist had died of carbon monoxide poisoning, it was assumed that the fire was a genuine accident caused by a crack in the chimney wall.

=== Planned bank robberies ===
The gang planned to blow up the main postal office at Vasagatan in Stockholm. This would kill hundreds of people and was meant to cause the entire police force of the city to engage in the investigations. In the chaos that would ensue, the gang would be able to rob the bank further down the street. A bomb consisting of 15 kg of dynamite was constructed and at several times, the plan was nearly put into action, always failing at some detail, for instance not enough members of the gang showing up at the day of the execution.

=== Another murder ===
What would prove to be the last murder of the gang was carried out on June 19, 1936. At lunch time that day, Elon Pettersson was riding his bike towards the lime mill bringing the workers' wages. This day, Pettersson was a little late due to having celebrated his 41st birthday, but the plan was still carried out. As Pettersson passed the gang's slowly moving car, Thurneman jumped out wearing a pilot's cap and goggles and pushed Pettersson into the ditch. He fired twice and wounded the man seriously. Pettersson tried to flee into the field alongside the road but Thurneman fired yet a few shots, fatally wounding the man. Thurneman grabbed the briefcase, still attached to the bicycle, and jumped into the car where Hedström acted as a getaway driver.

Pettersson managed to crawl to the road and a truck that passed the location immediately after the crime brought him to the hospital. He was operated but never regained conscience before dying the next morning.

The perpetrators fled into the woods where they hid the car and continued in another one, previously stolen by the gang and watched by Åke Lindberg. Thurneman dropped the two others off in Sala before continuing to Stockholm.

=== The arrests ===
Three days after the murder the police received the tip that would lead to the arrest of the Sala gang. A man told the police of how Hedström had asked him if he wanted to help him with a crime. He would only need to watch a car and the details he had received made him convinced that Hedström was involved in the murder with robbery. Hedström was arrested on the night to June 23 and Thurneman at his parents' outside of Stockholm the following morning.

=== Trial and verdict ===
The trial began on July 13 in Västerås and was highly covered by the press. Thurneman confessed his parts in the crimes although it was a question of more or less, depending on the mood of the day, while Abrahamsson claimed completely innocent for a long time before the evidence put forward made him confess more and more as the trial continued. The three other pleaded guilty from the start.

On February 22, 1937, Hedström, Abrahamsson, Jansson and Lindberg were sentenced with lifetime penal servitude. Thurneman was considered mentally sick and received closed psychiatric care. Despite the fact that the court could not affect the time length of Thurneman's verdict, a statement that "with consideration to the security of the society even at this point can be definitely laid down that Thurneman never should regain use of the freedom" made it clear that he should be locked up until his death.

=== Prison stay and release ===
Lindberg was released after seven and a half years in prison, while Hedström and Jansson were released after around ten years stay. Abrahamsson had to spend twelve years in prison before being released and he wrote a confession during his time in jail.

Thurneman spent just short of thirty years at the special ward for dangerous criminals at the hospital in Säter. He is reported to have become an ideal prisoner from the start. He became fluent in five languages, learned Sanskrit and became expert in that language and worked as a translator. He became good friends with Swedish forensic scientist Erik Karlmark who hired him as his assistant during the work on his thesis.

Around the end of the 50s and beginning of the 60s, Karlmark, who was one of many to believe that Thurneman was no longer a dangerous man, tried to get him released, but the media coverage and the public outcry made it impossible. During the second half of the 60s, Thurneman was discreetly moved from one clinic to another until he was at such an open clinic that his application for release didn't attract any attention from the public. He was released in early 1969 and moved to Abrahamsberg in Stockholm. His work as a translator, being one of Sweden's leading experts in Sanskrit and continued until he died in 1979.

== Later criticisms and speculations ==
When the brutal murders took place, it was assumed that they were committed by a gang from Stockholm or abroad. It is often stated that the confidence that the murders were strangers and the complete lack of experience in handling such crimes in small Sala, meant that the individual crimes of the Sala gang were seldom or never thoroughly investigated before the final murder in 1936.

Apart from the crimes for which the members of the gang were convicted, there are many speculations on other types of criminal acts that the gang would have carried out. It is often stated that the short time between the arrest of the gang and the beginning of the trial made it impossible for the police to be able to find out as much as they might have if they had taken a little more time. Although most of Thurneman's information was correct, little confidence was put into his statements and many trails were never followed.

In the early days, the gang used to deliver packages to Stockholm, Uppsala and Västerås and although the content of these packages is not known, it is most often assumed to have been narcotics. Most sources are confident that the gang were involved with smuggling of such drugs and Wikström and Wrangnert writes that it's possible that Thurneman acted in the outskirts of a Stockholm-based organization. Thurneman stated that the Triangle, the top of the magic circle, was located in Stockholm, and his mother testified that the father's business received many phone calls from Stockholm, asking for Thurneman.

The man who called himself Karl Andersen is mostly believed to have existed, although it seems no real efforts to find him were made at the time. Thurneman's family testified of how Thurneman and Andersen had been in contact, both by mail and by phone, and that Andersen had visited Thurneman in Sala.
