= Frank W. Spencer =

Civil rights activist and master river pilot

- Born: November 19, 1882; Savannah, Georgia, U.S.
- Died: July 26, 1979 (aged 96); Savannah, Georgia, U.S.
- Occupation(s): Maritime pilot, Civil rights activist
- Spouse: Lillian W. Spencer

Captain Frank W. Spencer (November 19, 1882 – July 26, 1979) was an American maritime pilot and civil rights activist in Savannah, Georgia, US. He served as the Master Pilot of the Port of Savannah for thirty years, and was instrumental in expanding the port to accommodate larger ships. He was also a community and civil rights activist, working for the political rights and education of the area's African American community.

== Life and career ==
Spencer was born November 19, 1882, in Savannah, Georgia, to Captain William H. and Mary Elizabeth Wilson Spencer. He attended Savannah public schools, and later attended the New York Nautical College, where he studied navigation and seamanship. He became a licensed Master and Marine Engineer and spent seventeen years at sea on United States vessels. During World War I, Spencer worked as a local manager for the U.S. Shipping Bureau. He was appointed the Master Pilot of the Port of Savannah, a position he served in for thirty years. In 1917, he opened the Upper Harbor's channel to ocean-going vessels, expanding the capacity of the port for trade and manufacturing. In 1920, Spencer joined the Atlantic Towing Company as General Manager and Treasurer, where he stayed until 1967. From 1917 to 1964, Spencer served in the American Pilots Association as its South Atlantic regional representative.

=== Community and civil rights activism ===
Spencer served as the head of the Chatham Area Boy Scout Council for three terms, organized a Sea Scouting program for the area, and helped start a Black chapter of the Boy Scouts of America during racial segregation. He served on the board of the Greenbriar Children's Center. During his eighteen years serving on the Chatham County Board of Education, he fought for equal pay for black and white school teachers (correcting a twenty percent difference in pay), and started a Port Education Project to teach students about the importance of Savannah's import and export trade connected to the port. In 1955, after his retirement from the Chatham County Board of Education, a new Black elementary school was named in Spencer's honor. Spencer served multiple terms as a Vice President of the Southern Regional Council, and both he and Lillian served as delegates of the Southern Conference Educational Fund. Spencer received threatening letters for his activism with the NAACP and author Lillian Smith.

=== Marriage and children ===
Spencer had five children from his first marriage, and married his second wife Lillian (Windau) Spencer in 1938 in New York. Lillian was influential on Frank's community involvement, and continued much of his charitable work after his death.

=== Death ===
Spencer died on July 26, 1979, in Savannah, Georgia. Since his death, a boat ramp park was named in his honor.

== Published works ==
- Spencer, Frank W. (1941). Savannah, the port: 1900-1941. OCLC 48264654.
- Spencer, Frank W. (1953). The Savannah River: address. OCLC 6061140.
- Spencer, Frank W. (1962). Savannah: the River and the port, 1900-1962. OCLC 25381907.
- Spencer, Frank W. (1966). The waterfront. OCLC 22970767.
