= Geoff Weber =

Australian rules footballer, born 1915

Personal information
- Full name: Geoff Weber
- Born: 9 January 1915
- Died: 12 July 1979 (aged 64)
- Original team: Brighton / Gardenvale Amateurs
- Height: 187 cm (6 ft 2 in)
- Weight: 96 kg (212 lb)

Playing career^{1}
Years	Club	Games (Goals)
1934	St Kilda	1 (0)
- ^{1} Playing statistics correct to the end of 1934.

Geoff Weber (9 January 1915 – 12 July 1979) was an Australian rules footballer who played with St Kilda in the Victorian Football League (VFL).
