= Gotfred Johan Hølvold =

Norwegian politician

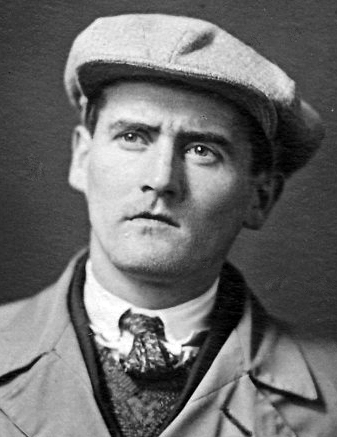
- Hølvold c.1940
- Born: 22 April 1903; Vardø, Norway
- Died: 28 July 1979 (aged 76)
- Occupations: Politician, sailor
- Spouse: Hildur Hølvold

Gotfred Johan Hølvold (22 April 1903 – 28 July 1979) was a Norwegian politician who was a member of the Norwegian Communist Party. During World War II, he was a refugee in the Soviet Union, working on Comintern missions and Radio Moscow's Norwegian broadcasts.

He was born in Vardø Municipality to Johan Hølvold and Anna Berteussen. He was elected representative to the Storting for the period 1954–1957 for the Communist Party.

Hølvold died on 28 July 1979.
