= Ethel B. Dietrich =

American economist (1891–1976)

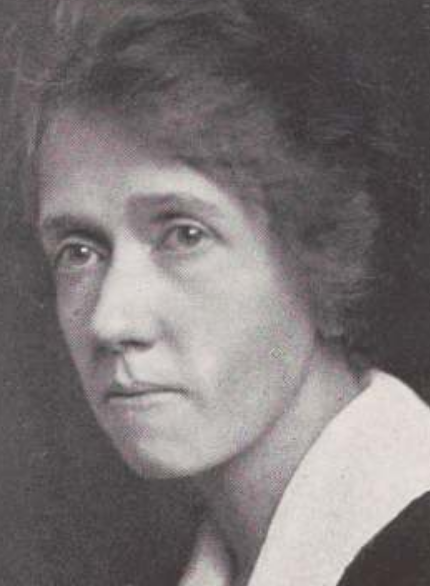
- Ethel B. Dietrich, from a 1924 yearbook
- Born: Ethel Barbara Dietrich; October 16, 1891; Racine, Wisconsin
- Died: July 31, 1979; Wilmette, Illinois
- Occupation(s): Economist, foreign service officer

Ethel Barbara Dietrich (October 16, 1891 – July 31, 1979) was an American economist, college professor, foreign service officer, and author of World Trade (1939), and Far Eastern Trade of the United States (1940).

== Early life ==
Ethel B. Dietrich was born in Racine, Wisconsin, the daughter of Charles M. Dietrich and Kittie Packard Dietrich. She graduated from Vassar College in 1913, and completed a master's degree and a Ph.D. at the University of Wisconsin.

== Career ==
Dietrich taught economics at Mount Holyoke College for 22 years. She wrote and lectured on international trade issues, including a book, World Trade (1939), a report for the Institute of Pacific Relations titled United States Commercial Relations with the Far East (1939), and a related book, Far Eastern Trade of the United States (1940). Her scholarly articles appeared in The Journal of Political Economy, International Labour Review, The Annals of the American Academy of Political and Social Science, and Far Eastern Survey.

Dietrich worked with the Foreign Economic Administration during World War II. After the war, she was a member of the American delegation at the Reparations Conference in 1945, helped draft the initial proposal for the International Trade Organization, was deputy chief of the Trade and Commerce Branch, Economics Division, OMGUS, and was U.S. economic officer posted to NATO, based in Paris. She received a Career Service Award from the National Civil Service League, and retired as a Foreign Service Reserve Officer in 1961.

== Personal life ==
Ethel B. Dietrich died in Wilmette, Illinois, in 1979, aged 87 years.
