= Sigvard Thurneman =

Swedish criminal

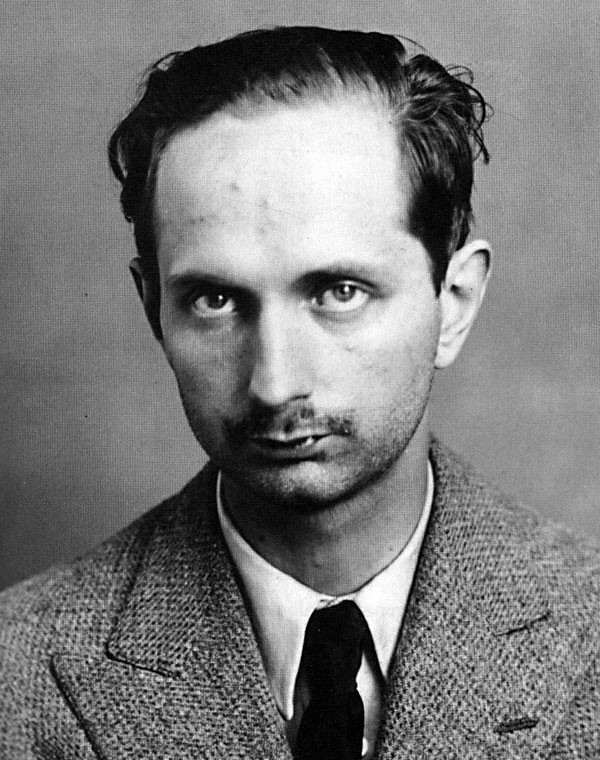
Sigvard Thurneman

Sven Emil Sigvard Nilsson-Thurneman (November 14, 1908 in Sala, Sweden – July 11, 1979 in Bromma, Sweden), was the leader of the so-called "Salaligan" (The Sala gang) during the first years of the 1930s. Thurneman, a young office clerk, was said to have formed his assumed name upon an anagram from the English word "manhunter", although this proved to be false.

Thurneman was known to speak English, but he spoke German much better. When he was applying for a name change, he gave two suggestions: "Thurneman" and "Turneman". Both names were variations of a common German surname.

== The Sala gang ==
Apart from Thurneman, the Sala gang consisted of Bror Hedström, Åke Rangvald Lindberg, Roland Abrahamsson, and Karl Herbert Jansson. The gang perpetrated robberies with murder. When discovered in 1936, Salaligan had committed five murders. Thurneman was interested in mysticism, which had a great influence on the gang members, who called themselves Den magiska cirkeln ("The magical circle", abbreviated "DMC"). Thurneman had his fellow accomplices inhale incense from different herbs, claiming this to make them cold hearted and "willing instruments of murder" ("villiga mordredskap"). Thurneman claimed the murdering of a human not to be an unjust act, but rather an act imposing a transition of the person's physical state.

== The murders ==
The first homicide was committed on November 15, 1930. Thurneman shot the taxi driver Sven Eriksson from Västerås with two bullets in the back of his head. The wallet of the taxi driver, containing 250 kronor, was left unstolen.

On the night of November 5, 1933 Axel Kjellberg and his maid Karin Holmberg were killed in Kjellbergs house in Kölfors, Enåker parish, Uppland, Sweden. They were shot, whereafter the house was set on fire.

In 1934, Erika Mathilda Blomqvist in Hällby outside Västerfärnebo was killed in a way that afterwards has been described as the perfect crime. This being because the police at first wrote off the incident as an accident. The gang drove a stolen car to the isolated cabin in which the woman lived, backed the car towards the house wall, whereafter the exhaust fumes from the car were led through a rubber hose, inserted in a hole in the cabin wall that the gang had drilled. When the victim was not moving, the felons broke into the house and looted it and set it on fire. The Police thought the woman was deceased in a self-caused arson, and the crime was not uncovered until the confession of the gang, following upon its arrest. The fifth and last murder was perpetrated on June 19, 1936, when the bank courier Edvard Pettersson was assaulted, robbed and murdered.

== Trial ==
The Sala gang was disclosed when an acquaintance of Hedström got in touch with the police after having read about the fifth murder in the newspapers. Hedström had asked the man to join the gang in a robbery, but the man refused. The members were found guilty on February 22, 1937, and sentenced to lifetime imprisonment with hard labour. All of the members were released after having served between seven and ten years. Thurneman was pardoned and diagnosed as mentally ill, and imprisoned at the Asylum of Säter, and released in the 1960s.

During the last years of his life, Thurneman worked as a translator in a suburb outside Stockholm, where he eventually died shortly after his 70th birthday. In accordance with his last will, he was buried in his birth city of Sala.
