= Don Stewart (Australian footballer) =

Australian rules footballer, born 1913

Personal information
- Full name: Don Stewart
- Born: 16 July 1913
- Died: 9 July 1979 (aged 65)
- Original team: Murtoa

Playing career^{1}
| Years | Club | Games (Goals) |
| 1932 | St Kilda | 4 (0) |
- ^{1} Playing statistics correct to the end of 1932.

Don Stewart (16 July 1913 – 9 July 1979) was an Australian rules footballer who played with St Kilda in the Victorian Football League (VFL).
