= Márcia Mendes =

Brazilian actress and journalist (1945–1979)

- Born: 6 July 1945; Mato Grosso do Sul, Brazil
- Died: 6 July 1979 (aged 34); Rio de Janeiro, Brazil
- Occupations: Actress; journalist

Márcia Mendes (July 6, 1945, in Mato Grosso do Sul – July 6, 1979, in Rio de Janeiro) was a Brazilian actress and journalist. She was a journalist of TV newscast Jornal Hoje for Rede Globo.
