= Kosti Kankainen =

Finnish Lutheran pastor and politician (1894–1979)

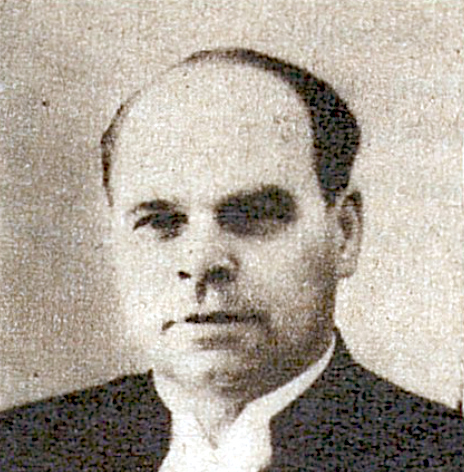
Kosti Kankainen

Kosti Aarno Aleksi Kankainen (9 April 1894 – 20 July 1979) was a Finnish Lutheran pastor and politician, born in Turku. He was a member of the Parliament of Finland from 1945 to 1948, representing the National Coalition Party. He was a presidential elector in the 1950 presidential election.
