= Edward A. Krug =

American historian (1911–1979)

Edward A. Krug (September 26, 1911 – July 30, 1979) was the University of Wisconsin–Madison's first Virgil E. Herrick Professor of Educational Policy Studies.

Krug attended Northwestern University, receiving a B.A. in 1933 and M.A. in 1934. He then taught social studies at Evanston Township High School until 1938. In 1941, he received his Ph.D. from Stanford University thereafter accepting a temporary appointment as assistant professor. In 1943, he became a visiting assistant professor at [the University of Montana (www.umt.edu/)]. In 1945, Krug became the Wisconsin State Curriculum Coordinator and held a concurrent position as associate professor of education at the University of Wisconsin–Madison. In 1947, he returned to Stanford as an associate professor, but returned to Madison the next year.

Krug's early works dealt with US social life. Beginning in 1950, Krug began a long publishing career on the history of US education. In 1950 he published Curriculum Planning and, a decade later, Secondary School Curriculum. He also wrote Charles W. Eliot and Popular Education (1961) and Salient Dates in American Education (1966). He collaborated on Schools and Our Democratic Society (1952), Multzple-Period Organization in Wisconsin Secondary Schools (1952), Administering Curriculum Planning (1957) and The College-Preparatory Function in Wisconsin High Schools (1959).

His legacy, though, was established by a two-volume study of the American high school, The Shaping of the American High School (vol. 1, 1964; vol. 2 1971). This text is recognized as the standard history of this institution.
