= Helena Cehak-Holubowiczowa =

Polish archaeologist (1902–1979)

Helena Cehak-Holubowiczowa (12 February 1902, in Ivano-Frankivsk – 19 July 1979, in Wrocław) was a Polish archaeologist, best remembered for her excavations specialising in pottery from the Middle Ages in the Sudeten Foreland in 1949, in Opole in 1952, in Radunia from 1955 to 1956, and in Trzebnica from 1967 to 1974. Beginning her career at Vilnius University in 1931, she was made assistant professor in the Department of Archaeology at the Nicolaus Copernicus University in Toruń in 1946, and then at the University of Wrocław from 1950. For her work, she was invested with the Order of Polonia Restituta, the Cross of Merit in 1939, and the Medal of the 10th Anniversary of People's Poland in 1955.
