= Olha Hasyn =

- Ольга Юріївна Гасин
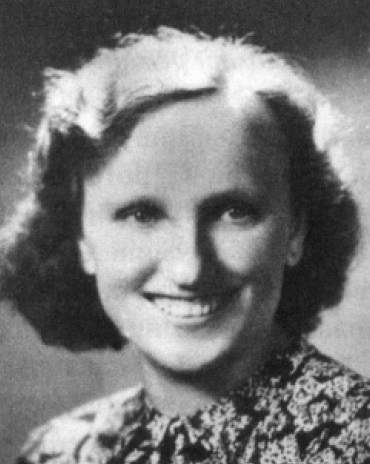
- Born: Olha Pelenychka; 19 September 1913; Koniukhiv, Stryi powiat, Kingdom of Galicia and Lodomeria, Austria-Hungary
- Died: 27 July 1979 (aged 65); Brovary, Kyiv Oblast, Ukrainian SSR, USSR
- Resting place: Brovary; 50.5002437°N 30.7982022°E
- Other name: pseudonym "Lesya"
- Citizenship: Austria-Hungary, Second Polish Republic, Soviet Union
- Education: Stryi women's gymnasium; Agricultural courses
- Organization: Organization of Ukrainian Nationalists
- Spouse: Oleksa Hasyn
- Children: Oleh, Oksana and Daryna

Olha Yuriivna Hasyn (Ukrainian: Ольга Юріївна Гасин, née Pelenychka, 19 September 1913, Koniukhiv, Austria-Hungary – 27 July 1979, Brovary, Soviet Union) – undercover agent of Organization of Ukrainian Nationalists, assistant and liaison officer of Roman Shukhevych, the leader of the Ukrainian Insurgent Army, and of Oleksa Hasyn, her husband and an important figure in UIA. In her native village there is a museum dedicated to her. Also, a street in Brovary is named after her.

== Biography ==
Olha Pelenychka was born on 19 September 1913 (in some sources 1912 is listed as a year of birth) in the village of Konyukhiv, Austria-Hungary, now Stryi Raion, Lviv Oblast, Ukraine. She graduated from Stryi women's gymnasium and the Agricultural courses of Ukrainian Women's Union, after which she for some time worked as a teacher. As of year 1937, she was the leader of the Stryi chapter of Ukrainian Women's Union. From her first day in this organization she took an active part in its activity.

In 1936 she married with Oleksa Hasyn, who lived in the same village with her. She joined her husband in ideas of Ukrainian nationalism. In the Ukrainian Women's Union she was opposed to the predominance of feminism over nationalism. Later she became an undercover agent of Organization of Ukrainian Nationalists under the pseudonym "Lesya", as well as the assistant and liaison officer of Roman Shukhevych and Oleksa Hasyn, in particular, she was responsible for appointing confidential apartments for them in Lviv.

On 25 January 1949 she was arrested by soviet law enforcement in Dobriany. Before it, she left her children in the Lviv house of daughter of priest from her native village, but NKVD found them anyway. A week later, on 31 January soviet law enforcement tracked down her husband, Oleksa Hasyn, and he committed suicide during arrest attempt. After that, soviet law enforcement released Olha Hasyn hoping that she will lead them to somebody else from the Organization of Ukrainian Nationalists, but she cut all contacts and even tried to escape from surveillance. In March 1949 she was arrested again. In 1950 the Special Council of the NKVD sentenced her to 10 years of imprisonment in Gulag camp in Tayshet, Irkutsk Oblast. She spent only 6 years there.

She was released in 1956, but she was forbidden to return to Western Ukraine, because she refused to abandon her political ideas. After a year of living in multiple places and marrying her second husband Mykola Makoda, who was also a former political prisoner, she settled in Brovary, a satellite city of Kyiv, where she lived until her death on 27 July 1979.

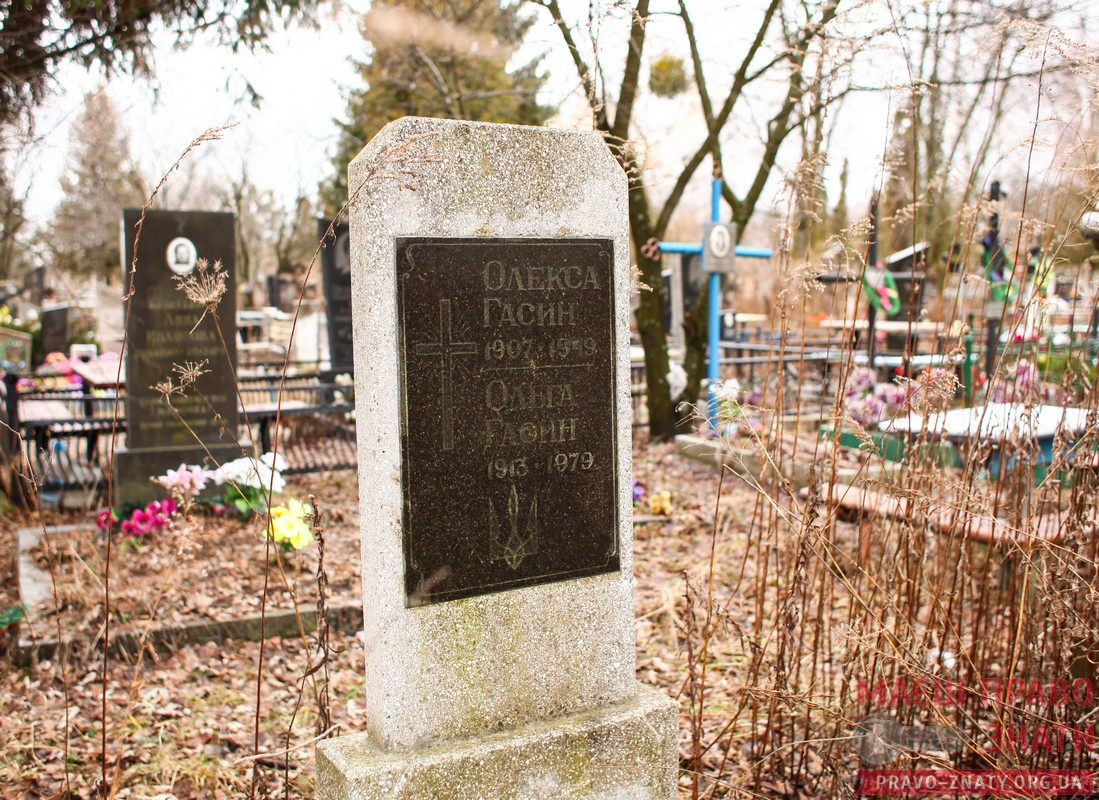
Grave of Olha Hasyn in Brovary.

== Family ==
- Maria, sister
- Oleksa Hasyn, first husband, Ukrainian political and military figure
  - Oleh, son, born 1940. Was brought up with a changed surname in the family of Bodnari. who lived in Lviv. Before the 4th grade he was taught at home and was not even allowed to go outside, so that he could not tell anyone who he really was. Later he graduated from Taras Shevchenko National University of Kyiv.
  - Oksana, daughter, born 1942. Was put into the orphanage with a special regime. Later graduated from Lviv Polytechnic.
  - Daryna, daughter, born 1943. Was put into the orphanage with a special regime. Later graduated from Ukrainian National Forestry University.
- Mykola Makoda, second husband, former political prisoner.

== Sources ==
- Karpiy, Dmytro (2 April 2016). Ольга Гасин. Історія зв'язкової генерала Шухевича, що мешкала у Броварах [Olha Hasyn. The history of a liaison officer of Roman Shukhevych, who lived in Brovary.] (in Ukrainian). Маєш право знати. Archived from the original on 12 March 2016.
- Demian, Hryhorii (2013). Генерал УПА Олекса Гасин – "Лицар" [Ukrainian Insurgent Army general Oleksa Hasyn – "The Knight"] (in Ukrainian). Lviv: Institute of Ethnology of the National Academy of Sciences of Ukraine. ISBN 978-966-02-2650-0.
- Bilan, Bohdan (31 May 2012). Смерть від власної кулі [Death from own bullet.] (in Ukrainian). ZIK. Archived from the original on 7 November 2017.
- Hanas, Zenovia (2007). Нариси з історії жіночого руху Стрийщини [Essays on the history of the women movement of Stryj] (in Ukrainian). Stryi: Ukrpol. ISBN 978-966-8955-02-0.
- Oleksa Hasyn - Electronic archive of the Ukrainian liberation movement (in Ukrainian)
- Oleksa Hasyn - www.stryi.com.ua (in Ukrainian)
- Юлія Овсяник, «Лицар» УПА. Zbruč. 18 July 2017.Ovsyanyk, Yulia (18 July 2017). "Лицар" УПА ["Cavalier" of Ukrainian Insurgent Army.] (in Ukrainian). Zbruc.
