= Hoël Pattisson =

English cricketer

Personal information
- Full name: Hoël Carlos Pattisson
- Born: 5 September 1905; West Byfleet, Surrey, England
- Died: 10 July 1979 (aged 73); Playden, Sussex, England
- Role: Wicket-keeper

Career statistics
Competition	First-class
Matches	1
Runs scored	20
Batting average	10.00
100s/50s	0/0
Top score	20
Catches/stumpings	0/–
- Source: Cricinfo, 25 October 2015

Hoël Carlos Pattisson (5 September 1905 – 10 July 1979) was an English cricketer who made one appearance in first-class cricket in 1937.

Educated at Rugby School, Pattisson made his only appearance in first-class cricket in 1937 when he was selected to play for the Free Foresters against Oxford University at the Oxford. He played as a wicket-keeper in the match, as well as captaining the team. He was dismissed bowled by Randle Darwall-Smith without scoring in the Free Foresters first-innings, while in their second-innings he scored 20 runs before being bowled by Bill Murray-Wood. Oxford University won the match by 10 wickets.

He died at Playden, Sussex on 10 July 1979.
