= Kathleen Romoli =

American anthropologist (1897–1979)

- Born: Kathleen Martin; December 5, 1897; Santa Rosa, California, U.S.
- Died: July 16, 1979 (aged 81); Bogotá, Colombia
- Occupations: Anthropologist; historian; filmmaker
- Spouses: Ralph Cahoon Whitnack (died 1919) Guglielmo Reiss Romoli (m. 1920, divorced) William Avery (m. 1950; died 1953)
- Children: 1
- Awards: Guggenheim Fellowship (1943)

Academic work
- Discipline: Colombian studies

Kathleen Romoli (née Martin; December 5, 1897 – July 16, 1979) was an American anthropologist, historian, and filmmaker. After making a promotional film for the Gold Platinum mining company, she decided to move to anthropology. She wrote Colombia: Gateway to South America (1941), Balboa of Darien: Discoverer of the Pacific (1953), and Los de la lengua cueva (1987).

== Biography ==
Kathleen Martin was born on December 5, 1897, in Santa Rosa, California, to Irish immigrant parents—one of whom worked as a Presbyterian minister. She originally lived in Japan, Mumbai, and Venice, before moving to Park Avenue in New York City for her second husband's job. Originally interested in being an artist and in opening her own nursery in Vadodara, she eventually started in publicity and writing, and she once received personal thanks from Benito Mussolini when she released an edited volume of his speeches, Eleven Years of Fascism Through the Word of the Duce (1934).

After meeting education minister Agustín Nieto Caballero at a party, she visited Colombia alongside her husband, and eventually moved to the country. In 1937, she making a promotional film for Gold Platinum, titled A Journey to the Operations of the South American Gold Platinum Co. In addition to Gold Platinum, she directed two other travelogue movies, Flood, Picnic and Baseball Game at a Dredge Camp (1936/1937) and Colombian Scenes (1940/1941).

Despite centering on the eponymous company's operations in the Pacific/Chocó natural region, Gold Platinum also depicted the Emberá people. Isabel Arredondo called it an "early manifestation of post-colonial awareness" similar to Third Cinema documentaries, citing the attention it gives to Emberá and Afro-Colombians alongside mining operations, and said that it was the only woman-made Colombian silent film. Having become aware of deals to exploit natural resources between the Colombian government and global mining companies, she decided to work in anthropology, and she never talked with her family about Gold Platinum, which was not rediscovered until after her death.

Romoli wrote several books: Colombia: Gateway to South America (1941), focusing on the country's history, geography, and culture; Balboa of Darien: Discoverer of the Pacific (1953), a book on the Darien scheme; and Los de la lengua cueva, a posthumously-published study on differences between the Cueva and Guna peoples. In 1943, she was awarded a Guggenheim Fellowship to research the Darien scheme, later forming the basis of Balboa of Darien. In 1961, she became a researcher at the Colombian Institute of Anthropology and History (ICANH), one of the first women to do so.

Germán Arciniegas said of Romoli in a 1953 El Tiempo article: "when a woman insists on tracking a conquistador, she touches the most complicated of labyrinths with charm, with instinctive refinement in detail". She was the second woman to be a member of the Colombian Academy of History, joining in the 1950s shortly after Balboa of Darien's publication. She was also awarded the Order of Boyacá. Ximena Pachón called Romoli "a pioneer in Colombian ethno-history, from whom we inherited an important academic legacy".

== Personal life ==
She was married to Ralph Cahoon Whitnack, an economics professor at Keio University, until his death in 1919; they had one son, who later became a Westinghouse Electric Corporation employee. In the 1920s, she married her second husband, Banca Commerciale Italiana worker Guglielmo Reiss Romoli. They later divorced after World War II, presumably due to the difficulties of the war, which resulted in her husband being interned as an Italian national in the country. In 1950, she married William Avery, an engineer who himself worked for Gold Platinum; they remained married until his death in 1953.

Romoli lived in La Esmeralda, an estate she owned in Trujillo, Valle del Cauca, since the 1940s, and later in an apartment in Teusaquillo. She had a vibrant social life in Bogotá, and she was close to anthropologist Sylvia Broadbent. Her personal library reportedly attracted overseas researchers working in Bogotá. She also spoke Spanish in an English accent, and reportedly used antiquated words like más and sin embargo instead of pero and empero due to her experiences with Spanish archival material.

Romoli died on July 16, 1979, in Bogotá, while hospitalized for a stroke. Despite being distant, her son arrived in Colombia during her final moments. She had a funeral at the English Cemetery, Málaga. After Romoli's death, her executor Ana María Groot, a close colleague of hers from ICANH, found some of her scattered writings and had them published as Los de la lengua cueva.

== Bibliography ==
- Colombia: Gateway to South America (1941)
- Balboa of Darien: Discoverer of the Pacific (1953)
- Los de la lengua cueva (1987)
