= Frank H. Ellis =

Canadian aviator and historian (1893–1979)

Frank H. Ellis, OC (October 13, 1893 – July 4, 1979) was an early Canadian aviator and member of the Early Birds of Aviation. He was born in Nottingham, England, in 1893 and immigrated to Calgary, Alberta with his family in 1912. With Tom Blakely, he constructed and flew a biplane designed after a Curtiss model in 1914. He was the first Canadian to make a parachute jump from an airplane in Canada, July 5, 1919, at Crystal Beach, Fort Erie, Ontario. Beside his day job as bus driver, Ellis wrote extensively on the history of aviation, and was an avid aircraft model builder. He located several historic Canadian aviation artifacts and arranged for their donation to museums. In 1954 he published "Canada's Flying Heritage", the first major study of the history of aviation in Canada. In 1972, he was awarded the Medal of Service of the Order of Canada. He died July 4, 1979, at the age of 85, in North Vancouver, BC.

On July 5, 1979, the day just after Ellis died, Bill Cole of Ontario, Canada, performed an exhibition parachute jump into the water of Lake Erie at Crystal Beach to mark the 60th anniversary of Ellis's historical jump. Cole used equipment similar to what Ellis used.
