= Robert L. Denig =

United States Marine Corps general

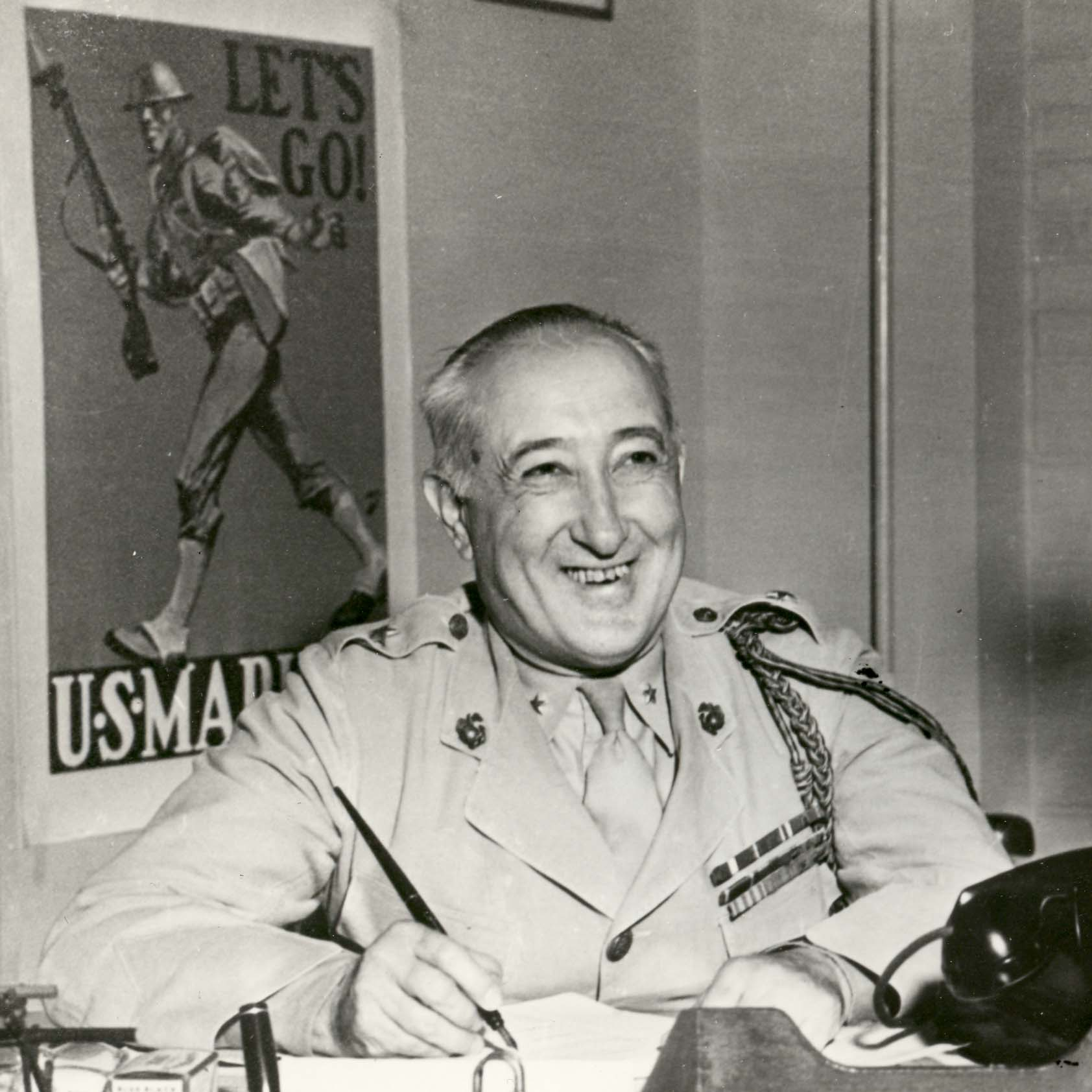
- Born: Robert Livingston Denig; September 29, 1884; Clinton, New York, US
- Died: July 25, 1979 (aged 94); Los Altos, California, US
- Relatives: Commodore Robert G. Denig (father); Robert L. Denig, Jr. (son); Charles A. E. Denig (son); James L. Denig (son, killed in action, World War II)
- Military career
- Allegiance: United States
- Branch: United States Marine Corps
- Service years: 1905–1945
- Rank: Brigadier general
- Commands: Director of Public Information
- Conflicts: Banana Wars: Cuban Pacification; Occupation of Nicaragua; World War I: Battle of Belleau Wood; Battle of Château-Thierry; Battle of Soissons; World War II
- Awards: Navy Cross / Army Distinguished Service Cross; Legion of Merit; Purple Heart Medal (2)

Robert Livingston Denig Sr. (September 29, 1884 – July 25, 1979) was a decorated United States Marine Corps brigadier general who served in World War I, and served as its first director of public information during World War II. He is credited with "fathering" the idea of combat correspondents in the United States Armed Forces during World War II.

== Biography ==
=== Early life ===
Robert Livingston Denig was born on September 29, 1884, as a son of navy officer Commodore Robert G. Denig and his wife Jane (néé Jane Livingston Hubbard) in Clinton, New York. Robert L. Denig spent most of his childhood in Japan, because his father was posted there, while serving with the U.S. Asiatic Fleet. Denig moved then with his family to Sandusky, Ohio, where he attended high school. He attended the University of Pennsylvania from 1903 to 1905.

=== Military service ===
Denig became a member of 6th Ohio Regiment of the National Guard in 1900 and attended the University of Pennsylvania.

==== Marine Corps ====
He was appointed a second lieutenant in the United States Marine Corps on September 29, 1905. After studies at the Officer Candidates School at Annapolis, Maryland, in 1906, he was assigned to the Provisional Marine Brigade, which late took part in Cuban Occupation. Denig served there until November 1907.

He served in France during World War I. He commanded the Second Battalion, 6th Marine Regiment during the battle of Soissons. After the battle, he served as a Marine Corps major attached to and in command of a U.S. Army battalion of the 9th Infantry Regiment, 2nd Infantry Division, and was awarded the Distinguished Service Cross by the United States Army and Navy Cross by the U.S. Marine Corps for extraordinary heroism on October 3, 1918. He served in Nicaragua in 1930 and 1931.

He was promoted to brigadier general on June 30, 1941, and put on the retired list. He was recalled to active duty for World War II and became the first Marine Corps director of public information.

His son, Marine Captain James L. Denig, was killed in action while serving as a tank company commander on February 1, 1944, during the invasion of the Marshall Islands at the Battle of Kwajalein.

=== Death ===
Denig died on July 25, 1979. He was buried in Arlington National Cemetery.

== Military awards ==
Denig's military decorations and awards include:

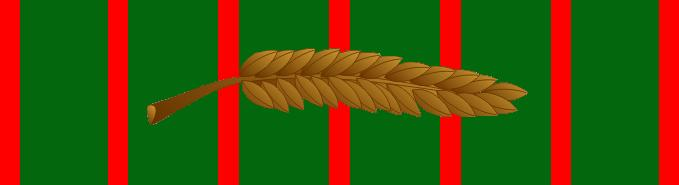

1st Row	Navy Cross		Distinguished Service Cross	Legion of Merit
2nd Row	Purple Heart Medal with one 5/16" gold star	Marine Corps Expeditionary Medal with two 3/16" bronze stars	Cuban Pacification Medal	World War I Victory Medal with two 3/16" bronze stars (2 battle clasps)
3rd Row	Nicaraguan Campaign Medal (1933)	American Defense Service Medal with one 3/16" bronze star (base clasp)	American Campaign Medal	Asiatic-Pacific Campaign Medal
4th Row	World War II Victory Medal	Officer of the Legion of Honour	French Croix de guerre 1914–1918 with silver star and palm	Nicaraguan Medal of Merit with silver star
