= Hermann Glockner =

German philosopher und university lecturer

Hermann Glockner (July 23, 1896 in Fürth – July 11, 1979 in Braunschweig) was a German philosopher and aesthetician. Glockner's correspondence with Theodor Haering is kept at Deutsches Literaturarchiv Marbach, and at the University Library Tübingen.

== Life and work ==
Glockner was born in Fürth, the son of Sebastian Glockner, who later became a school inspector. Hermann Glockner was attending Fürth grammar school when, in 1908, neo-idealist philosopher Rudolf Eucken was awarded the Nobel Prize.

Glockner studied philosophy in Munich, Erlangen and Heidelberg and received his doctorate in 1919 under Paul Hensel in Erlangen. In 1924 he habilitated under Heinrich Rickert in Heidelberg. Glockner was a lecturer at Heidelberg from 1924 and a professor from 1930, when he received the Kuno Fischer Award jointly with August Faust. In cooperation with the latter Glockner published Heidelberg Treatises (Abhandlungen) on Philosophy and Its History until 1945.

From 1933 to 1949, Glockner was a professor at the University of Giessen, where he was Dean of the Faculty of Philosophy from 1933 to 1937. Both Glockner and his philosopher friend Theodor Haering attended the 1933 Hegel Congress in Rome. From 1934 Glockner edited, with Karl Larenz, the Zeitschrift für Deutsche Kulturphilosophie. Neue Folge des Logos.

After the war fellow-traveller Glockner managed an appointment at the TU Braunschweig in 1951, where he taught until 1964. He was a full member of the Braunschweig Scientific Society from 1955, and often is considered one of the most important representatives of (heterogeneous) neo-Hegelianism in Germany. In 1971 Glockner was awarded the Golden Citizen's Medal of the City of Fürth; his estate is administered in the Fürth city archives.

=== Glockner and National socialism ===
Glockner was appointed to Giessen because in his "fight against Semitic influence in German philosophy in recent decades" he was considered to be "standing firmly on the ground of the National Socialist world view".

In 1934, he joined the National Socialist People's Welfare Organization (NSV) and became co-editor of the Zeitschrift für Deutsche Kulturphilosophie in the same year. In 1942, he joined the National Socialist German Lecturers League (NSDDB) and applied for membership of the NSDAP, which was rejected. The reasons for this are not known. He was presumably accused of not immediately rushing to take up arms during a language course in Switzerland at the beginning of the World War I, but instead continuing to stay in the "culture-saturated atmosphere of peace" (kulturgesättigten Friedensatmosphäre) in Switzerland. Glockner's philosophy, on the other hand, was classified in the "SD dossiers on philosophy professors" of the Security Service of the Reichsführer SS as "politically impeccable" and "determined by the principles of the NS".

=== Hegel and Glockner ===
He was a Hegel researcher and editor of the Hegel anniversary edition in 24 volumes from 1927 to 1940. Glockner was one of the best experts on Hegel in the pre-war period. In 1941, he considered German philosophy to be "to a higher degree than any other philosophy originating from the people and connected to the people" and tried to compare Hitler's importance in politics with that of Hegel in philosophy: "The struggle is the father of all things. So in the field of philosophy, too, a strong procreative power is undoubtedly developed in the years of war and hardship."

== Works ==
- Fr. Th. Vischers Ästhetik in ihrem Verhältnis zu Hegels Phänomenologie des Geistes. L. Voss, Leipzig 1920.
- Die ethisch-politische Persönlichkeit des Philosophen. J.C.B. Mohr, Tübingen 1922.
- Der Begriff in Hegels Philosophie. J.C.B. Mohr, Tübingen 1924.
- Das philosophische Problem in Goethes Farbenlehre. Carl Winter, Heidelberg 1924.
- Hegel, Sämtliche Werke. Frommann, Stuttgart, 1927–1940.
  - Band 21: Die Voraussetzungen der hegelschen Philosophie.
  - Band 22: Entwicklung und Schicksal der hegelschen Philosophie.
- Hegel und seine Philosophie. Carl Winter, Heidelberg 1931.
- Friedrich Theodor Vischer und das 19. Jahrhundert. Junker &. Dünnhaupt, Berlin 1931.
- Johann Eduard Erdmann. Frommann, Stuttgart 1932 (Frommanns Klassiker der Philosophie vol. 30).
- Wilhelm Busch. Der Mensch, der Zeichner, der Humorist. Mohr, Tübingen 1932.
- Heinrich von Stein. Schicksal einer deutschen Jugend. Mohr, Tübingen 1934.
- Das Abenteuer des Geistes. Frommann, Stuttgart 1938.
- Schiller. Kohlhammer Stuttgart 1941.
- Vom Wesen der deutschen Philosophie. Kohlhammer, Stuttgart 1941.
- Einführung in das Philosophieren. Buchholz & Weißwange, Berlin 1944.
- Identität und Individualität. Nordwestdt. Univ. Ges., Wilhelmshaven 1952.
- Philosophie und Technik. Agis-Verlag, Krefeld 1953.
- Die europäische Philosophie von den Anfängen bis zur Gegenwart. Reclam, Stuttgart 1958.
- Hundert Aussprüche Hegels. Frommann (Holzboog), Stuttgart 1958.
- Gegenständlichkeit und Freiheit. 2 Bände, Bouvier, Bonn 1963.
  - Band I: Metaphysische Meditationen zur Fundamentalphilosophie.
  - Band II: Metaphysische Meditationen zur philosophischen Anthropologie.
- Beiträge zum Verständnis und zur Kritik Hegels sowie zur Umgestaltung seiner Geisteswelt. Bouvier, Bonn 1965. Hegel-Studien, Beiheft Nr. 2.
- Rationalität, Phänomenalität, Individualität. Bouvier, Bonn 1966.
- Heidelberger Bilderbuch. Erinnerungen. Bouvier, Bonn 1969.
- Paraphilosophica. 1969.
- Die Bärenwiese. 1969.
- Liebeslieder. 1969.
- Bilderbuch meiner Jugend. Erinnerungen. 2 Bände (1970).
- Paul Hensel. Der Sokrates von Erlangen. Bouvier, Bonn 1972.
- Das Selbstbewußtsein. Bouvier, Bonn 1972.
- Paraphilosophika. Gesammelte Dichtungen. Scherpe, Krefeld 1974.
- Einführung in das Philosophieren. Bouvier, Bonn 1974.

== See also ==
- Denazification

== Literature ==
- Christian Tilitzki: Die deutsche Universitätsphilosophie in der Weimarer Republik und im Dritten Reich. 1. Band, Akademie Verlag, Berlin 2001. Rezension
- Ernst Klee: Das Personenlexikon zum Dritten Reich. Wer war was vor und nach 1945? S. Fischer. Frankfurt am Main 2003. ISBN 3-596-16048-0.
