= Metabasis paradox =

Apparent contradiction in Aristotle's Poetics

The metabasis paradox is an instance in Aristotle's Poetics where, according to many scholars, he makes two incompatible statements. In chapter 13 of the book, Aristotle states that for tragedy to end in misfortune is "correct," yet in chapter 14 he judges a type of plot in tragedy "best" that does not end in misfortune. Since the 16th century, scholars in Classics have puzzled over this contradiction or have proposed solutions, of which there are at least three from the 21st century alone. Gotthold Lessing's solution has been the most influential yet there is not a consensus.

In chapter 13, Aristotle argues that tragedy should consist of a change of fortune from good to bad. Subsequently, he writes also in chapter 13 that, while critics have judged Euripides harshly because "many" of his plays "end in misfortune," yet "this is, as we have seen, correct," referring to the change of fortune from good to bad. Then, in chapter 14, he identifies the incident that creates fear and pity, killing "among family," in which the killer could either kill or not, and either knowingly or unknowingly. Aristotle finds that in the "best" version, the killer recognizes the victim and does not kill. Since that narrative does not end in misfortune, scholars often conclude that chapter 14 seems to contradict 13.

In 2016, Arata Takeda published a chapter-length study of the problem from the Renaissance up to the late 20th century, omitting 21st century work. Takeda's 2016 chapter deviated from the standard description of the solutions of André Dacier, Gotthold Lessing, and Stephen Halliwell. In 2025, however, Takeda published in German a comprehensive history of the problem from the Renaissance to the 21st century, following up on his earlier work.

In Takeda's 2016 publication he proposed a name for the problem, "metabasis paradox," from metabasis, "change," Aristotle's term in the Poetics for change of fortune. The creator of this Wikipedia article borrowed the name from Takeda. The phrase has never yet been adopted by professional classical scholars for the contradiction of chapters 13 and 14. For a brief time in the early 2020s as this article was noticed online, the name was misappropriated for other paradoxes concerning tragic guilt in the Poetics. Those misuses have faded from view as of 2026. In his 2025 book, Takeda suggested instead the clearer term, Glückswechselparadox (change of fortune paradox).

== Context of the problem ==
In chapter 13, Aristotle discusses what combination of change of fortune, or μετάβασις (metabasis) and character will create fear and pity, which turns out to involve a change of fortune from good to bad. He first rules out all scenarios involving a totally good or totally bad man. Omitting the good man passing from bad to good fortune, he evaluates (1) the wholly good man changing from good to bad fortune (Poetics 1452b34-5), (2) the wholly bad man changing from bad to good fortune (1452b37), and (3) the wholly bad man changing from good to bad fortune (1453a1). Aristotle finds that none of these three creates both fear and pity, and instead, the tragic hero should be ethically like the average person—not completely good or bad but a mean between the two (1453a7), and suffer a change of fortune from good to bad (1453a15). He describes misfortune in tragedy, δυστυχία (dustuchia "adversity, misfortune") as "to suffer or inflict terrible disasters" (1453a21), Aristotle then mentions that "so many" of Euripides's "plays end in misfortune." And he notes that he has just previously shown—"as was said"—that this kind of ending is "ὀρθόν" (orthon "correct") (1453a26).

In chapter 14, Aristotle considers the most "dreadful or rather pitiable" deed, "when for instance brother kills brother, or son father, or mother son, or son mother—either kills or intends to kill, or does something of the kind, that is what we must look for" (1453b20-21).

Aristotle notes four ways this incident may be treated. After naming them, he ranks them:

The worst of these is to intend the action with full knowledge and not to perform it. That outrages the feelings and is not tragic, for there is no calamity. So nobody does that, except occasionally, as, for instance, Haemon and Creon in the Antigone. Next comes the doing of the deed. It is better to act in ignorance and discover afterwards. Our feelings are not outraged and the discovery is startling. Best of all is the last; in the Cresphontes, for instance, Merope intends to kill her son and does not kill him but discovers; and in the Iphigeneia the case of the sister and brother; and in the Helle the son discovers just as he is on the point of giving up his mother (1453b37-54a8).

Killing averted by recognition is considered incompatible with chapter 13's claim that it is "correct" for tragedy to "end in misfortune."

== Solutions ==
=== Piero Vettori ===
Vettori did not try to solve the problem but was first to publish about it, in his Latin commentary on the Poetics in 1560. André Dacier wrote more than a century later, as though unaware of Castelvetro's remarks on the problem, "The wise Victorius [Vettori] is the only one who has seen it; but since he did not know what was the concern in the Chapter, and that it is only by this that it can be solved, he has not attempted to clarify it."

=== Lodovico Castelvetro ===
Castelvetro engaged the problem in his translation and commentary of 1570. He held that Aristotle rightly established ending in misfortune in chapter 13, and wrongly broke this rule in chapter 14, praising as best a kind of tragedy that, as Castelvetro put it, lacks "passion." Castelvetro proposed that a laudable action must involve passion: "[B]y passione Castelvetro meant pathos, that is, suffering, not emotion--and more laudable is such action as involves more passion". And although for Castelvetro killing and recognizing later is no less ethical than killing averted by recognition, in the former the "passion is full and accomplished (piena e auenuta)," whereas in killing averted by recognition passion is "short and threatened (sciema e minacciata)."

=== André Dacier ===
In commentary accompanying his 1692 French edition of the Poetics, Dacier made the first known attempt to resolve the contradiction. As scholars normally understand Dacier, his theory was that Aristotle called Euripides' plays ending in misfortune "correct" because authoritative, traditional versions of these stories end in misfortune. Dacier believed that, in chapter 14, Aristotle considered stories that are open to change, hence the option of avoiding a death. As Dacier understood him, Aristotle meant that if the killing within family cannot be avoided, then the playwright moves to the next best, and so on. Dacier also shifted Aristotle's numbering by one. The altered numbering is (1) killing knowingly (third best), (2) killing and recognizing later (second best), (3) killing averted by recognition (best), and (4) failing to kill while knowing (worst).

Thus Astydamas used the second, when he brought Alcmaeon on the stage, who killed Eriphyle. He did not follow the first manner, as Aeschylus did in his Choephoroi, and Sophocles and Euripides in Electra. He chose the second, because the certainty of Eriphyle's death did not allow him to choose the third. But Euripides chose the third in his Cresphontes, as the uncertain tradition of Merope's action gave him the liberty to choose which he pleased.

=== Gotthold Lessing ===
Lessing responded to Dacier in one of his books, the Hamburg Dramaturgy. He maintained that Aristotle's preference for ending in misfortune was not relative to tradition. In Lessing's view, Aristotle meant that it is simply always better for tragedy to end in misfortune.

Lessing's own solution is that in chapter 13 Aristotle establishes the best plot structure, and in 14 the best treatment of pathos, or scene of suffering. Lessing claimed that, regardless of Aristotle judging it "best," the scene where death is prevented could occur well before the end of a play. He proposed that this removes Aristotle's contradiction, because to use this kind of incident may leave the drama open to ending in good or bad fortune, at least in theory. Lessing wrote that "Change of fortune may occur in the middle of the play, and even if it continues thus to the end of the piece, it does not therefore constitute its end." He acknowledged the difficulty of ending in misfortune or death after it has been prevented. Yet he believed it was possible, combining the best pathos and best ending, which D.W. Lucas considered somewhat implausible. Lessing's solution has been the most influential, at least historically. Notable scholars have endorsed the idea during the 19th and 20th centuries, including Gustav Teichmüller, Johannes Vahlen, Daniel de Montmollin (not to be confused with Daniel de Montmollin), Gerald Else (crediting Vahlen), and D.W. Lucas.

Ingram Bywater was not persuaded by Lessing on this issue, and instead, he believed Aristotle had changed his mind. Bywater thought that in chapter 14 Aristotle became more concerned with avoiding what is shocking, and that he ultimately regarded the act of killing followed by recognition to be shocking. According to Bywater, this is why the fourth way, "where a timely Discovery saves us from the rude shock to our moral feelings...is pronounced to be κράτιστον." Bywater wrote:

In chap. 13 Aristotle was thinking only of the emotional effect of tragedy as produced by the most obvious means; he comes to see that the same effect may be produced in a finer form without their aid. It is his somewhat tardy recognition of the necessity of avoiding τὸ μιαρόν that has caused this change of view.

John Moles also believed that the contradiction was due to a change of mind, as many secondary sources on Moles note. Moles wrote that "once Aristotle had embarked on his more detailed comparison of the different ways of handling the πάθος, he was induced to change his preference because at that particular point his more detailed approach necessarily involved taking a more restricted perspective."

=== Stephen Halliwell ===
Halliwell maintains that Aristotle did not change his mind, and that neither is Lessing's view satisfactory. Halliwell suggests the contradiction is not to be avoided, and instead finds that Aristotle is torn between two commitments, in chapter 13 the "tragic vision of the poets" and in chapter 14 an ethical view against any inexplicable, undeserved misfortune. Halliwell also argues that for Aristotle the change of fortune from good to bad is more important than ending in misfortune, and he further attempts to explain Aristotle's choice in chapter 14. He claims that, for Aristotle, misfortune has tragic meaning only if it is avoidable and intelligible, and that recognizing before killing, among the four ways, best meets these criteria. In his interpretation of Halliwell, Takeda believed the main point is that Aristotle had emphasized process over ending in misfortune. Others describe Halliwell's view as concerned with Aristotle's ethics as a criterion of tragedy.

=== Sheila Murnaghan ===
Murnaghan titled her essay on the problem "sucking the juice without biting the rind," borrowing Gerald Else's phrase characterizing the averted death theme. Murnaghan argues that, instead of a problem to be solved, Aristotle's contradiction expresses the ambivalence of many observers toward tragedy's violence. She finds that the death-avoiding incident Aristotle prefers reflects the essence of theater, since both allow us to confront death safely. Murnaghan also proposes that theater is ethically ambiguous, since although unreal it may encourage violence and desensitize the viewer. She compares the theme of escape from death with philosophy's dispassionate, distanced view of art, and with Aristotle's catharsis, since theories of catharsis often understand tragedy as a homeopathic cure.

=== Elsa Bouchard ===
Through a close reading of Aristotle's expression of the two contrary opinions, Bouchard proposes that they refer to different types of audience. In Bouchard's view, the preference for misfortune in chapter 13 reflects the domain of the literary critic, while the judgment that killing averted by recognition is "best," "kratiston," is linked to the popular audience. Bouchard acknowledges that both these types enjoyed viewing drama in the theatre at Athens, but she contends that the more intellectual type would have sought less "comfort" in a story's ending, and would even prefer an unhappy ending. As evidence, she notes that "kratiston," "strong," may be the counterpart of the emotionally "weak" popular audience that Aristotle references in chapter 13 in describing the popularity of double plots, in which the good are rewarded and the bad punished. In contrast, the context Aristotle gives (in Bouchard's translation) to the arguments for change of fortune from good to bad, is more intellectual--"the most beautiful tragedy according to art."

=== Malcolm Heath ===
Another 21st century view holds that Aristotle did not mean that "ending in misfortune is correct" absolutely, and instead that he privileges this type of ending because it avoids the inferior "double plot" of a more melodramatic type of tragedy. This solution is put forth by the classicist Malcolm Heath (not to be confused with the English cricketer Malcolm Heath). Toward the end of Poetics chapter 13, Aristotle mentions that Euripides stands out among tragedians because "so many of his tragedies end in misfortune." Aristotle then states that "this is, as was earlier said, correct" (1453a25-26). Malcolm Heath finds that this praise of ending in misfortune is meant to justify a single plot over a double one. As Elsa Bouchard writes, "According to Heath, the prescriptions of chapter 13 are to be understood as essentially preliminary and polemic: they are above all intended to refute the partisans of the double plot," i.e., the plot in which a good man is saved and a bad man is punished or dies. In other words, as Heath explains, ending in misfortune means the ending has only one quality, fitting one individual. Consequently, according to Heath, the contradiction between chapters 13 and 14 is removed. Bouchard also accounts for Heath's explanation of chapter 14: "The reason Heath gives to explain [the] preference rests on the idea of technical purity: plays like Iphigenia in Tauris are devoid of acts of violence (pathos) and thus of the kind of sensational spectacle that Aristotle condemns at the beginning of chapter 14: 'Reliance on visual effect therefore becomes impossible in a plot of averted violence: the poet has to rely on the structure of the plot to achieve tragic effect.'"
