= Mythos (Aristotle) =

Term used by Aristotle for the plot of an Athenian tragedy

Mythos [from Ancient Greek μῦθος mûthos] is the term used by Aristotle in his Poetics (c. 335 BCE) to mean an Athenian tragedy's plot as a "representation of an action" or "the arrangement of the incidents" that "represents the action". Aristotle distinguishes plot from praxis – which are the actions the plots represent. It is the first of the six elements of tragedy that Aristotle lists.

== Variations on plot ==
According to Elizabeth S. Belfiore, in "Chapter five; Parts and Wholes" of her book, Tragic Pleasures: Aristotle on Plot and Emotion:

"In Poetics 13 and 14, Aristotle turns from the discussion of the three separate parts of the plot to a consideration of the plot as a whole composed of these three parts. Aristotle begins Poetics 13 with the premise that the function of tragedy is the arousal of pity and fear.”

According to Belfiore, even though Aristotle "uses one set of criteria for good plots in Poetics 13 and a different set in Poetics 14, these two accounts are more consistent with one another than is often thought”.

Aristotle in chapter 13 of Poetics “gives a list of the possible combinations” of what Belfiore refers to "change types" and "character types". Belfiore continues,

"Since a tragic plot is a movement or change ... between the end points of good and bad fortune, there are two possible kinds of change that which begins in good fortune and ends in bad fortune, and that which begins in bad fortune and ends in good fortune. Three possible 'character types' ... are the characters of 'decent' ... people, people 'outstanding in excellence and justice' ... 'evil people' ... and the 'in-between man'."

Belifiore continues, "Although there are in fact six logically possible combinations, Aristotle lists only four combinations in Poetics 13." According to Belifiore, of the six combinations, Aristotle considers that "the best tragedy according to [the principles of] craft" is when "An in-between person changes from good to bad fortune, because of hamartia, 'error.' " Additionally, according to Belifiore, Aristotle states that the combination in which "An evil person changes from bad to good fortune ... is the most untragic of all, for it is not philanthropic, pitiable, or fearful."

According to Belfiore Poetics 13 deals with "good and bad combinations of change and character types, and Poetics 14 discusses good and bad combinations of a pathos with the knowledge or ignorance of the agent." From Aristotle’s examples of "pathos occurring/pathos about to occur but not occurring, and knowledge/ignorance" Belfiore derives a list of "four logical possibilities", and "lists them in the order in which Aristotle ranks them, from worst to best:

1. A pathos is about to occur, with knowledge, but does not occur.

2. A pathos occurs, with knowledge.

3. A pathos occurs, in ignorance.

4. A pathos is about to occur, in ignorance, but does not occur".

== Aristotle's mythos and the modern interpretations of plot ==
Aristotle’s Poetics is concerned specifically with Ancient Greek Tragedy, and that modern theorizing about plot includes other forms – for example films, novels, short stories, and so on. According to Elizabeth Belfiore’s "Narratological Plots and Aristotle's Mythos", Aristotle believed that "plot is essential to tragedy, ethos [character] is second to plot", and that "psychological and ethical considerations are secondary to the events themselves". Regarding his view that emphasizes plot above character, Aristotle notes, "Tragedy is imitation not of human beings, but of actions and of a life." To show the difference between plot and character, he uses a metaphor that compares a plot to a sketched outline, and character to the colors that flesh out the sketch. According to Meir Sternberg, Aristotle's model "restricts the well-made epic or play to a 'whole' (holos) action, with 'beginning, middle, and end' linked throughout by necessary or probable sequence, so that nothing will follow its cutoff point." According to Belifiore, "Aristotle’s relegation of êthos to a secondary role and his complete lack of interest in 'theme' rule out a focus on conflict either in the sense of struggle within a person or in the sense of the clashing of opposed principles".

German idealist philosopher Hegel believed that tragedy consists of a conflict between two positions, both equally justified, and both wrong – in that they don’t see the justification of the other position, and must negate or damage the other to assert their own character. The only resolution is the death of the hero. According to Meir Sternberg, "Modernism is notorious for its turn ... toward the open ending, and poststructuralism for preaching endless indeterminacy". Sternberg asserts that Aristotle’s model "restricts ... the locus of well-formedness – and well-formed ending/closure in particular – to the level of the event-sequence."

Belfiore quotes Peter Brook suggesting that modern understanding of narration has merely a "quasi-Aristotelian sense of plot." She points out that Vladimir Propp "reverses Aristotle's theory that 'tragedy is imitation not of human beings but of actions,' by writing that stories are about characters who act". Belifiore says that, according to the translations she has read of Propp, "many of his functions [basic story elements] are in fact ethically colored, either in themselves or because they are defined in terms of a character who has specific ethical qualities".

== Sources ==
- Aristotle, Poetics. Perseus Digital Library
- The Poetics of Aristotle at Project Gutenberg
- Rizzoli, Renato. Representation and Ideology in Jacobean Drama; The Politics of the Coup De Theatre. New York: Edwin Mellen Press, 1999
- Aristotle, W. Rhys Roberts, and Ingram Bywater. The Rhetoric and Poetics of Aristotle. New York: The Modern Library, 1984
- Eggs, Ekkehard. Doxa in Poetry: a Study of Aristotle's Poetics. Poetics Today 23 (2002)
- Belfiore, Elizabeth S. Tragic Pleasures: Aristotle on Plot and Emotion. New Jersey: Princeton University Press, 1992
- Belfiore, Elizabeth. Narratological Plots and Aristotle's Mythos. Arethusa 33 (2000)
- Sternberg, Meir. Universals of Narrative and Their Cognitivist Fortunes (II). Poetics Today 24 (2003)
- Roche, Mark W. "Introduction to Hegel's Theory of Tragedy". PhaenEx Vol 1, No 2, 2006.
