= John D'Arms =

American historian

John Haughton D'Arms
- Born: November 27, 1934; Poughkeepsie, New York
- Died: January 22, 2002 (aged 67); New York, New York
- Education: Princeton University, Harvard University
- Spouse: Maria Teresa Waugh

John Haughton D'Arms (November 27, 1934 – January 22, 2002) was the Gerald F. Else Professor of Humanities and professor of classical studies and history at the University of Michigan in Ann Arbor. He also served as president of the American Council of Learned Societies (ACLS). He served ACLS until his death in 2002. He died of brain cancer in New York City.

A University of Michigan faculty member beginning in 1965, D'Arms served as chair of the Department of Classical Studies for nine years, and was named the Gerald F. Else Professor in 1983. He received Michigan's Distinguished Faculty Achievement Award in 1982 and was also named professor of history in 1986. D'Arms was appointed as dean of the graduate school in 1985 and he also served as vice provost for academic affairs in 1990–95. In 1977–80, he was director of the American Academy in Rome and the A.W. Mellon Professor in its School of Classical Studies. D'Arms was a spokesman for the humanities at a national level, as a former member of the Board of Directors of the ACLS, trustee of the National Humanities Center, trustee emeritus of the American Academy in Rome, and member of the national Committee for Mellon Fellowships in the Humanities. In 1992, D' Arms was elected to the American Academy of Arts and Sciences. President Bill Clinton appointed D'Arms to the National Council on the Humanities in 1994. In 1998, he became a member of the American Philosophical Society. As president of ACLS, D'Arms initiated and oversaw a $3-million, 5-year grant from The Andrew W. Mellon Foundation to initiate The History E-Book Project.

Born in Poughkeepsie, New York, D'Arms was married to Maria Teresa Waugh, daughter of novelist Evelyn Waugh, in 1961 in Somerset, England. He received his undergraduate degree from Princeton University in 1956 and in 1959 received a B.A. degree in Literae Humaniores from New College, Oxford. D'Arms went on to complete a Ph.D. in classical philology at Harvard University in 1965 with a dissertation entitled Republican Roman Villas in Coastal Campania.

D'Arms's scholarly work focused on aspects of ancient Roman cities, culture and society. His works include Romans on the Bay of Naples (1970), Commerce and Social Standing in Ancient Rome (1981), and more than sixty scholarly articles and reviews. At the time of his death, he was working on a study of the social and cultural conventions concerning food and drink in Roman society.

== Publications ==
1. [dissertation] 1965. Republican Roman villas in coastal Campania. Thesis (Ph.D.), Harvard University.
2. 1970. Romans on the Bay of Naples; a social and cultural study of the villas and their owners from 150 B.C. to A.D. 400. Cambridge: Harvard University Press.
3. Gerald Frank Else, J. H. D'Arms, and John William Eadie. 1977. Ancient and modern: essays in honor of Gerald F. Else. Ann Arbor, Mich. : Center for Coördination of Ancient and Modern Studies.
4. J. H. D'Arms and E. C. Kopff. 1980. The Seaborne commerce of ancient Rome : studies in archaeology and history. Rome: American Academy in Rome.
5. 1981. Commerce and social standing in ancient Rome. Cambridge: Harvard University Press.
6. J. H. D'Arms and N. Cantor. 2002. John H. D'Arms and the Humanities : his achievements, our future course. (ACLS Occasional Paper; 53). New York: American Council of Learned Societies.
7. J. H. D'Arms and J. F. Donahue. 2003. Roman dining: [this special issue on Roman dining is dedicated to the memory of John Haughton D'Arms, teacher, scholar, classicist, friend, 1934 - 2002] American Journal of Philology 124.2003.3 = Nr. 495. Baltimore: Johns Hopkins University Press.
8. J. H. D'Arms, André Tchernia and Fausto Zevi. 2003. Romans on the bay of Naples and other essays on Roman Campania. Bari: Edipuglia.
9. J. Andreau, J. H. D'Arms, A. G. Zevi. 2004. Ostia, Cicero, Gamala, feasts, & the economy: papers in memory of John H. D'Arms. Portsmouth RI: Journal of Roman Archaeology.
