= Lexis (Aristotle) =

Total set of all words in a language

In philosophy, lexis (from the Greek: λέξις "word") is a complete group of words in a language, vocabulary, the total set of all words in a language, and all words that have meaning or a function in grammar.

== Lexis according to Plato ==
According to Plato, lexis is the manner of speaking. Plato said that lexis can be divided into mimesis (imitation properly speaking) and diegesis (simple narrative). Gerard Genette states: "Plato's theoretical division, opposing the two pure and heterogeneous modes of narrative and imitation, within poetic diction, elicits and establishes a practical classification of genres, which includes the two distinct modes...and a mixed mode, for example the Iliad".

In the Iliad, a Greek epic written by Homer, the mixed mode is very prevalent. According to Gerald Prince, diegesis in the Iliad is the fictional storytelling associated with the fictional world and the enacting/re-telling of the story. Mimesis in the Iliad is the imitation of everyday, yet fantastical life in the ancient Greek world. Diegesis and mimesis combined represent the fullest extent of lexis; both forms of speech, narrating and re-enacting.

In conclusion, lexis is the larger overview of literature. Within lexis the two areas of differentiation of mimesis (imitation) are diegesis (narrative) and the "direct representation of the actors speaking to the public."

== Lexis according to Aristotle ==
According to Jose M. Gonzalez, "Aristotle instructs us to view of his psychology, as mediating the rhetorical task and entrusted with turning the orator's subject matter into such opinion of the listeners and gain their pistis." Pistis is the Greek word for faith and is one of the rhetorical modes of persuasion.

Gonzalez also points out that, "By invoking phantasia, lexis against the background Aristotle instructs us to view of his psychology, as mediating the rhetorical task and entrusted with turning the orator's subject matter into such opinion of the listeners and gain their pistis." Phantasia is a Greek word meaning the process by which all images are presented to us. Aristotle defines phantasia as "our desire for the mind to mediate anything not actually present to the senses with a mental image." Aristotle instructs the reader to use his or her imagination to create the fantastic, unordinary images, all the while using narrative and re-enactment to create a play either written or produced.

== Elements of rhetorical diction according to Aristotle ==
Although Aristotle at times seems to demean the art of diction or 'voice,' saying that it is not an "elevated subject of inquiry," he does go into quite a bit of detail on its importance and its proper use in rhetorical speech. Often calling it "style", he defines good style as follows: that it must be clear and avoid extremes of baseness and loftiness. Aristotle makes the cases for the importance of diction by saying that, "it is not enough to know what we ought to say; we must also say it as we ought." In an oratorical speech, one must consider not only the facts, but also how to put the facts into words and which words and, also, the "proper method of delivery". Aristotle goes on to say that only the facts in an argument should be important but that since the listeners can be swayed by diction, it must also be considered.

=== Voice ===
At the time when Aristotle wrote his treatise on Rhetoric, orators had not paid much attention to voice. They thought it was a subject only of concern to actors and poets. In The Rhetoric, Aristotle says, "proper method of delivery…affects the success of a speech greatly; but hitherto the subject has been neglected." Aristotle defined voice as controlling one's voice, using rate, volume and pitch, to convey the appropriate emotions. The manner of voice in which an idea or speech is conveyed affects not only the emotions of the audience but, also, their ability to understand this concept.

Although Aristotle gives this mention and explanation of voice, he does not go into specifics about how to produce an appropriate voice or how to convey specific tones with one's voice. This may or may not be due to his mild disdain for the topic as a whole. Modern scholars have explored voice more extensively. According to Taylor Stoehr, "voice is the pervasive reflection in written or spoken language, of an author's character, the marks by which we recognize his utterance as his.". However, just as in Aristotle's time set of specific rules or guidelines has yet been laid out for the production or interpretation of voice. Due to the vast array of elements involved in the production of voice this task would be nearly, if not entirely, impossible.

=== Language ===
Aristotle thought the language of a speech should avoid being too lofty or too crude. The speaker must use the ordinary language of everyday life. However, because people best remember what is out of the ordinary, the speaker must use some language that gives the speech an air of importance.

The elevation of the language must correlate to the elevation of the subject or, in poetry, the character that is speaking. In poetry, language and linguistic devices that convey a sense of importance are more appropriate, and should be used more often because the events of poetry are more removed from ordinary life. They are less appropriate in rhetorical speech because the topics relate more directly to ordinary things and the people who are listening to the speech. Most of all, the speaker must "give the impression of speaking naturally and not artificially." When one seems to speak with ease, the audience is more easily persuaded that the facts he is communicating are truthful.

Also, a speaker must avoid using very many "strange words, compound words, and invented words". Aristotle considered this kind of language an excessive departure from the way people normally speak. However, one acceptable departure from plain language is the use of metaphor because metaphors are used by all people in everyday conversation.

== Two forms of lexis ==
According to Aristotle, lexis, meaning the delivery of words, is the least important area of speech when in comparison to invention, arrangement and style. However, lexis is still closely looked at and broken down into two forms. The two types of lexis in rhetoric include: lexis graphike and lexis agonistike. The separate terms that describe the two forms of lexis, graphike and agonistike, have been conformed by several Latin terms. Although the words directly relate to the type of lexis, the theories of Aristotle and Plato do not compare.

Lexis graphike comes from the term zographia, meaning realistic painting, and graphe, meaning writing. Plato believes that writing and painting are one of the same. His theory proves that both do not have the capability to defend themselves through an argument, question and answer, which conveys that these forms can not prove truth. Although for Aristotle, lexis graphike is the most accurate delivery of language, which leads to his theory that proves that writing does not need to be questioned because it is already exact. Lexis agonistike however is from the term skiagraphia, meaning a rough sketch or outline of painting. Aristotle once again opposes Plato by believing that lexis agonistike does not need questions asked, but only answers. The answer refers to the use of invention given to the actor because the writing portion is only outlined.

To further understand the separate types of lexis, each type can be broken down by how the writing is prepared and delivered. Lexis graphike is the most precise style of rhetoric and strongly appeals to intelligence. The delivery of lexis graphike is designed for a careful reading from either the book or paper as opposed to a performance that leaves room for improvisation. This type of lexis is a simple, straight forward recitation rather than an elaborate presentation. Lexis graphike is most accurately written and depends the least upon the person who is delivering the speech. Lexis agonistike contradicts lexis graphike because it is typically carelessly written and meant for a full performance. The lack of attention given to the written words allows the performer to improvise. This gives the presentation a style that reflects the entertainer rather the writer.
