= Johannes Vahlen =

German classical philologist (1830–1911)

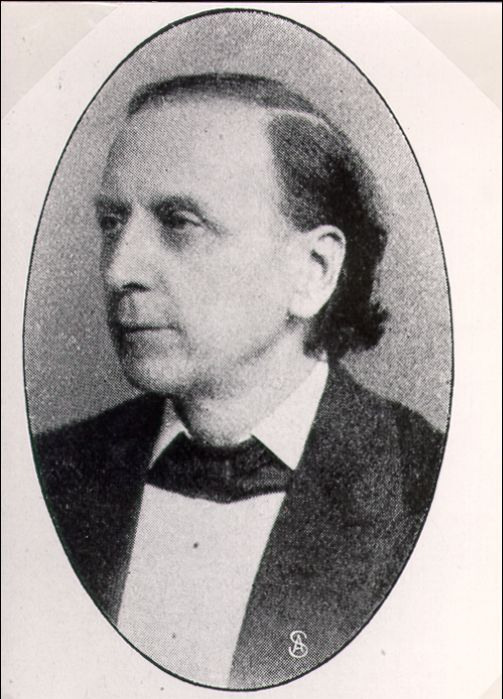
Johannes Vahlen (1830–1911)

Johannes Vahlen (27 September 1830 in Bonn – 30 November 1911 in Berlin) was a German classical philologist. He was the father of mathematician Theodor Vahlen (1869–1945).

In 1852 he graduated at the University of Bonn, where he studied classical philology. In 1856 he became an associate professor at the University of Breslau, and in 1858 a full professor at the University of Freiburg. Shortly afterwards, he relocated to Vienna, and in 1862 became a member of the Vienna Academy of Sciences. From 1874 onward, he taught classes as a professor of classical philology at the University of Berlin. He was a member of the Prussian Academy of Sciences.

Vahlen was a specialist of Greek and Latin literature, publishing works on a wide array of ancient authors that included Aristotle, Ennius, Horace, Plautus and Gnaeus Naevius. He is particularly known for his interpretive work involving the Poetics of Aristotle and the fragmentary relics of the poet Ennius; Ennianae poesis reliquiae.

In 1913 Vahlen's library of over 10,000 volumes of ancient and classical works was acquired by the University of Illinois.

== Selected publications ==
- Ennianae poesis reliquiae, (edition, 1854).
- Naevii de bello punico reliquiae, (edition 1854).
- Laurentii Vallae opuscula tria (1864).
- Beiträge zu Aristoteles' Poetik; numerous editions published between 1865 and 1965 in German.
- Aristotle: De arte poetica liber; numerous editions published between 1867 and 1964.
- Cicero: De legibus (1871).
- Opuscula academica (1908).
