= Ingram Bywater =

English writer and scholar (1840–1914)

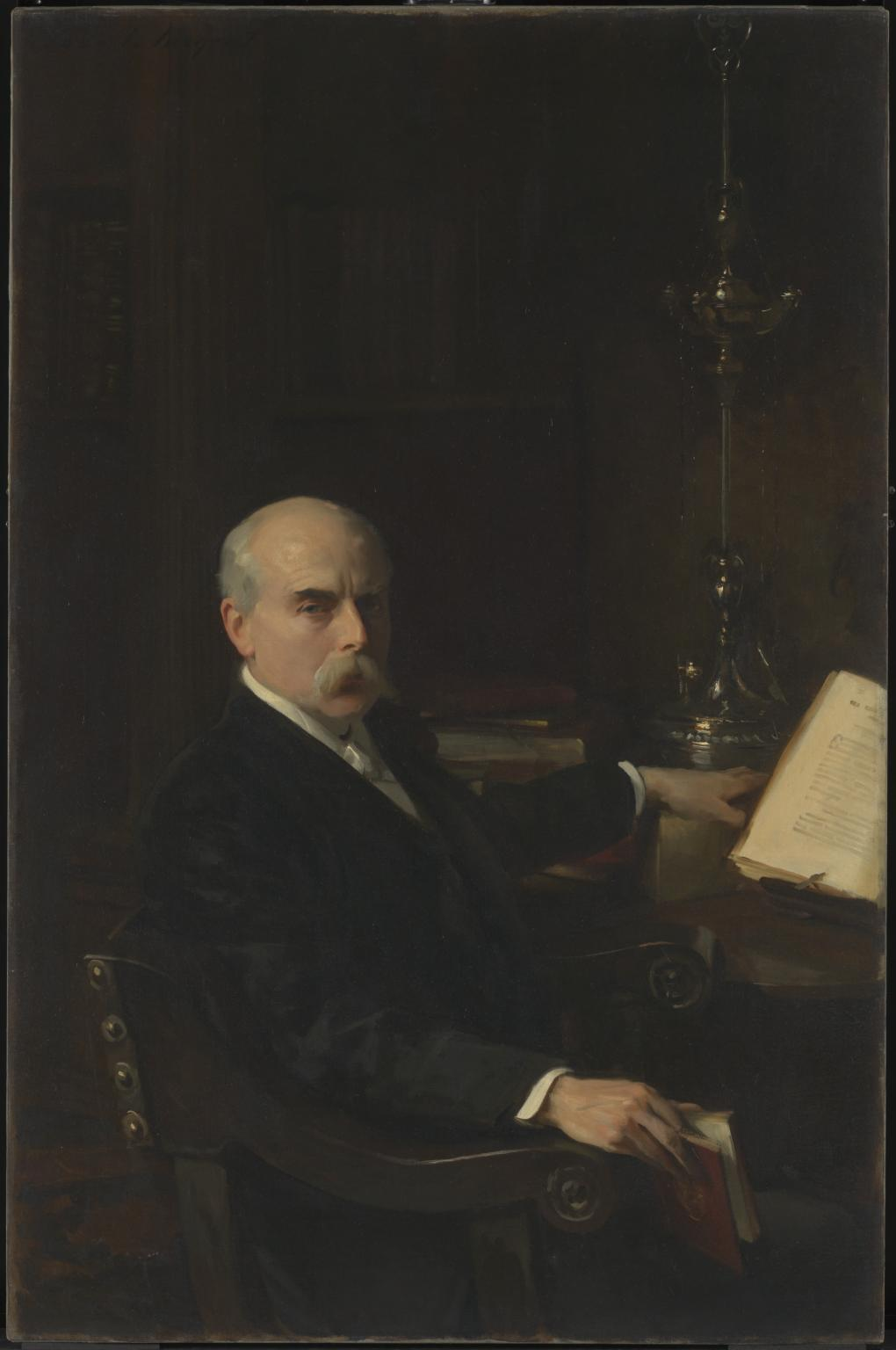
- Portrait of Ingram Bywater, 1901
- Born: 27 June 1840; London, England
- Died: 18 December 1914 (aged 74); London, England
- Occupations: Writer; scholar

Ingram Bywater, FBA (27 June 1840 – 18 December 1914) was an English writer and scholar. He was well known for his philosophical works on Aristotle, in particular Nicomachean Ethics.

== Life ==
He was born in Islington, London and first educated first at University College School and King's College School, then at Queen's College, Oxford. He obtained a first class in Moderations (1860) and in the final classical schools (1862), and became fellow of Exeter College, Oxford (1863), reader in Greek (1883), Regius Professor of Greek (1893–1908), and Student of Christ Church. He received honorary degrees from various universities, and was elected corresponding member of the Prussian Academy of Sciences.

He is chiefly known for his editions of Greek philosophical works: Heracliti Ephesii Reliquiae (1877); Prisciani Lydi quae extant (edited for the Berlin Academy in the Supplementum Aristotelicum, 1886); Aristotle, Ethica Nicomachea (1890), De Arte Poetica (1898); Contributions to the Textual Criticism of the Nicomachean Ethics (1892).

Bywater was associated with the Oxford Aristotelian Society from its inception in the early 1880s and remained its principal guiding force until his retirement in 1908. Here he would discuss with scholars such as J.A. Smith, Harold Joachim, and W.D. (later Sir David) Ross the minutiae of Aristotelian philology, textual criticism, and translation. The Society's discussions led to the full translation of Aristotle's works, first under the joint editorship of J.A. Smith and W.D. Ross and later under Ross as sole editor, between 1912 and 1954.

== Collection ==
Bywater was an expert bibliophile and bequeathed around 4,000 volumes of his collection to the Bodleian Library in Oxford in 1915. His collection illustrates the history of classical learning and contains the names of both great and obscure European humanists of the early 16th and 17th centuries, with most of the books dating before 1650. Aristotle and his commentators are also well represented in the collection. Around 50 books have MS marginalia by scholars, nearly 200 are autographed, and around 50 bear the arms of De Thou on the bindings. There are around 150 incunabula (31 of them Greek), and over 1,100 books (459 of them Greek) which were printed in the first half of the 16th century, a third of these by Parisian presses. The Bodleian Library also acquired some 64 volumes of MS material, including Bywater’s correspondence with eminent European scholars. The collection also spans numerous languages including Latin, Greek, Italian and German.

Some of the collection is available to view via the Digital Bodleian website.
