= Opsis =

Greek word for spectacle used to describe a representative scene in theatre

See also the suffix -opsis.

Opsis (Ancient Greek: ὄψις) is the Greek word for spectacle in the theatre and performance. Its first use has been traced back to Aristotle's Poetics. It is now taken up by theatre critics, historians, and theorists to describe the mise en scène of a performance or theatrical event. It is also the word used in the Bible for “sight” or “appearance”.

== Origins ==
Opsis comes from the ancient Greek for "appearance, sight, view." The English word optic is derived from this word.

== Aristotle and the Greeks ==
Aristotle's use of the term opsis, as Marvin Carlson points out, is the "final element of tragedy," but the term "receive[d] no further consideration". Aristotle discusses opsis in book 6 of the Poetics, but only goes as far as to suggest that "spectacle has, indeed, an emotional attraction of its own, but, of all the parts, it is the least artistic, and connected least with the art of poetry. For the power of Tragedy, we may be sure, is felt even apart from representation and actors. Besides, the production of spectacular effects depends more on the art of the stage machinist than on that of the poet".

== Contemporary theatre theory ==
In Theories of the Theatre by Marvin Carlson, the word opsis is replaced with the English equivalent "spectacle," but gives opsis/spectacle as much focus as Aristotle does in the Poetics; however, in Dictionary of the Theatre: Terms, Concepts, and Analysis Opsis is listed in the "terms" section, and defined as:

that which is visible, offered to the [gaze], hence its connections with the notions of spectacle and performance. In Aristotle's Poetics, spectacle is one of the six constituent parts of tragedy, but ranks below others considered to be more essential ... The place in theatre history assigned subsequently to the opsis, to what we would now call the [mise-en-scene], determined the mode of transmission and the overall meaning of the performance. Opsis is a spectific feature of the performing arts.

J. Michael Walton, in The Greek Sense of Theatre: Tragedy Reviewed, challenges the traditional assumptions about Ancient Greek theatre. He states that “the visual aspect of the Greek theatre has for so long taken second place to the spoken word...it is still the common belief that what was said in the Greek tragedies was more important than what was seen.” Walton's thesis suggests that Ancient theatre lacks evidence of original productions, but that the written text, in comparison, is more accessible, and as a result, has caused Ancient theatre critics to relegate spectacle/mise-en-sene/opsis to less important aspects of theatre than the spoken word.

Ronald W. Vince, suggests that while it may

seem logical simply to recognize opsis as stage spectacle or the mise-en-scene and so include it — if anywhere — in the vocabulary of performance theory. But there is implied even in Aristotle's use of the term a possible interpretation which would link opsis with the art of writing plays as well as with the art of staging them.
