= D. W. Lucas =

British classical scholar (1905–1985)

Donald William Lucas
- Born: 12 May 1905; London, England
- Died: 28 February 1985 (aged 79)
- Education: King's College, Cambridge
- Occupation: Academic
- Writing career
- Notable works: Aristotle, 'Poetics' (edition 1968)

Donald William Lucas (12 May 1905 – 28 February 1985) was an English classical scholar, Fellow of King's College, Cambridge, and cryptanalyst at Bletchley Park during World War II.

He is remembered for his work on Greek Drama and for his major edition of Aristotle's Poetics (Clarendon Press 1968; revised 1972). J. T. Sheppard described his prose translations of Euripides as "astonishingly eloquent for so close a rendering". From 1952 to 1969 he was the third Perceval Maitland Laurence Reader in Classics at Cambridge University.

== Education and career ==
Educated at Colfe's (1912–1919) and at Rugby, Lucas won a scholarship in 1924 to King's College, Cambridge, to read for the Classical Tripos. A prizeman there, he took a double first in 1926 and 1927. Elected Apostle in 1925, he later became Secretary of the Society, delivering eleven papers. In 1929 he was elected to a Fellowship at King's College. A descriptive sketch of Lucas at this time appears in the first volume of John Lehmann's autobiography, The Whispering Gallery (London, 1955). (Note: There are briefer references to him in Lydia and Maynard: The Letters of John Maynard Keynes and Lydia Lopokova (eds. Polly Hill and Richard Keynes, New York, 1989), p. 251, and in The Letters of T. S. Eliot (Eliot, Valerie; Haughton, Hugh; Haffenden, John: eds., London 2012), vol. 3) He was appointed College Lecturer in 1930, was University Lecturer from 1933 to 1969, and University Director of Studies in Classics from 1935 to 1965. He was co-editor of The Classical Quarterly from 1953 to 1959. His successor as Perceval Maitland Laurence Reader in Classics in 1969, the fourth and last person to hold the post, was John Chadwick, who retired in 1984.

Lucas dedicated much of his time to Greek drama. His translations facing the Greek texts appeared in acting editions of The Bacchae of Euripides (1930, 1956) and The Frogs of Aristophanes (1936, 1947) for the Cambridge Greek Play. His 1930 translation of The Bacchae, adapted for radio by Raymond Raikes, was first broadcast on the BBC Third Programme in 1949, with Carleton Hobbs, Mary Wimbush, Norman Shelley and Marjorie Westbury among the cast, and with music by Anthony Bernard; it was re-broadcast in 1951, 1957 and 1974. Lucas also gave BBC Third Programme talks on Euripides, and introduced selected readings from The Bacchae in Greek on the BBC, George Rylands being one of the performers.

== Bletchley Park ==
From 1939 to October 1944, Lucas served in the Mansion, Hut 5, and Block B(N) at Bletchley Park, till late 1943 as senior Cryptanalyst in the Italian sub-section of the Naval Section, and from late 1943 in Naval Section V, as Head of Japanese naval crypto-intelligence.

== Personal life ==
In 1933 Lucas married Mary Cohen. They lived in Grantchester, Cambridgeshire. D. W. Lucas was the brother of F. L. Lucas.

== Works ==
- 'The Bacchae' of Euripides. The Greek text as performed at Cambridge at the New Theatre, 4–8 March 1930, by members of the University, together with an English prose translation by D. W. Lucas; Prefatory Note by J. T. Sheppard (Bowes & Bowes, Cambridge, 1930)
- 'The Frogs' of Aristophanes. The Greek text as arranged for performance at Cambridge, March 1936. With an English translation by D. W. Lucas & F. J. A. [Francis Julian Alford] Cruso (Bowes & Bowes, Cambridge, 1936; reprinted 1947)
- 'The Medea' of Euripides, translated into English Prose with Introduction and Notes (Cohen & West, London, 1949)
- 'The Ion' of Euripides, translated into English Prose with Introduction and Notes (Cohen & West, London, 1949)
- 'The Electra' of Euripides, translated into English Prose with Introduction and Notes (Cohen & West, London, 1951)
- 'The Alcestis' of Euripides, translated into English Prose with Introduction and Notes (Cohen & West, London, 1951)
- 'The Agamemnon' of Aeschylus. The Greek text, performed at Cambridge by the members of the University in February 1953. With a Verse Translation by Sir John Sheppard and an Introduction by D. W. Lucas (Bowes & Bowes, Cambridge, 1952)
- 'The Bacchae' of Euripides. The Greek text performed at Cambridge at the Arts Theatre, 20–24 February 1956, by members of the University, with an English prose translation by D. W. Lucas (Bowes & Bowes, Cambridge, 1955)
- The Greek Tragic Poets (Cohen & West, London, 1950; 2nd edn., substantially revised and rewritten, 1959); a study, with notes and chronological tables
- 'Euripides' in The Oxford Classical Dictionary (Oxford University Press, Oxford 1970)
- Aristotle, 'Poetics' : Greek text, Latin apparatus, with introduction, commentary, appendices in English, & bibliography (Oxford, 1968; revised 1972; paperback 1980)
