= Gerald Else =

American classical philologist (1908–1982)

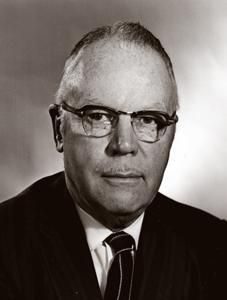
- Born: Gerald Frank Else; July 1, 1908; Redfield, South Dakota, United States
- Died: September 6, 1982 (aged 74); Chapel Hill, North Carolina, US
- Occupation: Classicist

Gerald Frank Else (July 1, 1908 – 6 September 1982) was a distinguished American classicist. He was professor of Greek and Latin at University of Michigan and University of Iowa. Else is substantially credited with the refinement of Aristotelian scholarship in aesthetics in the 20th century to expand the reading of catharsis alone to include the aesthetic triad of mimesis, hamartia, and catharsis as all essentially linked to each other.

== Biography ==
Else studied classics and philosophy at Harvard University and finished his PhD there in 1934. He taught at Harvard University until he joined the U.S. Marine Corps as a captain in 1943. After completing his service, in 1945 he became chair of the University of Iowa Classics Department. He spent 1956 to 1957 at The American Academy in Rome and in September 1957 went to the University of Michigan in Ann Arbor, where he remained for the rest of his career. He was chair of that department from 1957 to 1968. During that time he founded the Center for Coordination of Ancient and Modern Studies, seeking to unite the humanities and to show how the study of the ancient world is relevant to modern literature and modern concerns.

== Accomplishments ==
Else's magnum opus is titled, Aristotle's Poetics: The Argument. It is a meticulous, comprehensive reading of Aristotle's treatise that was published in 1957. Widely regarded in its time as a central work of literary theory, Else's other important contribution is The Origin and Early Form of Greek Tragedy, which was published in 1965. In this work he argued against the view of tragedy as having arisen from religious ritual. Else wrote several other works on Greek literature and philosophy.

Up to Else's time, Aristotle's concept of catharsis was almost exclusively associated with the reading of Jakob Bernays who defined it as the "therapeutic purgation of pity and fear." In a convincing manner, Else refined this definition to understanding literary catharsis as, "that moment of insight which arises out of the audience's climactic intellectual, emotional, and spiritual enlightenment, which for Aristotle is both the essential pleasure and essential goal of mimetic art." For Else, catharsis is an Aristotelian concept which must be read alongside the literary concepts of mimesis and hamartia as well. These latter two concepts are usually paraphrased as "literary representation" and "intellectual error" in Else's appraisal of Aristotle's literary aesthetic theory.

Else was a member of the National Council for the Humanities, appointed by President Lyndon Johnson, and was President of the American Philological Association in 1964. Else retired in 1977 and died in 1982. A Festschrift in his honor (Ancient and Modern: Essays in Honor of Gerald F. Else, ed. J. D'Arms and J. W. Eadie) was published in 1977. A volume of collected essays written by Else was edited by Peter Burian, an editor at the University of North Carolina Press, in 1987 fourteen of Else's essays titled Plato and Aristotle on Poetry. The volume is notable for the inclusion of the biography on Else by Burian included in the prefatory section of the book., pp xi-xvi. Gerald Else is commemorated at Michigan by an annual lecture in the humanities.

== Books ==
- Aristotle's Poetics: the argument. 1957
- Origin and early form of Greek tragedy. 1965
- Ancient and modern : essays in honor of Gerald F. Else. edited by John H. D'Arms, John W. Eadie. 1977
- Plato and Aristotle on poetry. Edited with introduction and notes by Peter Burian. 1986
- Aristotle Poetics. translated with an introd. and notes by Gerald F. Else.
