= Stephen Halliwell (classicist) =

British classicist and academic (born 1953)

Stephen Halliwell FBA FRSE
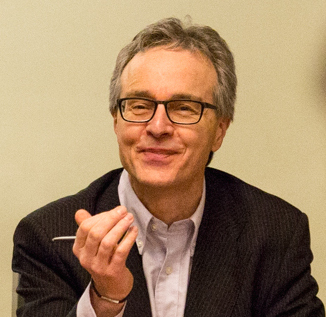
- Halliwell in 2015
- Born: Francis Stephen Halliwell; 1953 (age 72–73)

Academic background
- Education: Worcester College, Oxford

Academic work
- Discipline: Classicist
- Sub-discipline: Ancient Greek literature; Ancient Greek philosophy; Homer; Ancient Greek comedy; Aristophanes; Plato; Aristotle; Neoplatonism
- Institutions: Jesus College, Oxford; Westfield College, London; Corpus Christi College, Cambridge; University of Birmingham; University of St Andrews

Francis Stephen Halliwell, FBA, FRSE (born 1953), known as Stephen Halliwell, is a British classicist and academic. From 1995 he was Professor of Greek at the University of St Andrews and Wardlaw Professor of Classics from 2014; having retired in October 2020, he is now emeritus professor. He was President of the Classical Association for 2024-25.

== Early life and education ==
Halliwell was born in Wigan, Lancashire, England. He was educated at St Francis Xavier's College, an all-boys Catholic school in Liverpool. He studied Literae humaniores (i.e. Classics) at Worcester College, Oxford, graduating with a Bachelor of Arts (BA) degree, first class, in 1976. He remained at Oxford to undertake a Doctor of Philosophy (DPhil) degree, which he was awarded in 1981. His doctoral thesis, supervised by Sir Kenneth Dover, was titled "Personal jokes in Aristophanes".

== Academic career ==
Halliwell taught at the universities of Oxford, London, Cambridge (where he was a Fellow of Corpus Christi College), and Birmingham. He has also held visiting positions at the University of Chicago, the Center for Ideas and Society (University of California, Riverside), Roma Tre University, McMaster University (H. L. Hooker Distinguished Visiting Professor), the Université catholique de Louvain (Chaire Cardinal Mercier), and Cornell University (Townsend Visiting Professor, Department of Classics). He was elected a Fellow of the Royal Society of Edinburgh (FRSE) in 2011, and a Fellow of the British Academy (FBA) in 2014.

Although his publications cover many topics in ancient Greek literature and philosophy, from Homer to Neoplatonism, Halliwell has worked most extensively on Ancient Greek comedy, especially Aristophanes, and Greek philosophical poetics and aesthetics, especially in the writings of Plato and Aristotle. Halliwell's characteristic style of tackling large issues of cultural significance through the fine-grained interpretation of texts led David Konstan, in reviewing Between Ecstasy and Truth, to call him ‘the ideal close reader’, whose arguments are ‘detailed, learned, and nuanced’.

Two of his books have won international prizes: The Aesthetics of Mimesis, described in The Times Literary Supplement as 'formidable' and 'an outstanding example of taking ideas seriously', won the Premio Europeo di Estetica 2008; and Greek Laughter, which one reviewer called 'monumental' and 'an extraordinary resource', won the Criticos Prize (since renamed the London Hellenic Prize) 2008.

Halliwell has given two hundred invited research papers in eighteen countries. He has also made a number of appearances in broadcast media, including the BBC radio programme In Our Time. His work has been translated into nine languages.

== Personal life ==
In 1978, Halliwell married Helen Ruth Gainford. Together they had two sons. They divorced in 2010.

== Selected works ==
- Aristotle's Poetics, London and North Carolina, 1986/1998. ISBN 978-0226313948
- The Poetics of Aristotle: Translation and Commentary, London and North Carolina, 1987. ISBN 978-0715621769
- Plato Republic 10: with Translation and Commentary, Warminster, 1988. ISBN 978-0856684067
- Plato Republic 5: with Translation and Commentary, Warminster, 1993. ISBN 978-0856685361
- Aristotle Poetics, Longinus On the Sublime, Demetrius on Style, Loeb Classical Library, Cambridge Mass., 1995. ISBN 978-0674995635 [Halliwell's contribution is Aristotle's Poetics]
- Aristophanes: Birds, Lysistrata, Assembly-Women, Wealth. A New Verse Translation with Introduction and Notes, Oxford, 1997. ISBN 978-0198149934
- Aristophanes: Birds and Other Plays, Oxford World's Classics, Oxford, 1998. ISBN 978-0199555673 [= paperback of preceding item]
- The Aesthetics of Mimesis: Ancient Texts and Modern Problems, Princeton, 2002. ISBN 978-0691092584
- Greek Laughter: A Study of Cultural Psychology from Homer to Early Christianity, Cambridge, 2008. ISBN 978-0521717748
- Between Ecstasy and Truth: Interpretations of Greek Poetics from Homer to Longinus, Oxford, 2011. ISBN 978-0199570560, 978-0198707011 (pbk)
- Aristophanes: Clouds, Women at the Thesmophoria, Frogs. A Verse Translation with Introduction and Notes, Oxford, 2015. ISBN 978-0198149941
- Aristophanes: Frogs and Other Plays, Oxford World's Classics, Oxford, 2016. ISBN 978-0192824097 [= paperback of preceding item]
- Sul sublime, Milan, 2021. ISBN 978-8804738046
- Aristophanes: Acharnians, Knights, Wasps, Peace, Oxford, 2022. ISBN 978-0198149958
- Pseudo-Longinus: On the Sublime, Oxford, 2022. ISBN 978-0192894205
- Scholarship and Controversy: Centenary Essays on the Life and Work of Sir Kenneth Dover, London, 2023. Edited by Stephen Halliwell and Christopher Stray. ISBN 978-1350333451
- Aristophanes: Wasps and Other Plays, Oxford World's Classics, Oxford, 2024. ISBN 978-0198900221
