= Neckarhalde, Tübingen =

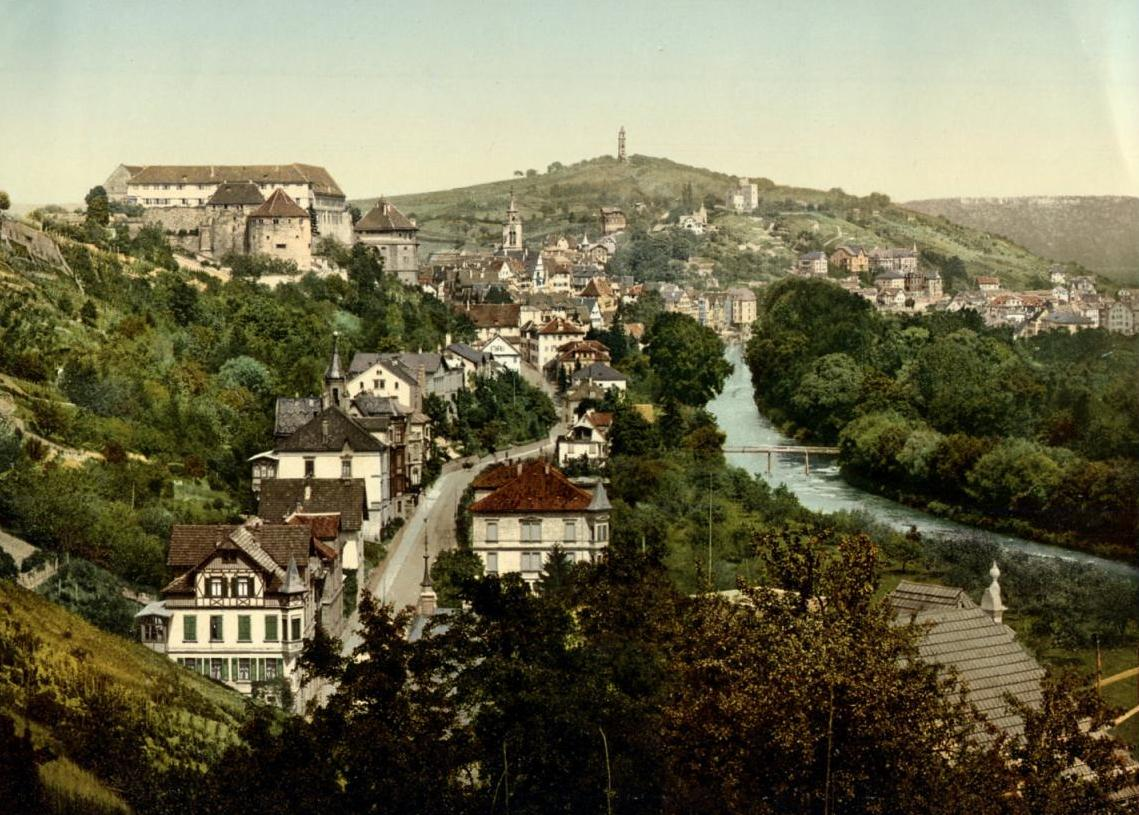
View of the Neckarhalde, in 1894

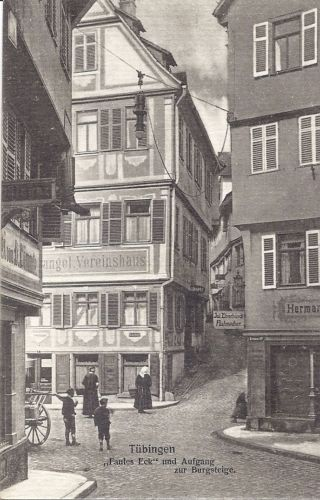
The "Faules Eck" ("Lazy Corner") around 1920

The Neckarhalde is an 841-metre (0.5 mi) road in Tübingen, Germany, on the southern slope below Hohentübingen Castle.

== Location ==
The Neckarhalde is an east–west road parallel to the Neckar river and Tübingen's city wall, starting in the old town of Tübingen. The Wienergässle links the road with the market place, where the town hall is located. Starting at the "Lazy Corner" above the Tübinger Stift, an old Protestant seminary, the road heads west down to the river and ends by meeting the Biesinger and Hirschauer roads. Apart from the more distant Mühlstraße (Mill Road), it is the only road leaving the old town to the south. Approximately halfway through the length of the road, it crosses a pedestrian and bicycle tunnel, which continues to the Avenue Bridge.

== History ==
For many years, the buildings in Neckarhalde did not have a sewage system. Building number 7, in particular, became known for its hard-to-clean privy. As described in the "Caterpillar hymn" (Raupenhymne), it was necessary as the winegrowers carried the smelly solids up the mountain to use it as fertilizer on strawberries and grapevines. All Tübingen wine growers are colloquially called "Caterpillars", even if they do not live in Lower Tübingen, while the expression "Gôgen" usually describes inhabitants of the lower city.

== Notable buildings ==
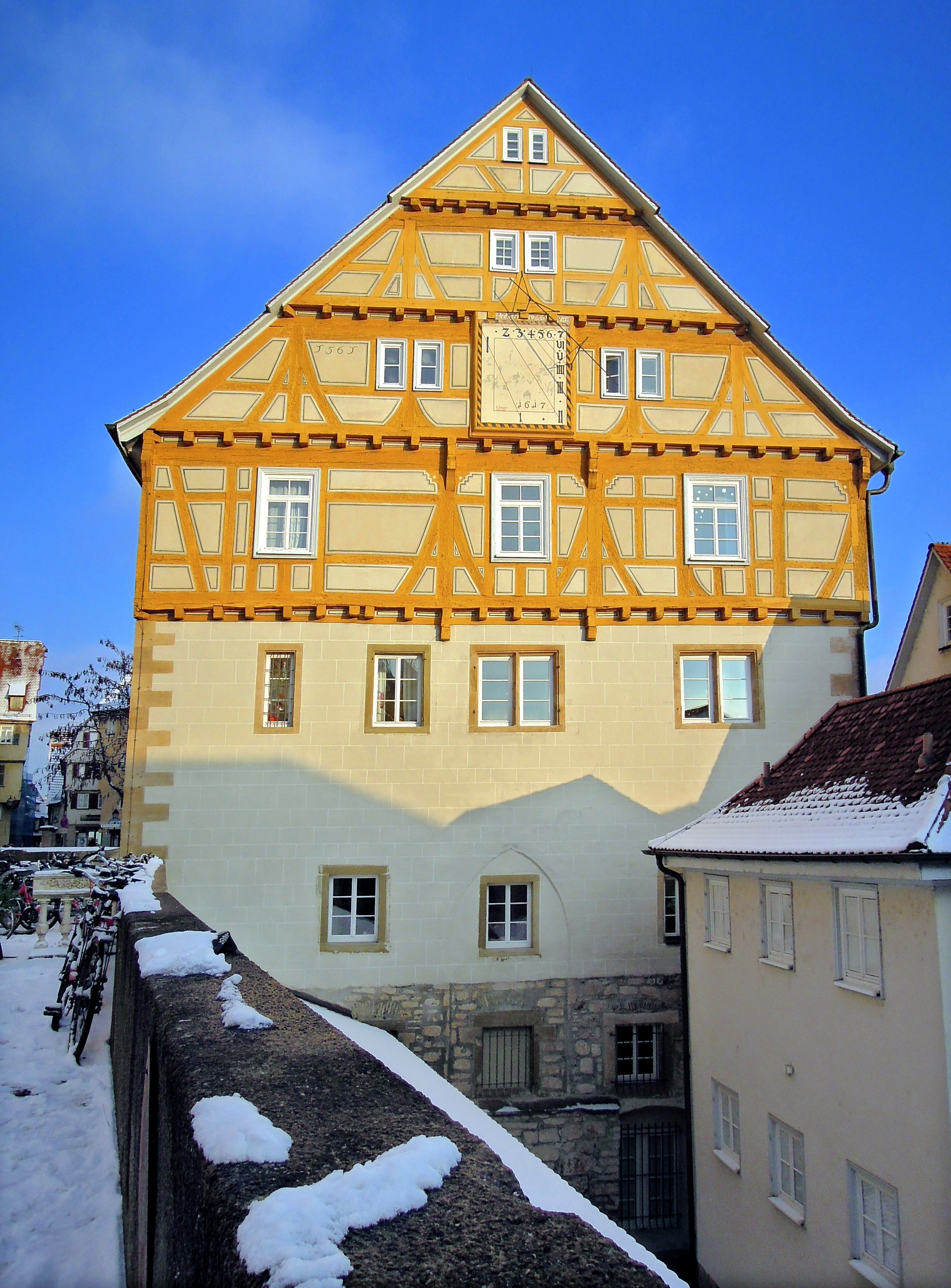
Protestant Seminary building (western part at the Neckarhalde)

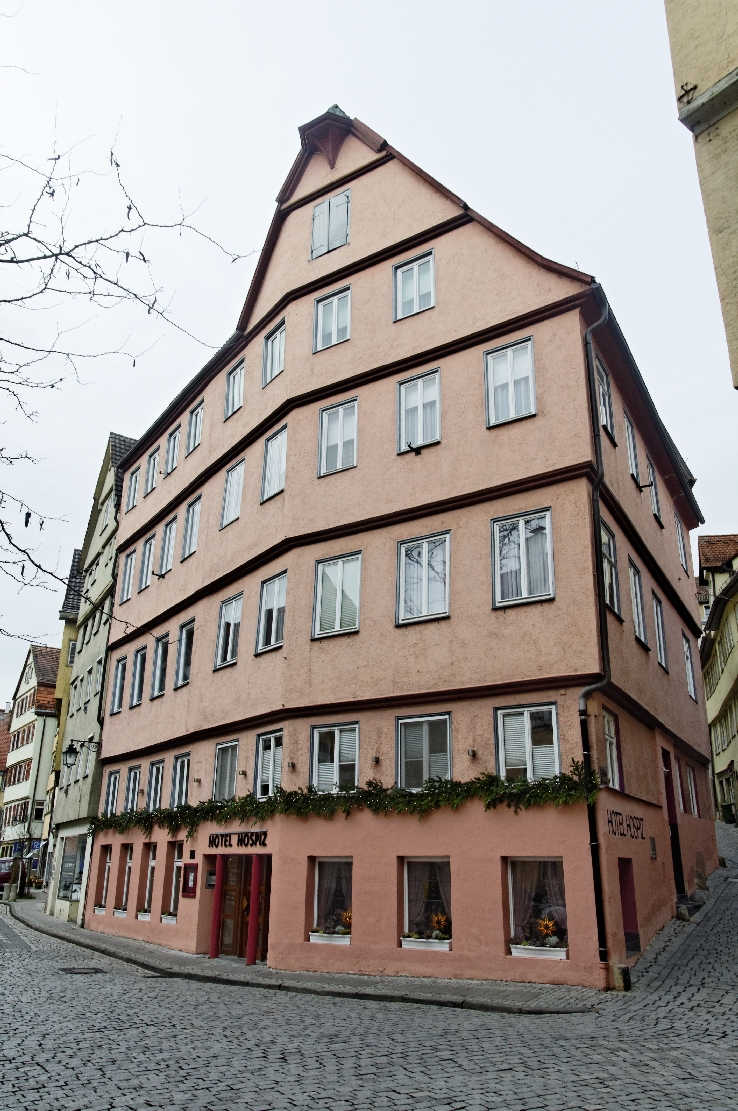
2 - Former Hotel Hospiz

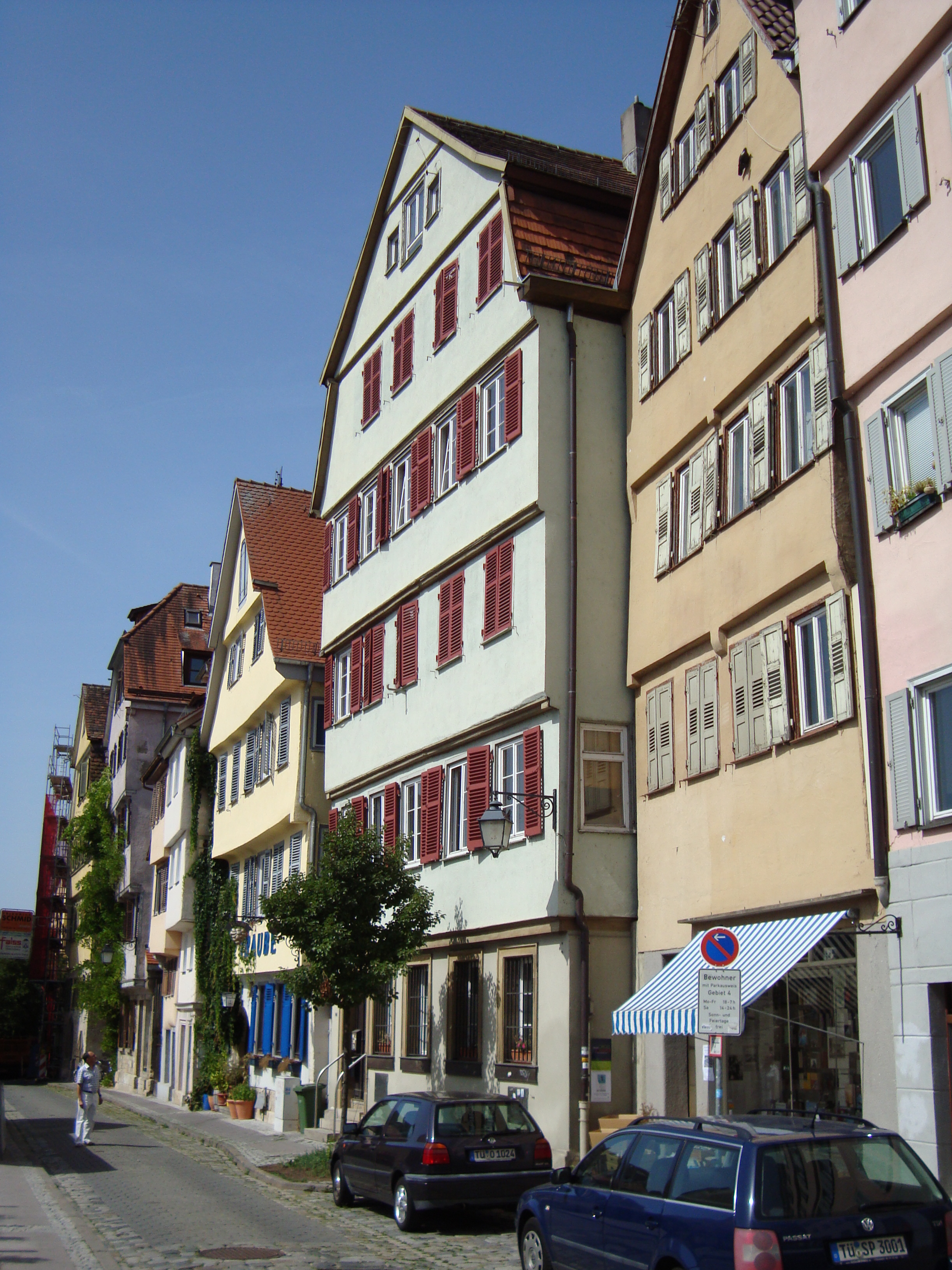
12

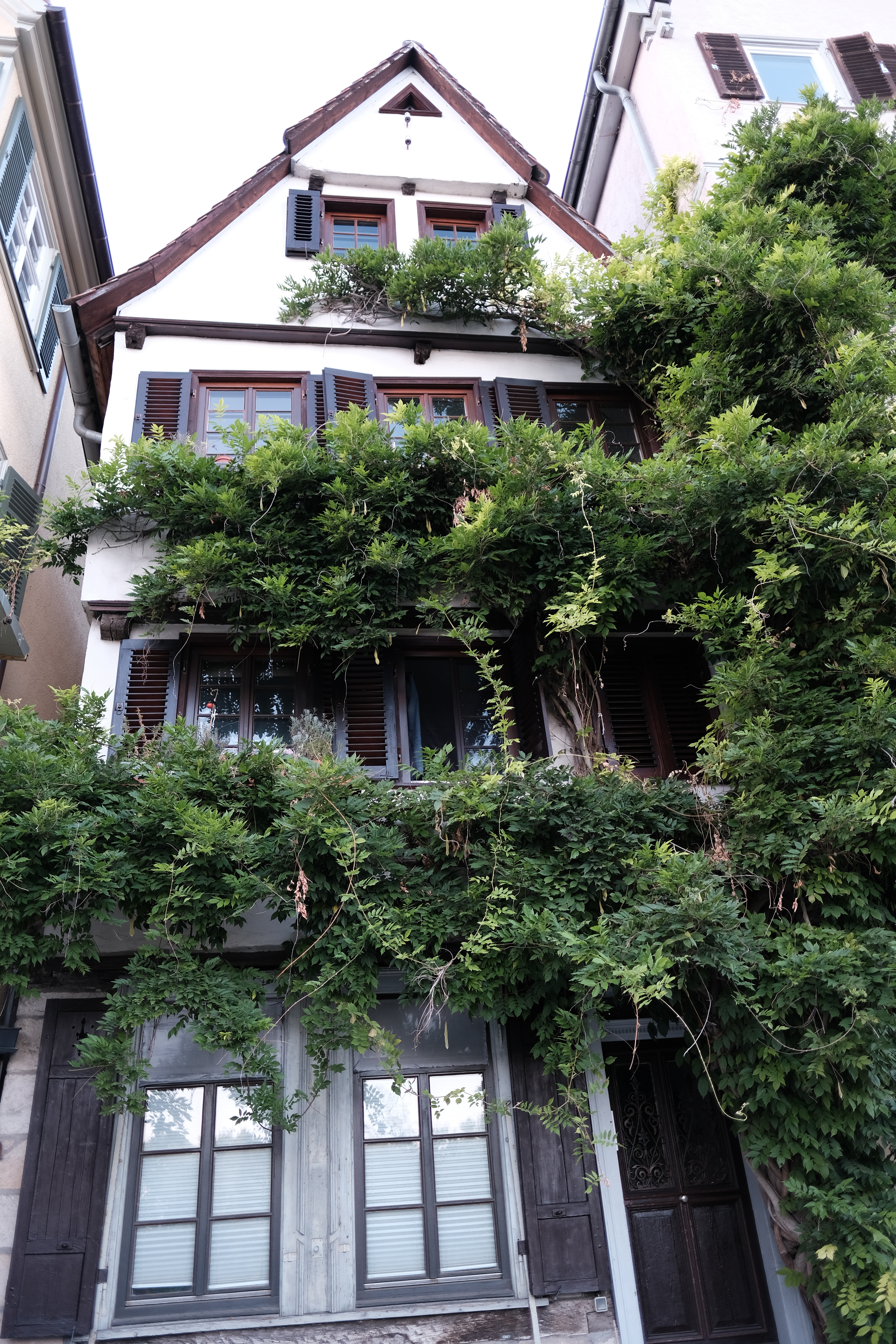
22

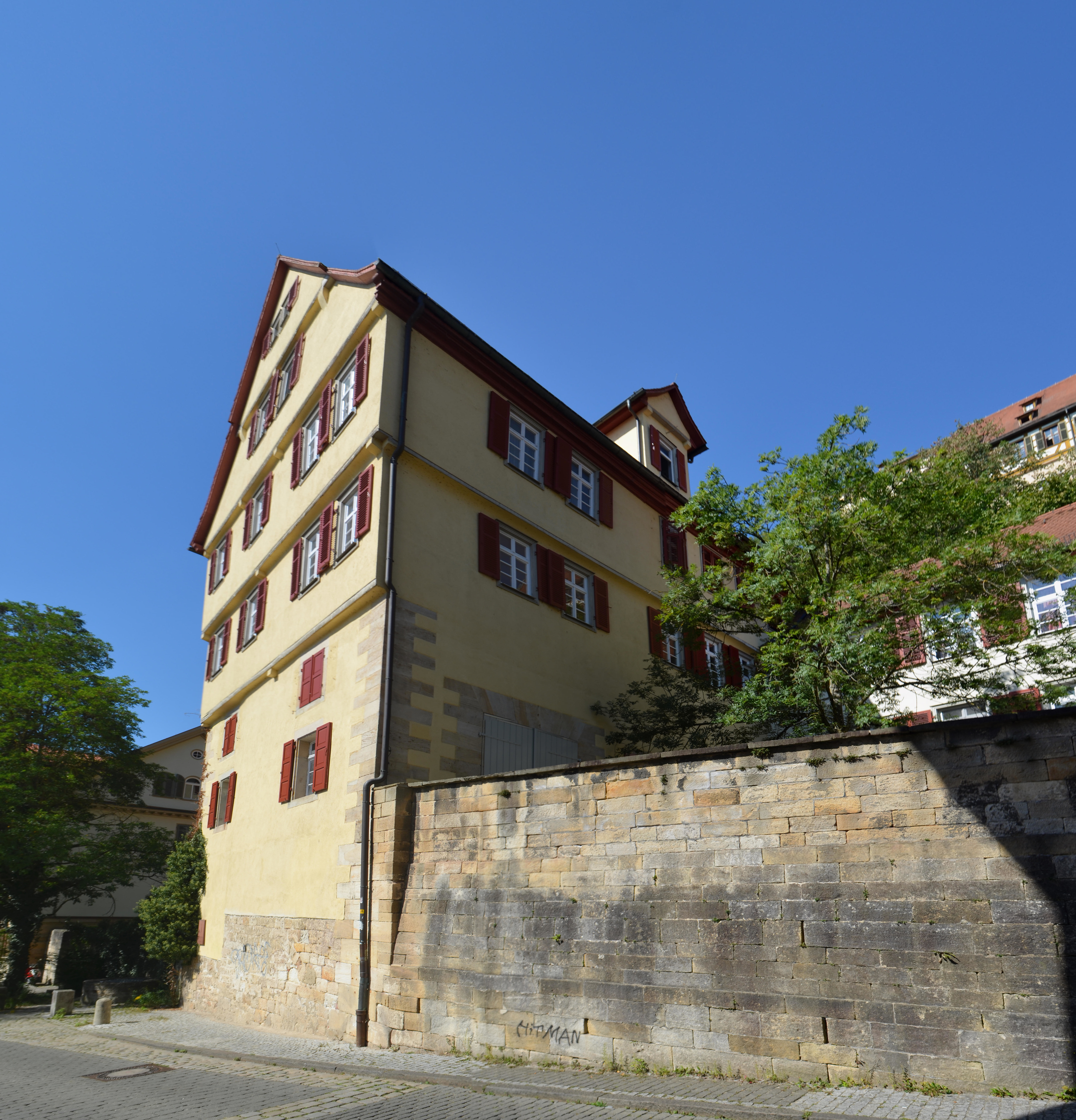
30b

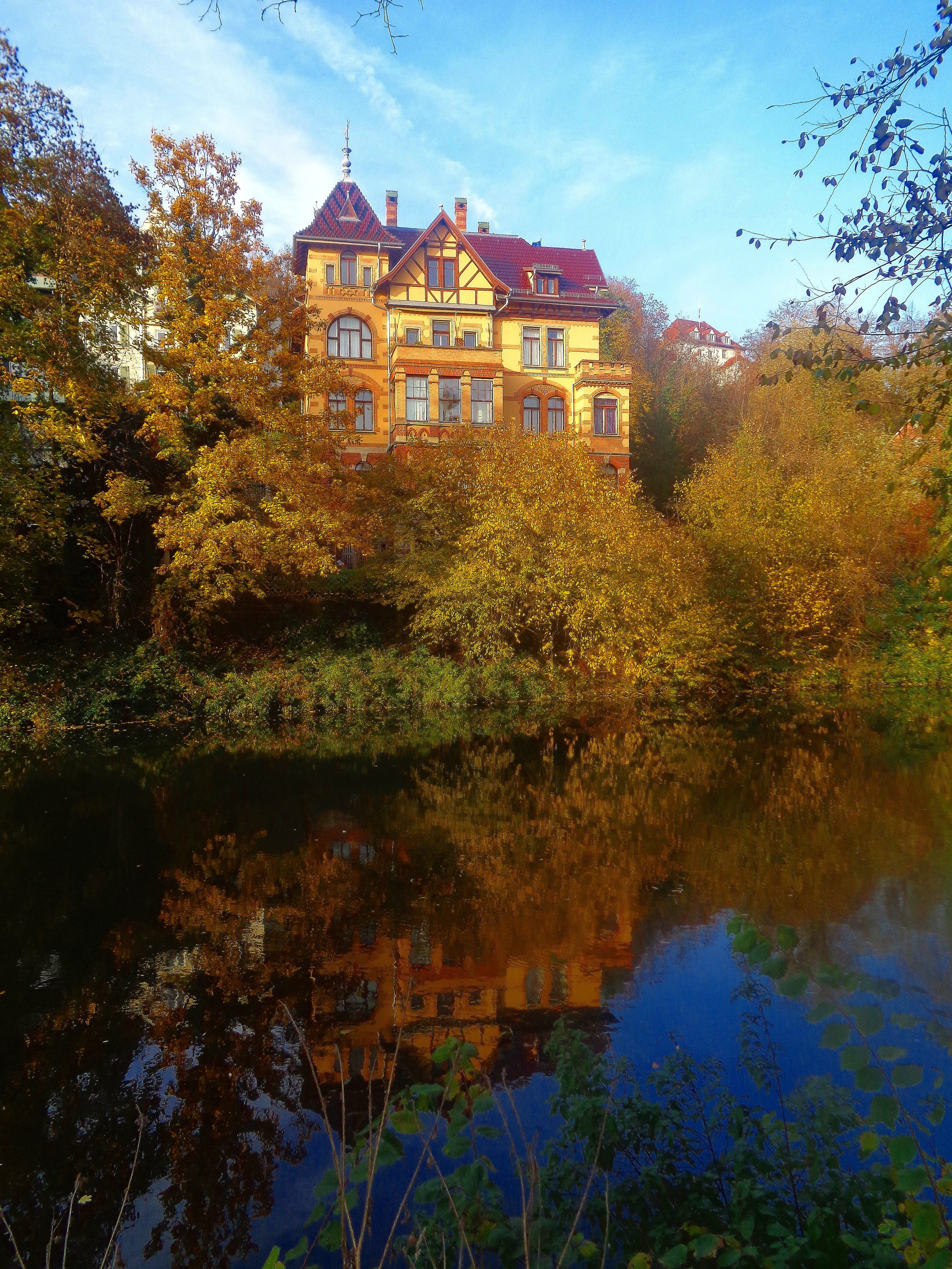
37 - Haus Neckarblick

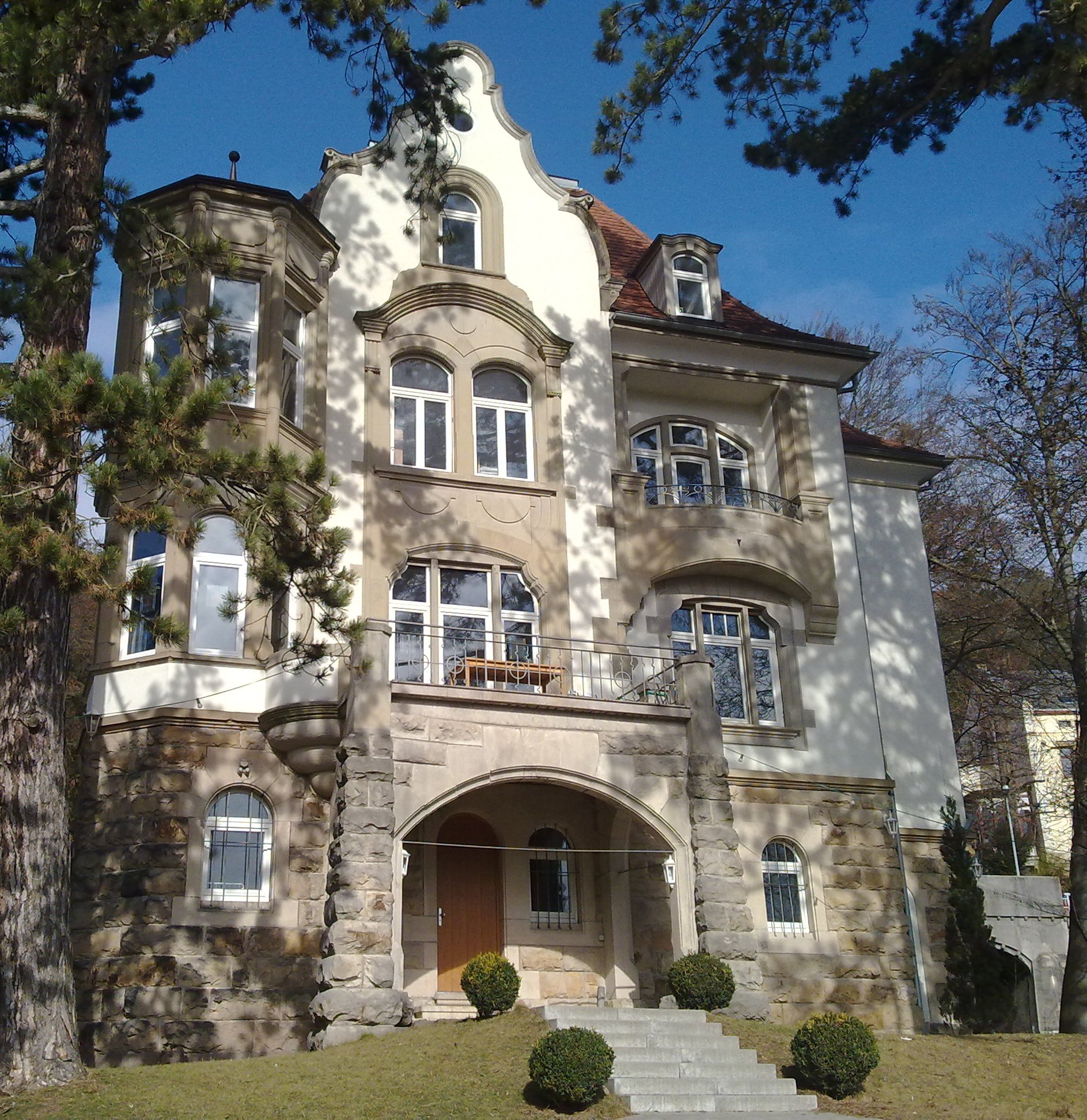
47 - Villa Vierordt (today fraternity Strassburger Germania)

The following is a list of house numbers and the notable buildings or persons associated with them.

1
Former bakery of the former Augustinian Monastery, today it is the new Ephorat of the Protestant seminary, a protected two-and-a-half– to three-floor solid building on a hillside with a mansard roof, which was rebuilt in 1779 and 1780.
2
The Hospiz Hotel was closed on 17 December 2017 due to fire protection. The church-owned building was sold to an investor. It has been restored since 2020 and converted into apartments. In the 17th century this house was the chancellery and meeting place of the imperial knights of the canton Neckar/Black Forest. Later it became a traditional hotel. This hotel was last operated for over seventy years by the Veihelmann family.
6
Across from the Protestant seminary is the former restaurant Seif. The operator of the restaurant, Ferdinand Forstbauer, was a former trained soap boiler. Later, until 1934, the location was another restaurant, Hecht, which became a brothel and closed for that reason.
8
Rudolf Bultmann's student accommodation.
10
Former literary bookstore Quichotte (today located in "Bei der Fruchtschranne 10").
11
Cäsar Hirsch's student accommodation.
12
Birthplace of Albert Knapp.
14
Greek restaurant and pension Traube.
19
Before the war events of 1634 and 1635, astronomer Wilhelm Schickard worked here. It is thought that his wife and some of his children died during the black death. After supposedly fleeing the plague, he returned to Tübingen for fear of looting. He later succumbed to the epidemic and died.
24
Birthplace of poet Ludwig Uhland. In 1830, the Hirschauer Tor was demolished. It was located between Neckar and Hohentübingen Castle. It was one of the five city gates in the old city wall of Tübingen and opened the way to Hirschau and Rottenburg. From the gate the single-storey remains of the round tower, a former prison, called Diebsturm, still exists.
26a
Old town outpatient clinic of the Tübingen Academy for Behavioral Therapy gGmbH (TAVT), in which statutory health insurance companies can serve billable psychotherapeutic treatments.
27
Stiftskirchengemeinde, a common east-middle-west parish office. The Jewish professor Leopold Pfeiffer (born 25 October 1821 in Weikersheim, died 4 November 1881 in Tübingen) lived here at Hirschauer Tor. He specialized in civil litigation and criminal proceedings in connection with criminal law and from 1851 to 1881 was an associate professor at the University of Tübingen. He died in the Jewish sector. His body was buried at Pragfriedhof, Stuttgart.
30b
Former mint that coined the Tübingen Pfennig, moved from its former location at Münzgasse 6. In the 19th century Tübingen district court.
31
Theodor Haering House, museum villa and municipal collections. In January 1989, a fire broke out in the house and the collection was moved to a new museum in a former Kornhaus at Kornhausstraße 10. The House continues to be used by the museum as a depot. As a child, Peter Weiss lived in this house and the museum garden.
32
Former Tübingen unemployed organisation and asylum center. The pupils' club Schüli was located in one of the three houses of the Protestant Church in this street. A group of developers acquired the 1832-built, listed building to renovate it and then rent it as living space. Today the non-profit club Tübingen Vanishing Points is there, which supports refugees in their efforts to obtain a right to stay in Germany.
36
Catholic Children's House Sankt Johannes.
37
The "Neckarblick" house, a listed residential building built in 1892 by architect Franz Bärtle.
38
The home of Julie Bonhoeffer, mother of Karl Bonhoeffer and grandmother of Dietrich Bonhoeffer.

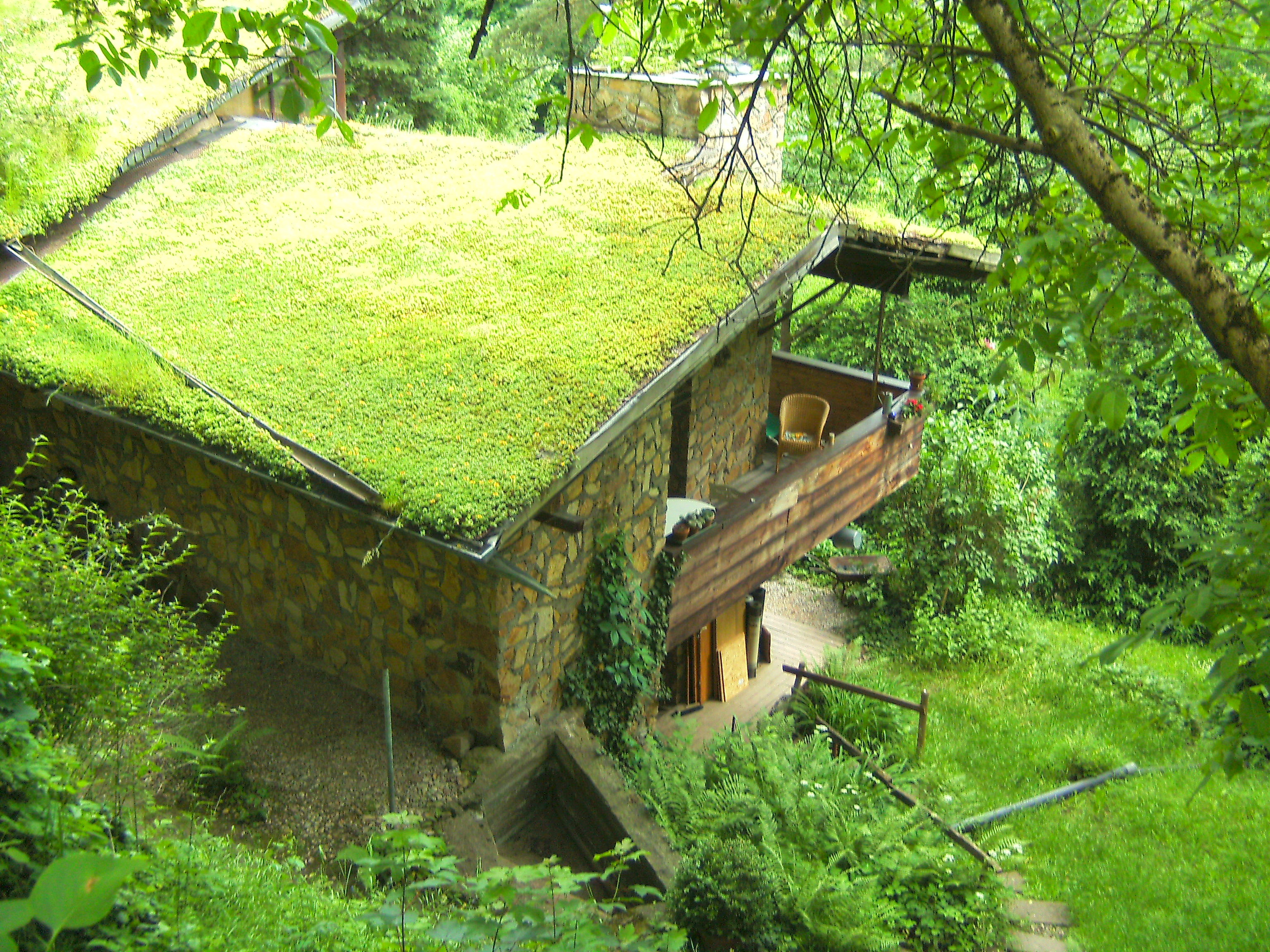
43 - Haus Herb

40
"Altes Pfälzerhaus" (Old Palatinate House), former restaurant "Zur Pfalz", and location of founding student fraternity "Palatia", today the Asylum Center Tübingen, Tübingen Unemployed Club (TAT) and the ecumenical pupils' club Schüli.
41
Glassed Apartments, built in 1968, were the home of literary scholar Hans Mayer, designed by architect Heinrich Johann Niemeyer.
43
The Herb House, built in 1959, was inspired by nature and designed by architect Heinrich Johann Niemeyer.
46
A residential building built by Karl Haug in 1867 and modified in 1876 according to plans by Conradin Walther (1846–1910) from Nuremberg.
47
Built in 1904 as the villa of Professor Hermann Vierordt, it was bought by the Old Strasbourg fraternity Germania in 1952.

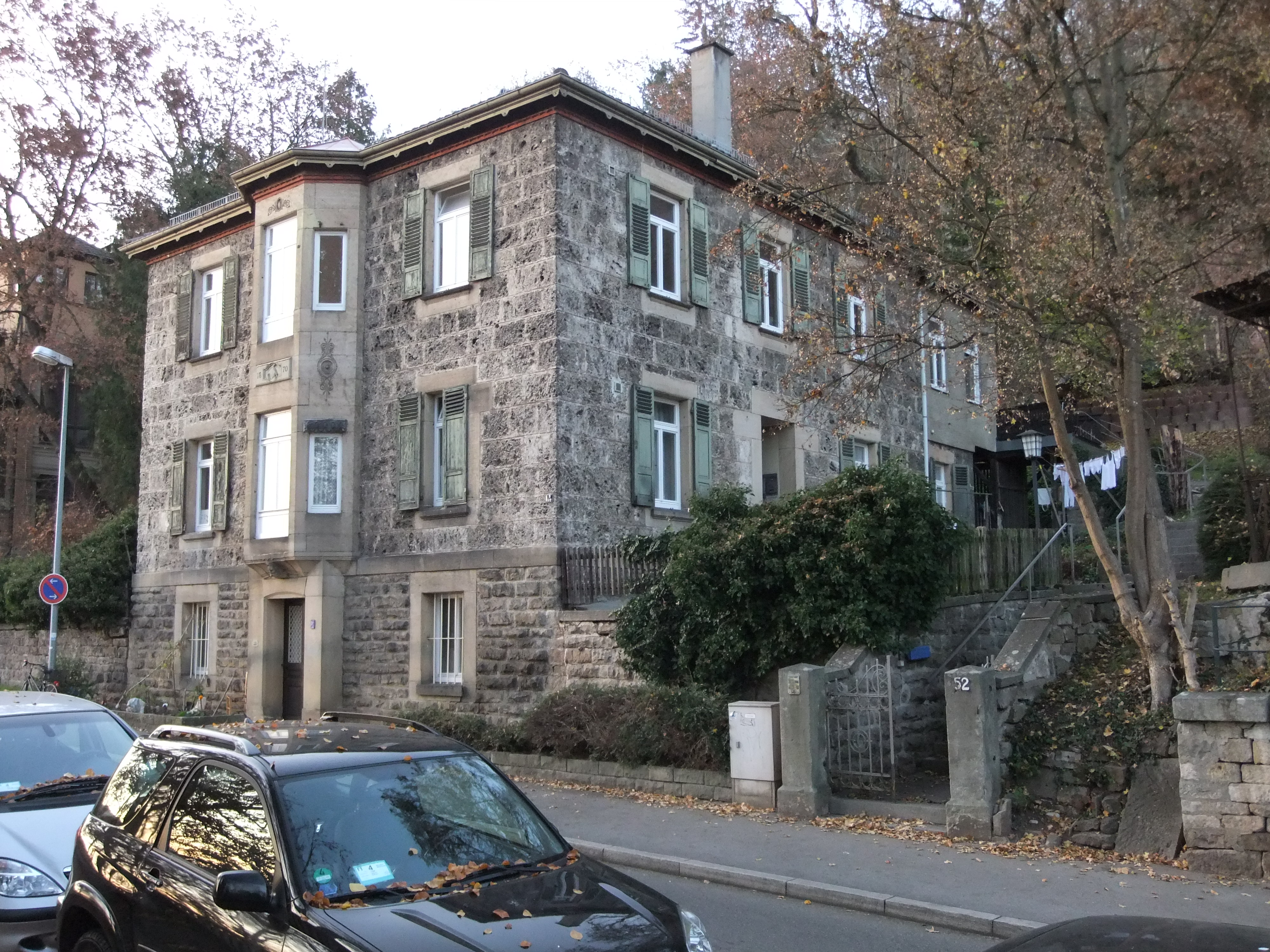
52 - Mathilde-Weber-Haus

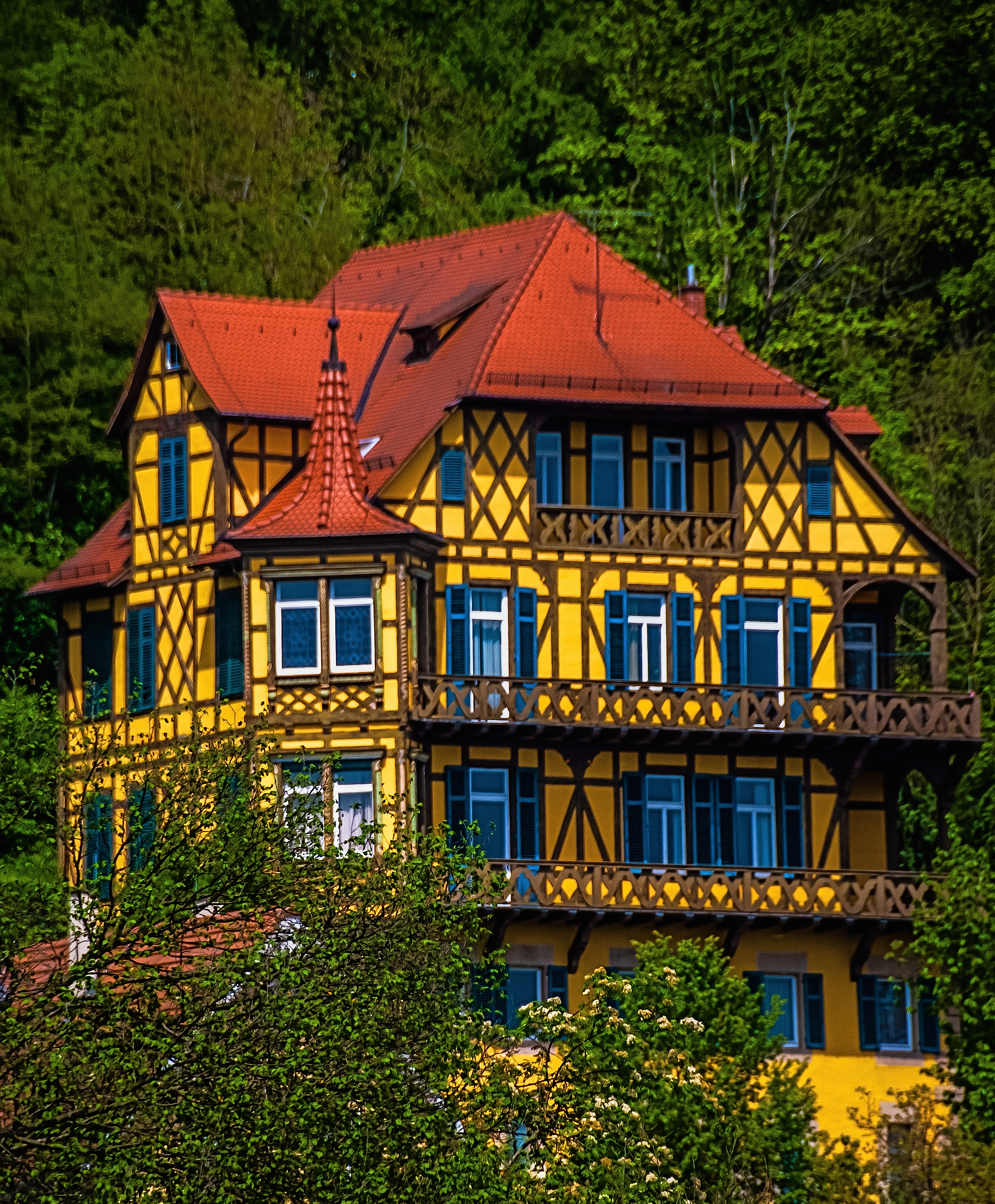
64 - Villa Hügel (Karmel)

50
Built in 1866 by Professor Karl Haug, modified later.
52
Mathilde Weber House, built in 1870.
55
Until the 2010s, the Deutsche Gesellschaft für Verhaltenstherapie was located here.
56
Villa Lust by district judge Ludwig Lust; in 1888 he transformed the fallow vineyards behind the villa into a small park called Ludwigslust, "equipped with grotto, fountain basin and a luxurious cast-iron winter garden, which he had bought specially from an old Stuttgart villa"; it was the home of Konrad Knopp.
64
Edith-Stein-Karmel; 1899-built as Villa Hügel, five-stack timbered house on the hill with a bay window in the Renaissance Revival style, inhabited by one of the Baron von Hügel family with his wife, born with the name Von Soden; local historian Eugen Nägele in his Tübinger Blätter praised "the unmistakable pure old German style" of the villa in contrast to other mixed-style buildings in "Tübingen Nice", planning by Conradin Walther. The "Villa Hügel" was transformed in 1978 into a Carmelite monastery for Cologne nuns including the famous nun Waltraud Herbstrith.
70
Café KaffeeKränzle.

== Junctions ==
The Neckarhalde branches at its upper, northeastern end, the so-called Faules Eck (Lazy or bad corner), into the Burgsteige, Wienergässle, Kronenstraße, Münzgasse and Klosterberg. The origin of this colloquial name is uncertain. It may come from the smell of damp wood due to the Neckar timber rafting that was transported up the Neckarhalde and for a time was temporarily stored or by the fact that there the woodworking timber traders there scolded the alleged lazy students who watched them and sometimes mocked them. Today, however, it is considered to be most likely that long ago the narrowness, especially for larger transports from the marketplace to the castle, made it less walkable and passable, so in this sense it was a "Bad corner".

At the lower, southwestern end, the Neckarhalde splits into the Biesinger and Hirschauer roads.

In the lower third branch off the avenue bridge, there is a pedestrian tunnel and footpath.

== Tunnel ==
The Neckarhalde is next to the three tunnels through Schlossberg (Castle Hill).

=== Tunnel of the Ammer Valley Railway ===
The tunnel of the Ammertalbahn (Ammer Valley Railway) is a single-track railway tunnel through the Schlossberg, which passes under the Neckarhalde. It is 288 m (945 ft) long and was opened on 1 May 1910. Like the entire Ammertalbahn line, the tunnel is not electrified, but it should be electrified by 2022.

=== Pedestrian tunnel ===
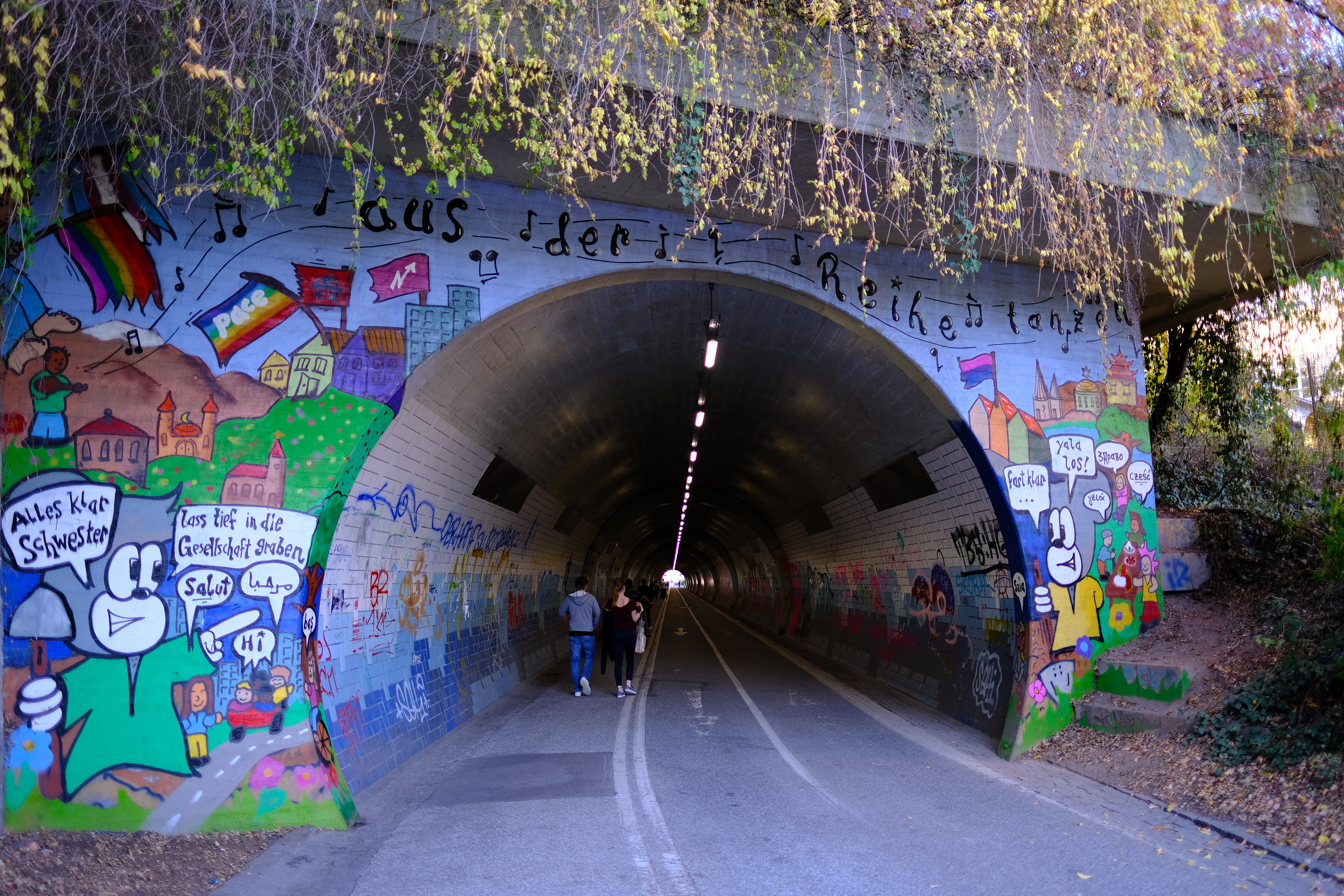
South entry of the pedestrian tunnel at the apex of Neckarhalde

The pedestrian tunnel ends in the lower third of Neckarhalde. Since the mid-1970s it bypasses Alleenbrücke to the Haagtorplatz in the Schlossberg. Until the completion of Bundesstraße 28 in 1979, the tunnel was used for five years as single-lane motor vehicle traffic. Today it is for pedestrians, cyclists and the fire brigade only. Since 2007 mopeds and scooters are prohibited from using the tunnel.

=== B 296 tunnel ===
The B 296 tunnel (until the end of 2017 named as B 28) passes under Neckarhalde. It is usually called the Schlossbergtunnel. It is a three-tube, 290-m long tunnel. Two outer two-lane tubes each serve the main road, and a smaller middle tube is dedicated for service and rescue.
