= Theodor Haering =

German philosopher (1884–1964)

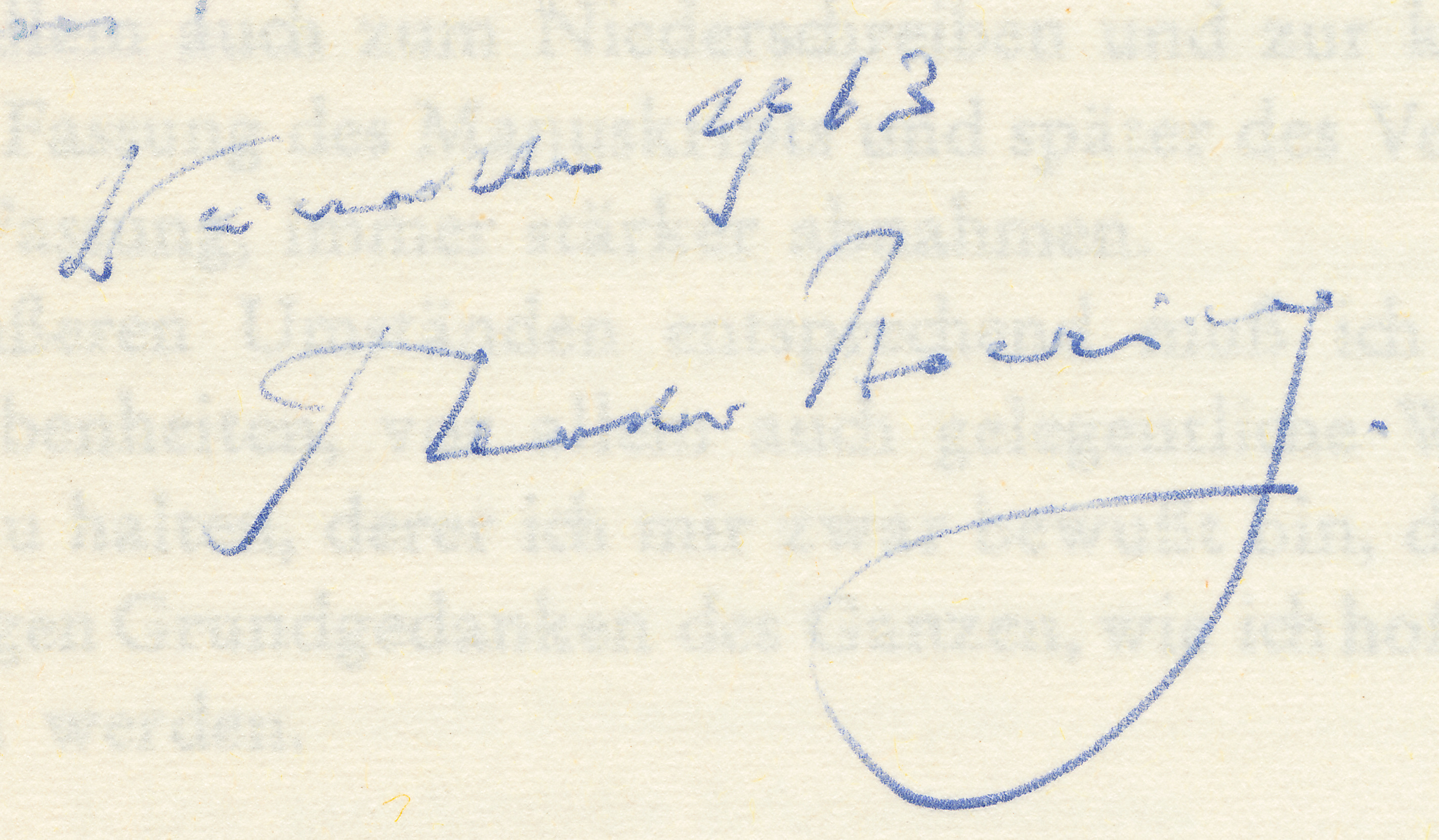
Signature of Theodor Haering, part of a dedication in a copy of his last book, dated Christmas 1963

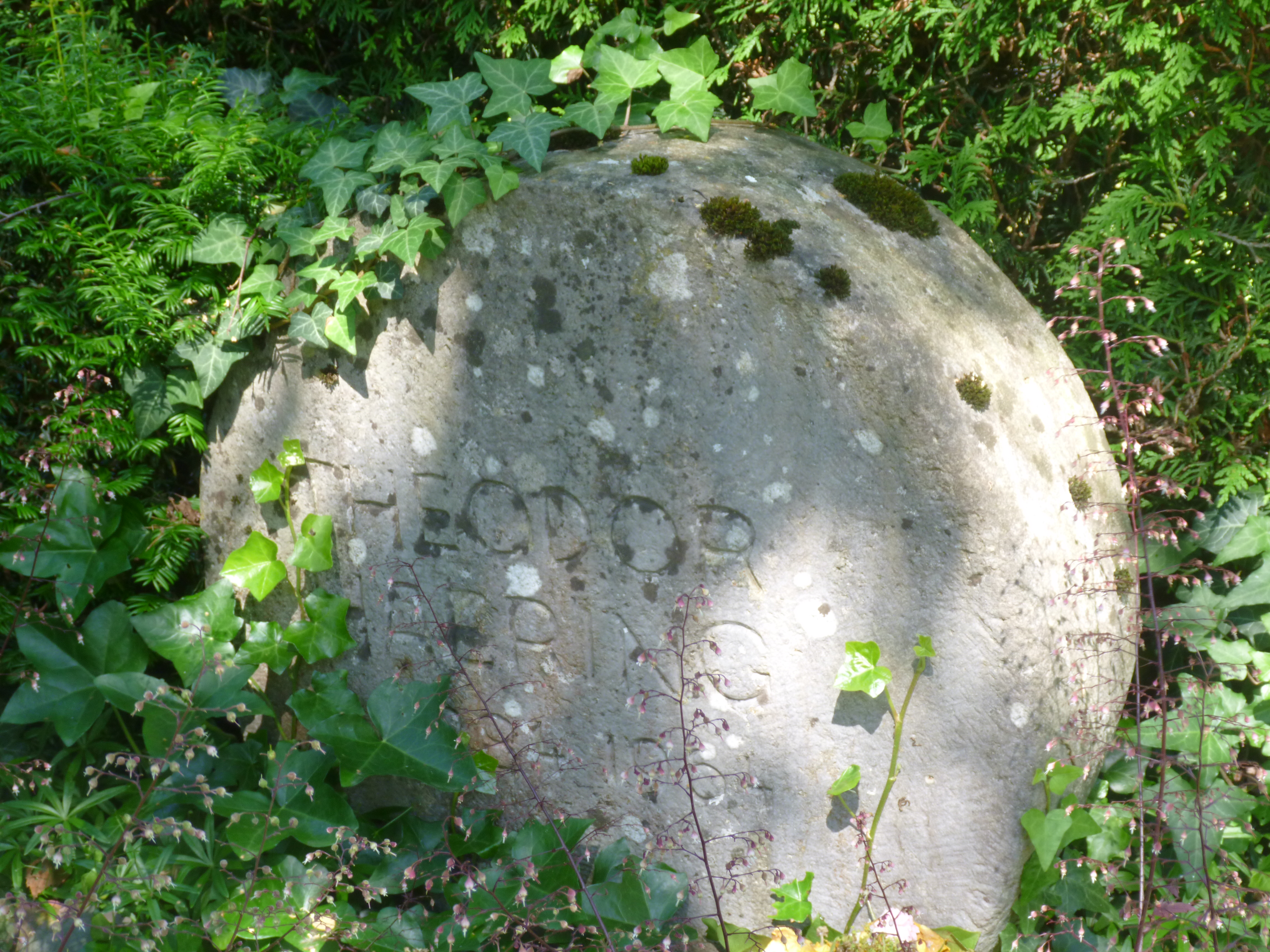
Grave in the city cemetery of Tübingen

Theodor Lorenz Haering (22 April 1884 in Stuttgart; 15 June 1964 in Tübingen) was a German philosopher, writer and philosophy professor in the University of Tübingen.

== Life ==
Theodor Haering was the son of the Protestant theologian and university professor Theodor von Haering and brother of the historian Hermann Haering. He initially studied Protestant theology at the University of Tübingen and passed his first theological examination in 1906. He belonged to the Tübingen Protestant Foundation and was a member of the Luginsland Tübingen student fraternity. After a short vicariate, he took a leave of absence in 1907/08 to study philosophy in Berlin. Following the 1910 doctoral dissertation at the University of Tübingen under Erich Adickes (on the Kant's Duisburg Nachlass), after further studies in Bonn (1911/12), where he was impressed by the experimental psychologist Oswald Külpe, he completed his habilitation in Tübingen, again under Erich Adickes (1912) on Die Psychologie der Wertung.

From 1919, Haering became a university lecturer in Tübingen, initially as an associate professor of philosophy. After Adicke's death in 1928, he was appointed to his chair of historical and systematic philosophy.

During the National Socialist era, Theodor Haering was a leading member of the NS-Dozentenbund; he applied for admission to the NSDAP on 23 October 1937, and was retroactively admitted on 1 May of the same year (membership number 5.896.006). He had already sympathized with the party beforehand. He understood Philosophie als geistige Rassenkunde (philosophy as an spiritual racial science, the title of a lecture from 1939) and wrote as early as 1935: "Next to the racial principle is the Führer principle. During the Second World War, he was involved in the Nazi war effort in the Geisteswissenschaften (humanities). Due to his involvement with the Nazis, the University Appeals Chamber categorized him as a "follower" in 1948 and he lost his civil rights and his professorship for three years. Bcoming emeritus in 1951 coincided with his rehabilitation and reinstatement under the 131 Act. Even after the war, he maintained his anti-democratic convictions. In addition to philosophical works, he also wrote local history and literary works. He was chairman of the Tübingen Museum Society for many years and was a member of the Tübingen municipal council for the Free Voters' Association from 1953. When he retired in November 1957, he became an honorary citizen of Tübingen. In return, he bequeathed his villa (Neckarhalde 31) to the city of Tübingen, which is now called the Theodor-Haering-Haus and houses part of the city's collections as well as rooms for artistic and museum education programs. In 1959, he was awarded the Grand Cross of the Order of Merit of the Federal Republic of Germany. On 17 June 2013, Tübingen's honorary citizenship was revoked by a resolution of the city council.

His nachlass and private library can be found in the University Library of Tübingen.

== Work ==
- Über den Duisburg'schen Kantnachlaß und Kants Kritizismus um 1775, Dissertation, Universität Tübingen 1910.
- Die Materialisierung des Geistes. Mohr, Tübingen 1919.
- Untersuchungen zur Psychologie der Wertung (auf experimenteller Grundlage) mit besonderer Berücksichtigung der methodologischen Fragen. W. Engelmann, Leipzig 1920 (Habilitationsschrift Universität Tübinger 1912).
- Die Struktur der Weltgeschichte. Mohr, Tübingen 1921.
- Philosophie der Naturwissenschaft. Rösl & Co., München 1923.
- Hegel. Sein Wollen und sein Werk. Eine chronologische Entwicklungsgeschichte der Gedanken und der Sprache Hegels. 2 Bände, Leipzig u. Berlin, 1929–1938.
- Rede auf Alt-Tübingen. 1934.
- „Der Mond braust durch das Neckartal ...". Ein romantischer Spaziergang durch das nächtliche Tübingen nebst allerlei nützlichen und kurzweiligen Betrachtungen über Gott und Welt/ Raum und Zeit/ Natur und Geist/ und insonderheit über die Menschen untereinander. Wunderlich, Tübingen 1935 [viele Neuauflagen, darunter 1949 mit geringfügigen Veränderungen].
  - Überarbeitete Neuausgabe: Stephan Kaiser (Hrsg.), Wunderlich, Tübingen 1977; Deutsche Verlags-Anstalt, Stuttgart 1985 und 1988.
- Rede für den Geist. Kohlhammer, Stuttgart 1935.
- Cusanus – Paracelsus – Böhme. Ein Beitrag zur geistigen Ahnenforschung unserer Tage. In: Zeitschrift für deutsche Kulturphilosophie, 2, 1935/36, S. 1ff.
- Was ist deutsche Philosophie? Kohlhammer, Stuttgart 1936.
- Hegels Lehre von Staat und Recht. Kohlhammer, Stuttgart 1940.
- Das Lächeln des Herrn Liebeneiner. Heilbronn 1940.
- Albert der Deutsche. Kohlhammer, Stuttgart 1941.
- Fichte, Schelling, Hegel. Kohlhammer, Stuttgart 1941.
- Verheißung und Verhängnis der deutschen Art. Kohlhammer, Stuttgart 1941. (Vortrag, 5. Nov. 1940)
- als Herausgeber: Das Deutsche in der deutschen Philosophie. Stuttgart 1941.
- Die deutsche und die europäische Philosophie. Kohlhammer, Stuttgart 1943
- Der Tod und das Mädchen. Reclam, Leipzig 1943.
- Schwaben Spiegel. Oertel & Spörer, Reutlingen 1949.
- Was ist Leben?. In: Zeitschrift für philosophische Forschung, 1950.
- Zu Gehlens Anthropologie. In: Zeitschrift für philosophische Forschung, 1952.
- Haeringssalat, Reutlingen 1953.
- Novalis als Philosoph, Kohlhammer, Stuttgart 1954.
- Philosophie des Verstehens. Versuch einer systematisch-erkenntnistheoretischen Grundlegung alles Erkennens. Niemeyer, Tübingen 1963

== Literature ==
- Walther Gerhardt (1966). "Haering, Theodor Lorenz". Neue Deutsche Biographie (in German). Vol. 7. Berlin: Duncker & Humblot. pp. 449–450. (full text online).
- Hubert Kiesewetter: Von Hegel zu Hitler. Hoffmann und Campe, Hamburg 1974.
- Benigna Schönhagen: Tübingen unterm Hakenkreuz. 1991, ISBN 3-8062-0838-7
- Manfred Hantke: Der Philosoph als „Mitläufer". Theodor Haering: „Es kam ein Führer! Der Führer kam!". In: Benigna Schönhagen (Hrsg.): Nationalsozialismus in Tübingen. Vorbei und vergessen. Katalog der Ausstellung. 1992, ISBN 3-910090-02-8, S. 179–185
- Ernst Klee: Das Personenlexikon zum Dritten Reich. 2003
- R. Weible: Tübinger Linke Liste beantragt Umbenennung des Haering-Hauses. In: Schwäbisches Tagblatt. 9 February 2005 (auch online)
- Manfred Hantke: Über die „reachte ond wirkliche Volksgemoi'schaft". Die Geschichte der „Rede auf Alt-Tübingen" aus dem Jahre 1934 von Professor Theodor Haering. In: Tübinger Blätter. Jahrgang 93, 2006/2007, S. 45–51
- Hermann Bausinger: "... a reachte Volksgemoi̕ schaft". Wie sich der Tübinger Philosoph Theodor Haering mit dem Volk gemein macht. In: Bernd Jürgen Warneken (Hrsg.): Volksfreunde. Historische Varianten sozialen Engagements, Kulturamt, Tübingen 2007 (Tübinger Kataloge, Band 103), S. 93–105, ISBN 978-3-932512-38-4.
- Patricia Gebhart: Der Fall Theodor Haering. Geschichte eines Tübinger Ehrenbürgers. Vom Umgang mit der NS-Vergangenheit in Tübingen, Tübingen 2008.
- Patricia Gebhart: Ein Bürger aller Ehren wert? Der Fall Theodor Haering, In: Hans-Otto Binder u. a. (Hg.), Vom braunen Hemd zur weißen Weste? Vom Umgang der Vergangenheit in Tübingen nach 1945 (Kleine Tübinger Schriften 28), Tübingen 2011, 102–128.
