= Heinrich Johann Niemeyer =

German architect

- Born: 1936
- Died: 2010 (aged 73–74); Tübingen, Germany
- Occupation: Architect

Heinrich Johann Niemeyer was a German independent architect.

Niemeyer's style was partly based on other futuristic architecture like that of Frank Lloyd Wright, Antoni Gaudi and John Lautner and combined space for work and living under same roof.

Born 1936 and died 2010 in Tübingen each, by 1977 for his family he had built a house in Rottenburg-Dettingen. He was a member of Unitas Markomannia fraternity. Brazilian architect Oscar Niemeyer was a far relative of him. Niemeyer worked until his death in the surrounded by nature, a small, romantic-haunted "house in the Charlottenstraße 22 of Tübingen, which was not built by him, but was older and demolished in 2016.

== Work (selection) ==
- 1959/60: Neckarhalde 43, Tübingen: House Herb with natural architecture and Green roof (while studying)
- 1968: Neckarhalde 41, Tübingen: glazed apartment house in which the literary scholar Hans Mayer lived.
- Stilt houses of Pulheim–Sinnersdorf
- crystal Houses of Bregenz hexagonal buildings similar to the Futuro by Matti Suuronen or the Chemosphäre by John Lautner.
- 1970: Crystal House Nagold–Emmingen
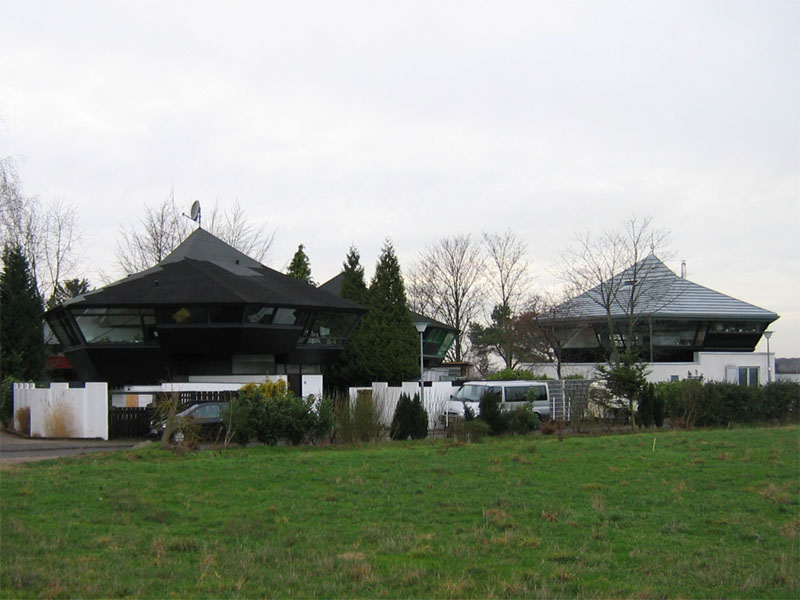
Stilt houses of Sinnersdorf

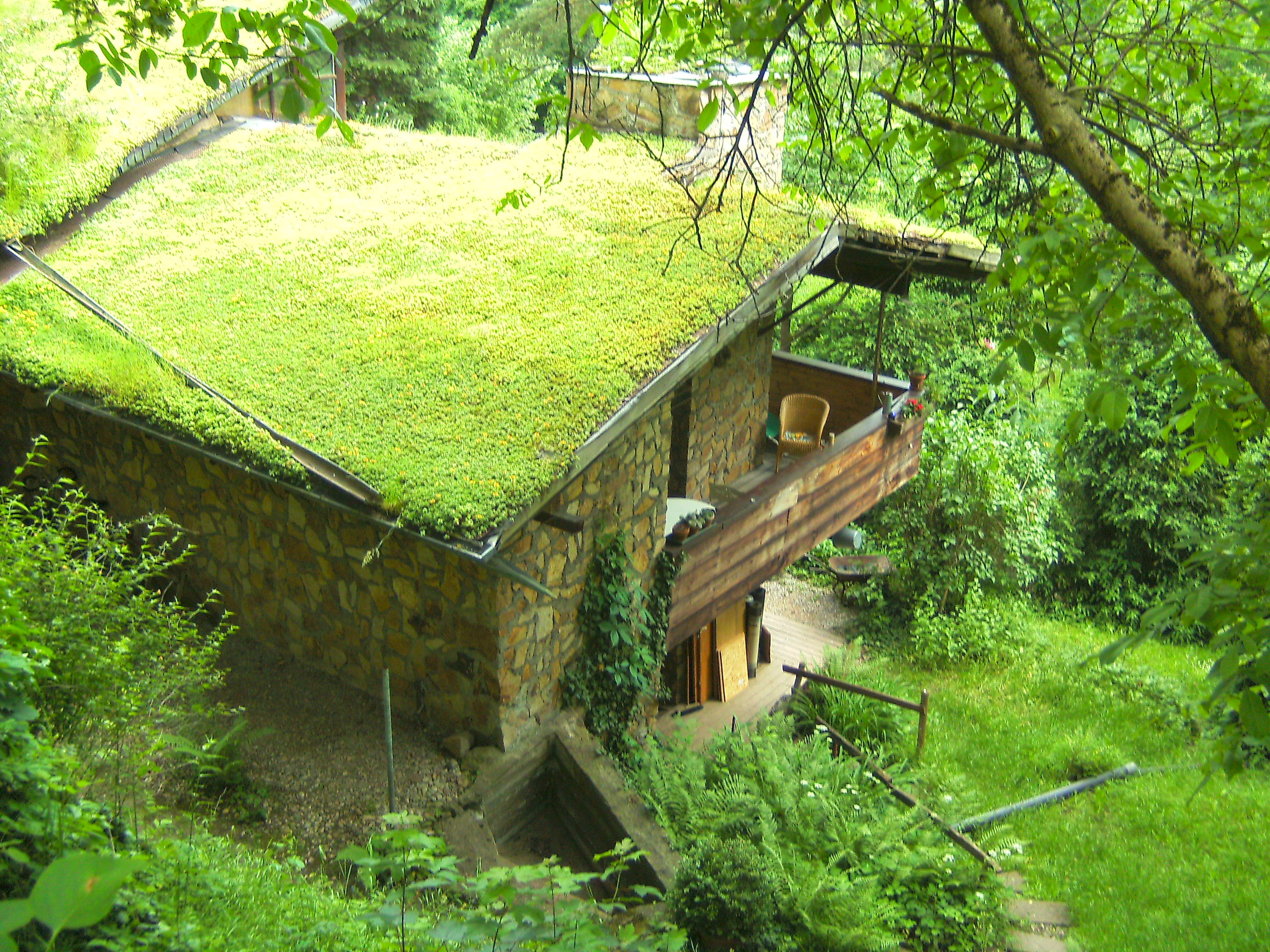
The Herb House in Tübingen
